= List of people associated with Somerville College, Oxford =

The following is a list of notable people associated with Somerville College, Oxford, including alumni and fellows of the college. This list consists almost entirely of women, due to the fact that Somerville College was one of the first two women's colleges of the University of Oxford, admitting men for the first time in 1994. The college and its alumni have played a very important role in feminism.

Somervillians include prime ministers Margaret Thatcher and Indira Gandhi, Nobel-Prize-winning scientist Dorothy Hodgkin, television personalities Esther Rantzen and Susie Dent, reformer Cornelia Sorabji, writers Marjorie Boulton, Vera Brittain, A. S. Byatt, Susan Cooper, Penelope Fitzgerald, Alan Hollinghurst, Winifred Holtby, Nicole Krauss, Iris Murdoch and Dorothy L. Sayers, politicians Lucy Powell, Shirley Williams, Thérèse Coffey, Margaret Jay and Sam Gyimah, socialite Lady Ottoline Morrell, Princess Bamba Sutherland and her sister, philosophers G. E. M. Anscombe, Patricia Churchland, Philippa Foot and Mary Midgley, psychologist Anne Treisman, archaeologist Kathleen Kenyon, actress Moon Moon Sen, soprano Emma Kirkby and numerous women's rights activists, as well as 30 dames, 18 heads of Oxbridge colleges, 15 life peers, 12 MP's, 4 Olympic rowers, 3 of The 50 greatest British writers since 1945, 2 prime ministers, 2 princesses, a queen consort, a first lady, and a Nobel laureate (plus three nominees).

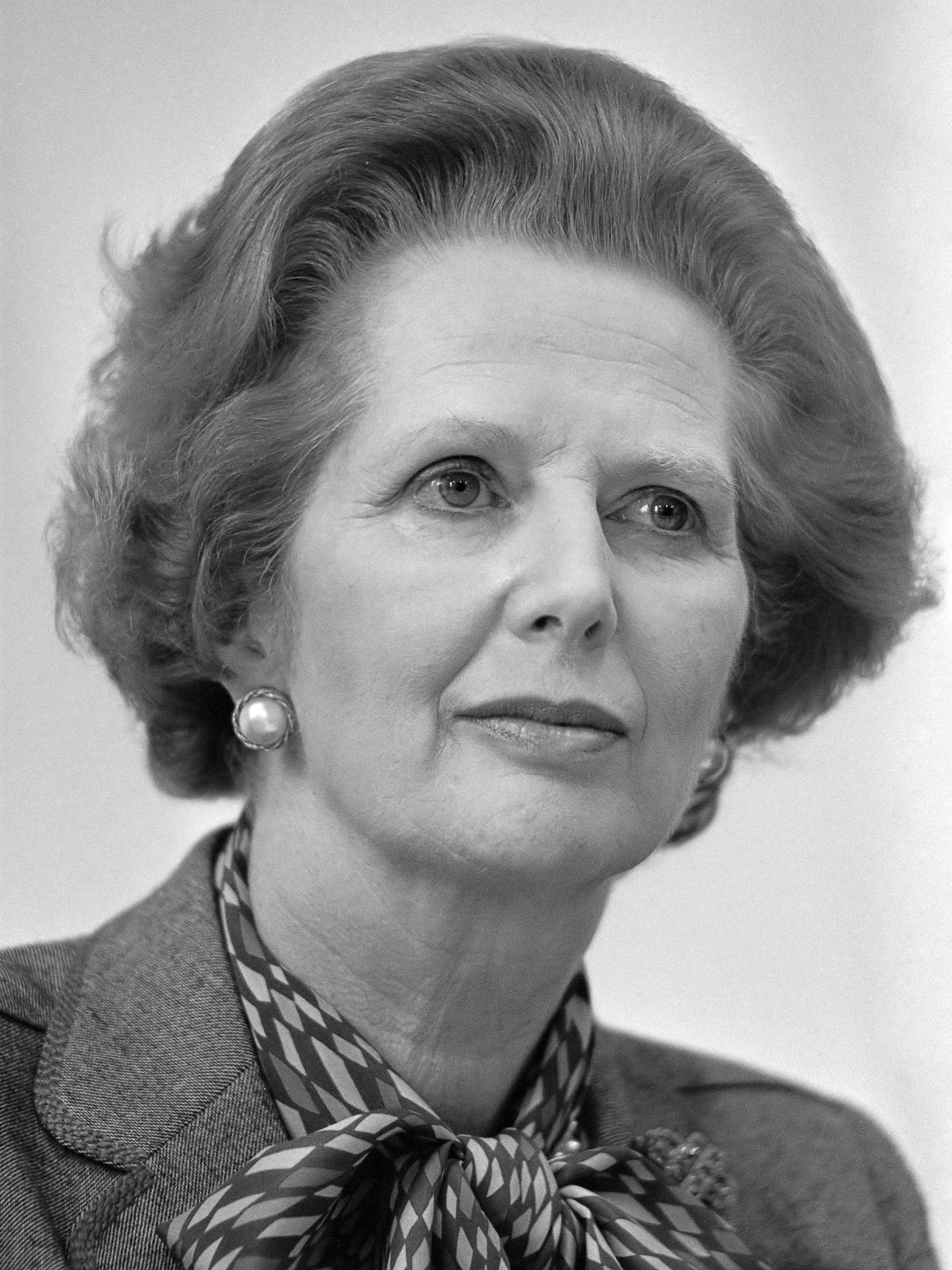
Margaret Thatcher, first woman Prime Minister of the United Kingdom (1979–1990)

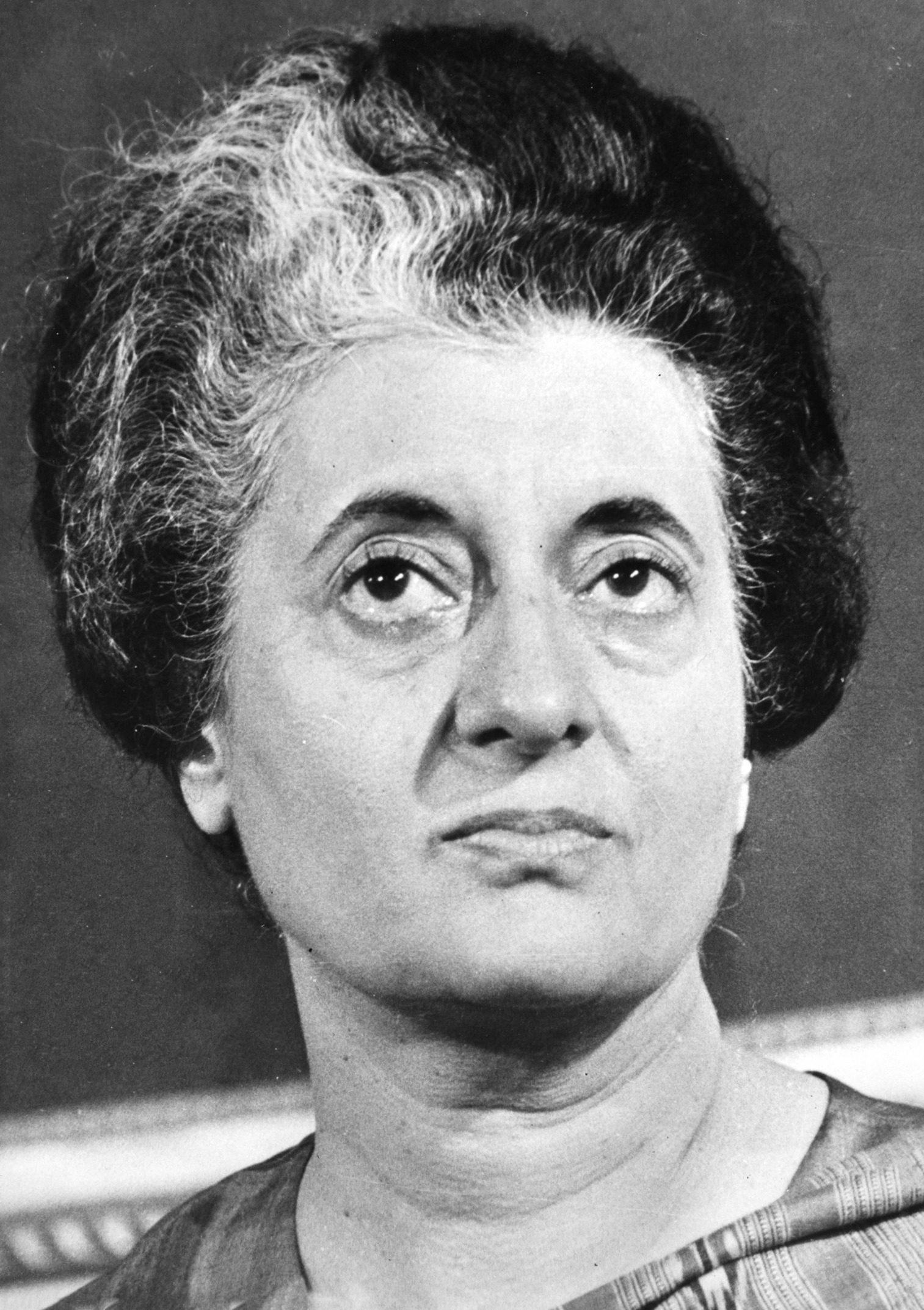
Indira Gandhi, first and only woman Prime Minister of India (1966–1977, 1980–1984) and "Woman of the Millennium"

Dorothy Hodgkin, the first and only British woman scientist to have been awarded a Nobel Prize

== Firsts ==
Somervillians have achieved a good number of "firsts", internationally, nationally and at Oxford University. The most distinguished are the first woman Prime Minister of the United Kingdom Margaret Thatcher, the first and only British woman to win a Nobel Prize in science Dorothy Hodgkin, and the first woman to lead the world's largest democracy Indira Gandhi, Prime Minister of India for much of the 1970s. Others include Cornelia Sorabji, first female lawyer in India and first Indian national to study at any British university; Anne Warburton, first female British ambassador; Constance Coltman, Britain's first woman to be an ordained Anglican minister; Shriti Vadera, Baroness Vadera, first woman to head a major British bank and chair the Royal Shakespeare Company; Thérèse Coffey, first female Deputy Prime Minister of the UK, Evelyn Sharp, Baroness Sharp, first female permanent secretary, and Carys Bannister, first female neurosurgeon in the UK.

Other firsts include:
- Manel Abeysekera, Sri Lanka's first woman diplomat
- Margery Abrahams, first chairperson of the British Dietetic Association
- Ruth Adler, Scotland's first Amnesty International employee
- Caroline Alexander, first woman to publish a full-length English translation of Homer's Iliad
- Rachel Armitage, first New Zealand woman BA to complete a degree at Oxford
- Bolanle Awe, first female academic staff in a Nigerian university and first chairperson of the National Commission for Women (Nigeria)
- Margaret Ballinger, first President of the Liberal Party of South Africa
- Jean Banister, first female Departmental Demonstrator in Physiology at Oxford
- Carys Bannister, first female neurosurgeon in the United Kingdom
- Farah Bhatti, first British woman of Pakistani origins to be made a cardiac surgeon in the United Kingdom; first Muslim on the council of the Royal College of Surgeons of England Women in Surgery Forum
- Kalpana Bista, first female Minister of Education, Science and Technology of Nepal
- Winifred Blackman one of the first women to take up anthropology as a profession
- Susanne Bobzien, first woman to be appointed a tutorial fellow at The Queen's College, Oxford
- Lalage Bown, first organizing secretary of the International Congress of Africanists, first woman to receive the William Pearson Tolley Award from Syracuse University
- Victoria Braithwaite, first person to demonstrate that fish feel pain
- Averil Cameron, first female Warden of Keble College
- Hilda Cashmore, first warden of Barton Hill Settlement in Bristol
- Gwendolen M. Carter, first female president of the African Studies Association
- Margaret Casely-Hayford, first female Chancellor of Coventry University, first black woman to be Partner in a City law firm
- Ethel Charles, first woman to be admitted to the Royal Institute of British Architects and, with her sister Bessie, the first woman to study architecture at University College London
- Catherine Childs, first woman lecturer at the University of Reading; one of the first two women to become members of Oxford' Honours School of Zoology
- Maude Clarke, first female to join Queen's University Belfast’s academic staff
- Thérèse Coffey, also first female MP for Suffolk Coastal
- Susan Cooper, first woman to edit the Oxford undergraduate newspaper Cherwell
- Maria Czaplicka, first woman to receive a Mianowski Scholarship, first Polish woman to receive financial support for higher education abroad, and first female lecturer in anthropology at Oxford
- Ann Dally, first woman to study medicine at St Thomas' Hospital
- Helen Darbishire, first woman to be chair of the faculty board of English at Oxford
- Elsbeth Dimsdale, first woman to receive a college fellowship at the University of Cambridge
- Barbara Freire-Marreco, one of the first two women to gain a Diploma in Anthropology at Oxford
- Geraldine Penrose Fitzgerald, arguably the first Catholic Oxford woman student
- Kathleen Fitzpatrick, first associate professor in Australia outside the natural sciences
- Fiona Freckleton, won Great Britain's first medal in a major World Championship women's rowing event
- Maggie Gee, first female Chair of the Royal Society of Literature (RSL)
- Jean Ginsburg, first woman to graduate from St Mary's Hospital Medical School
- Rose Graham, first female President of the British Archaeological Association
- Joyce Gutteridge, UK's first female legal adviser at the Foreign Office
- Gertrud Herzog-Hauser, first Austrian woman to gain a habilitation at university and Vienna’s first university lecturer in classical languages
- Agnes Headlam-Morley, first woman to be appointed to a chair (full professorship) at Oxford
- Sheila Hill, first woman to be elected to the general council of the Association of Cricket Umpires and Scorers and one of the first ten women granted honorary MCC membership
- Carole Hillenbrand, first non-Muslim to be awarded the King Faisal International Prize for Islamic Studies
- Margaret Hills, first female councillor on Stroud District Council
- Dorothy Hodgkin, also the first woman to receive maternity pay at Oxford and first female Chancellor of the University of Bristol
- Rosalind Hursthouse, first woman to teach at an all men's college in Oxford
- Evelyn Irons, first female war correspondent to be decorated with the French Croix de Guerre, first journalist to reach certain WWII war zones and first female Stanhope Medal recipient
- Peggy Jackson, first female Archdeacon of Llandaff
- Carole Jordan, first woman President of the Royal Astronomical Society and one of the first female professors of astronomy in the UK
- Diana Josephson, first woman to lead the National Oceanic and Atmospheric Administration (NOAA) and first female Under Secretary of Commerce for Oceans and Atmosphere
- Mary Keegan, first female audit partner at PwC
- Kathleen Kenyon, first female president of the Oxford University Archaeological Society
- Doris Ketelbey, first woman historian to hold a long-term position at the University of St Andrews
- Laeticia Kikonyogo, first Ugandan woman to be appointed High Court judge and Chief Magistrate
- Alix Kilroy, one of the first two women to have entered the administrative grade of the Civil Service by examination
- Akua Kuenyehia, first First Vice-president of the ICC and Ghana's first female law professor
- Christine Lee, first female scholar of the Oxford University Medical School
- Nemone Lethbridge, first female at Hare Court and one of Britain's first female barristers
- Leah L'Estrange Malone, first female chair of the Jewish Labour Movement
- Genevieve Lloyd, first female professor of philosophy in Australia
- Hilda Lorimer, one of the first three women to participate in an excavation conducted by the British School at Athens
- Leah Lowenstein, first woman dean of a co-education medical school in the United States
- Margaret Mackworth, 2nd Viscountess Rhondda, first female director of the Institute of Directors
- Dorothea Maude, first woman general practitioner in Oxford
- Monica Milne, first woman to be appointed to the permanent staff of the Foreign Office
- Elizabeth Monk, one of the first two women admitted to the Quebec Bar, first Quebec woman to receive a Queen's Counsel designation, and first woman to receive the Elizabeth Torrance Medal at McGill University
- Michele Moody-Adams, first woman and the first African-American dean at Columbia University
- Edith Morley, first female professor in Britain
- Anne Mueller, first female Permanent secretary at HM Treasury
- Isobel Henderson, first married female Fellow at Oxford
- Hilda D. Oakeley, first Warden of the new Royal Victoria College and first woman to deliver McGill's annual university lecture
- Onora O'Neill, Baroness O'Neill of Bengarve, first female winner of the Berggruen Prize
- Daphne Park, Baroness Park of Monmouth, the highest ranking female officer of her time in the British intelligence services (the Queen of Spies)
- Inez Pearn, first woman to be awarded the de Osma studentship (for research in Spain) at Oxford
- Emily Penrose, first woman to gain a First in Greats (Classics) at Oxford
- Adelaide Plumptre, first woman elected chair of the Canadian Red Cross, TBE and first woman to sit in the Toronto Board of Control
- Mildred Pope, first woman to hold a readership at Oxford
- Lucy Powell, Manchester's first female Labour member of parliament
- Evelyn Procter, first female scholar to be admitted to the National Historical Archive of Spain and the Biblioteca Nacional de España
- Esther Rantzen, first woman to receive a Dimbleby Award from BAFTA
- Eleanor Rathbone, first Oxford woman to be elected to parliament
- Elizabeth Anne Reid, world's first advisor on women's affairs to a head of government
- Joyce Reynolds, first woman awarded the Kenyon Medal
- Jean Robinson, first blind British woman to graduate from university
- Katherine Routledge, initiated the first true survey of Easter Island
- Diana Rowntree, first architectural writer for The Guardian
- Susan M. Scott, first female physicist to win the Prime Minister's Prizes for Science
- Margaret Seward, first Oxford female student to be entered for the honour school of Mathematics, one of the first two women students at Oxford studying chemistry, earliest Chemist on staff at the Royal Holloway (of which she was a founding Lecturer) and first woman to obtain a first class in the honour school of Natural Science
- Chehrzad Shakiban, first Iranian woman to receive a Ph.D. in mathematics, first Iranian woman to become a full professor of mathematics, and first female full professor at the University of St. Thomas (Minnesota)
- Lucy Sichone, first Zambian woman to receive a Rhodes Scholarship and first woman to have her portrait displayed on the walls of the prestigious Rhodes House
- Angela Sinclair-Loutit, first female member of the Friends' Ambulance Unit
- Premala Sivaprakasapillai Sivasegaram, first female engineer in Sri Lanka
- Mary Somerville, first woman controller of a BBC division; first director of BBC School Radio
- May Staveley, first warden of Clifton Hill House, Bristol's women's university settlement
- Theresa Stewart, first female leader of Birmingham City Council
- Lucy Sutherland, first woman undergraduate to speak at the Oxford Union and first female Pro-vice-chancellor of Oxford
- Ann Gaynor Taylor, first female Fellow of St Edmund Hall, Oxford
- Margerie Venables Taylor, first female vice-president of the Society of Antiquaries of London
- Claire Tomlinson, highest-rated female polo player, first woman to win the County Cup and the Queen's Cup, first woman in the world to rise to five goals, first female player in The Varsity Polo Match and first female captain of the OUPC
- Lady Juliet Townsend, first female Lord Lieutenant of Northamptonshire
- Anne Treisman, first woman to win the Golden Brain Award
- Pamela Vandyke-Price, first British woman to write about wine and spirits
- Emily Wallace, first president of the Oxford University Student Union to be officially recognised by the University
- Marcia Wilkinson, first recipient of the Elizabeth Garrett Anderson Award for her extraordinary contribution to relieving the burden of those affected by headache
- Jean Wilks, first female Pro-Chancellor of Birmingham University
- Audrey Williams, first woman president of the Royal Institution of South Wales
- Shirley Williams, Baroness Williams of Crosby, first woman chair of the Oxford University Labour Club and first SDP MP
- Dorothy Maud Wrinch, first female Lecturer in Mathematics at Oxford and first woman to receive an Oxford DSc
- Mai Yamani, first Saudi Arabian woman to obtain a M.St. and a D.Phil. from Oxford

== Alumni ==
=== Activists and feminists ===
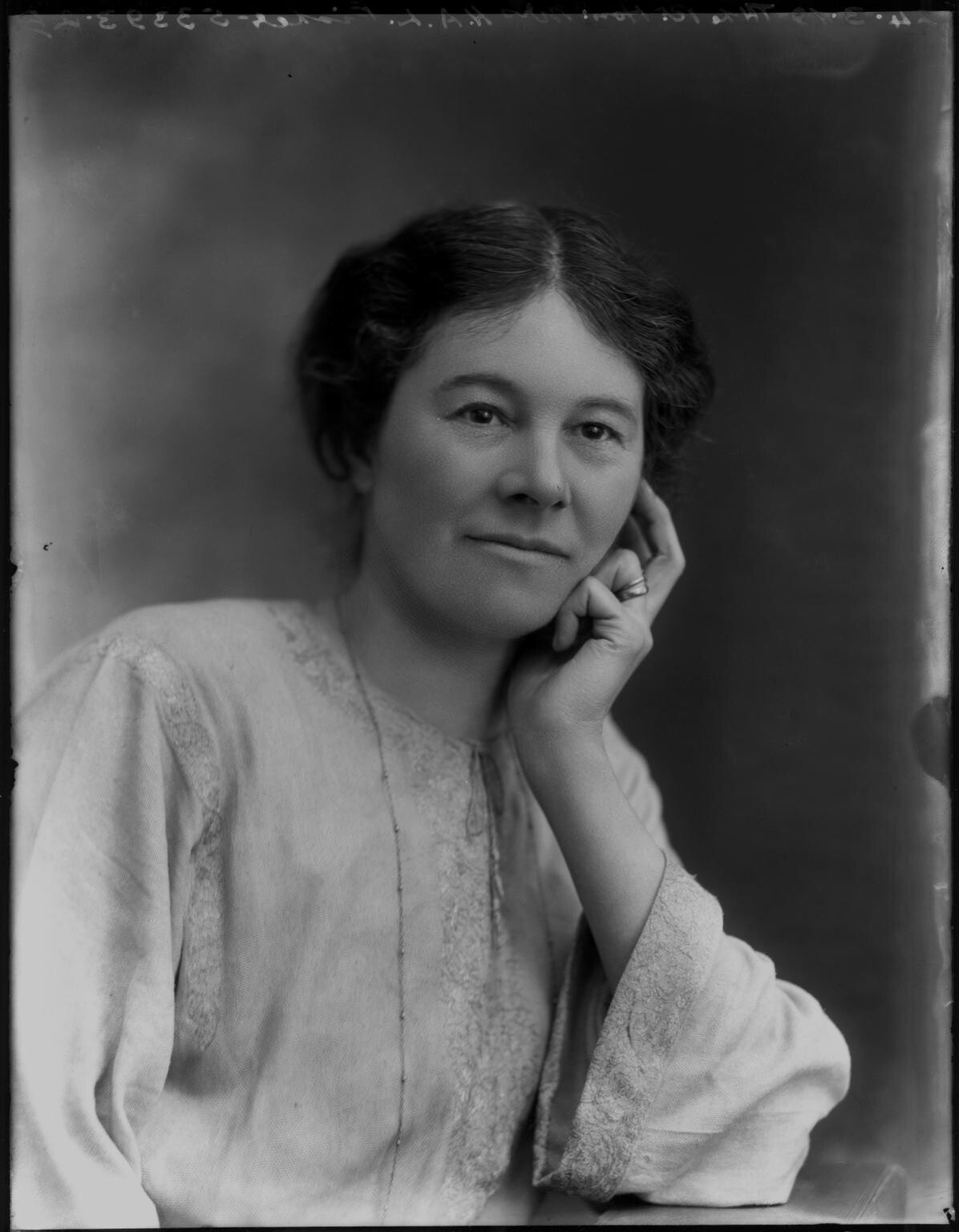
Lettice Fisher

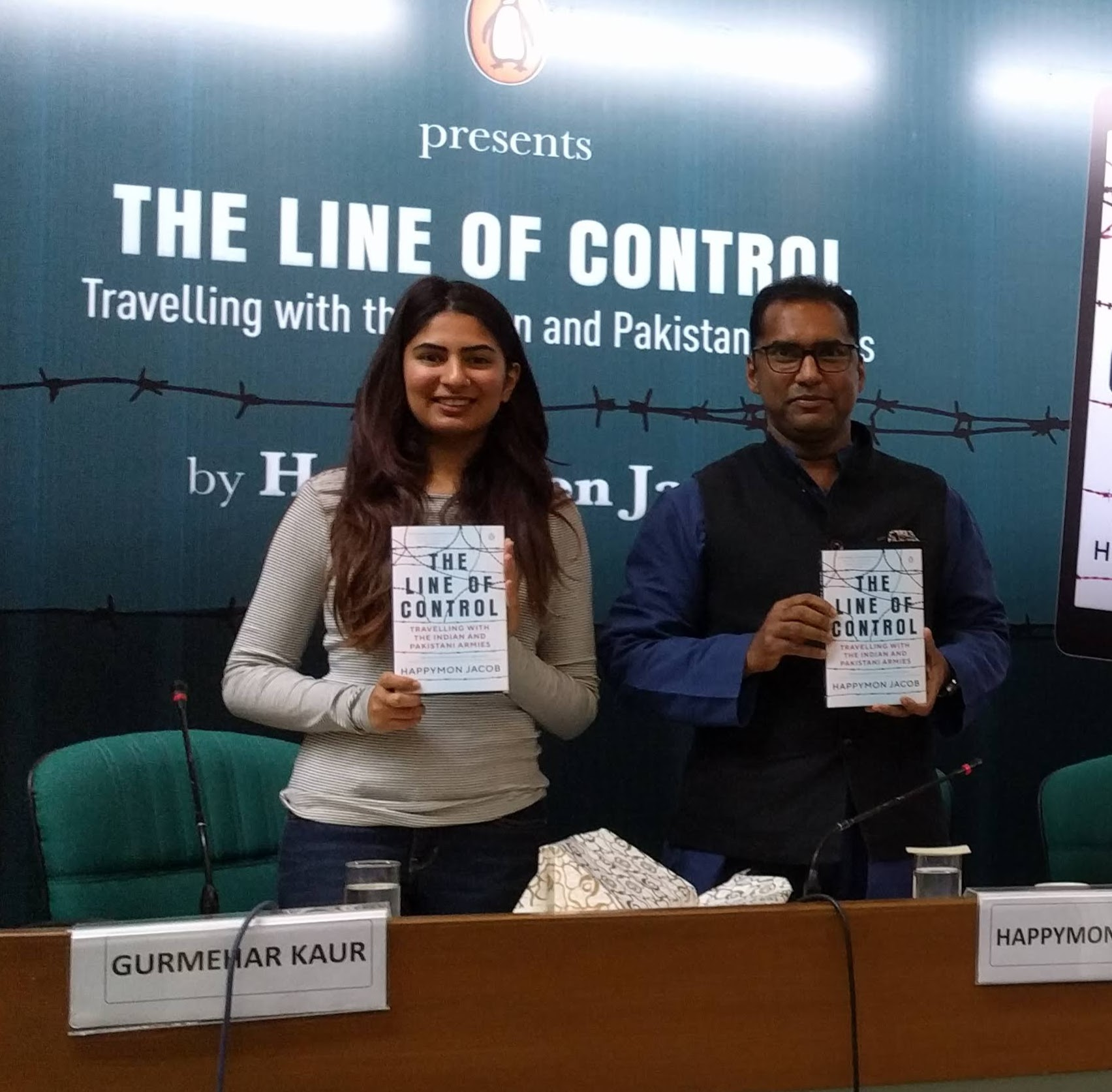
Gurmehar Kaur

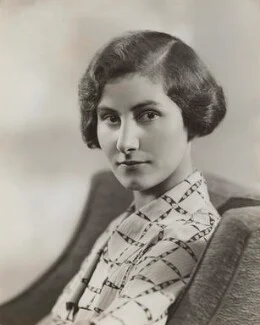
Sheila Lochhead

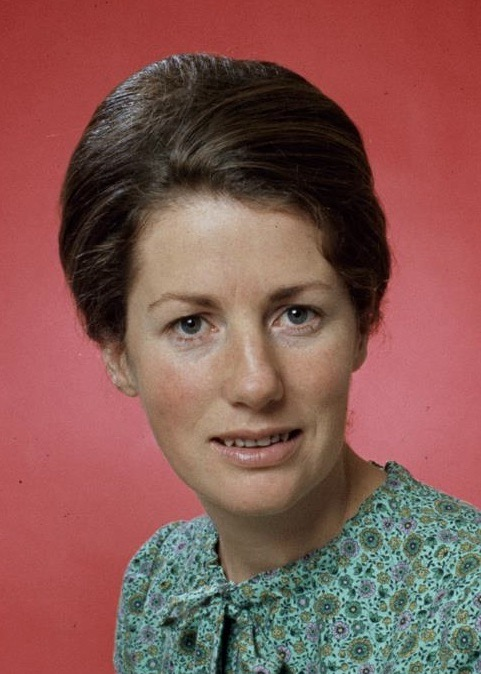
Elizabeth Anne Reid

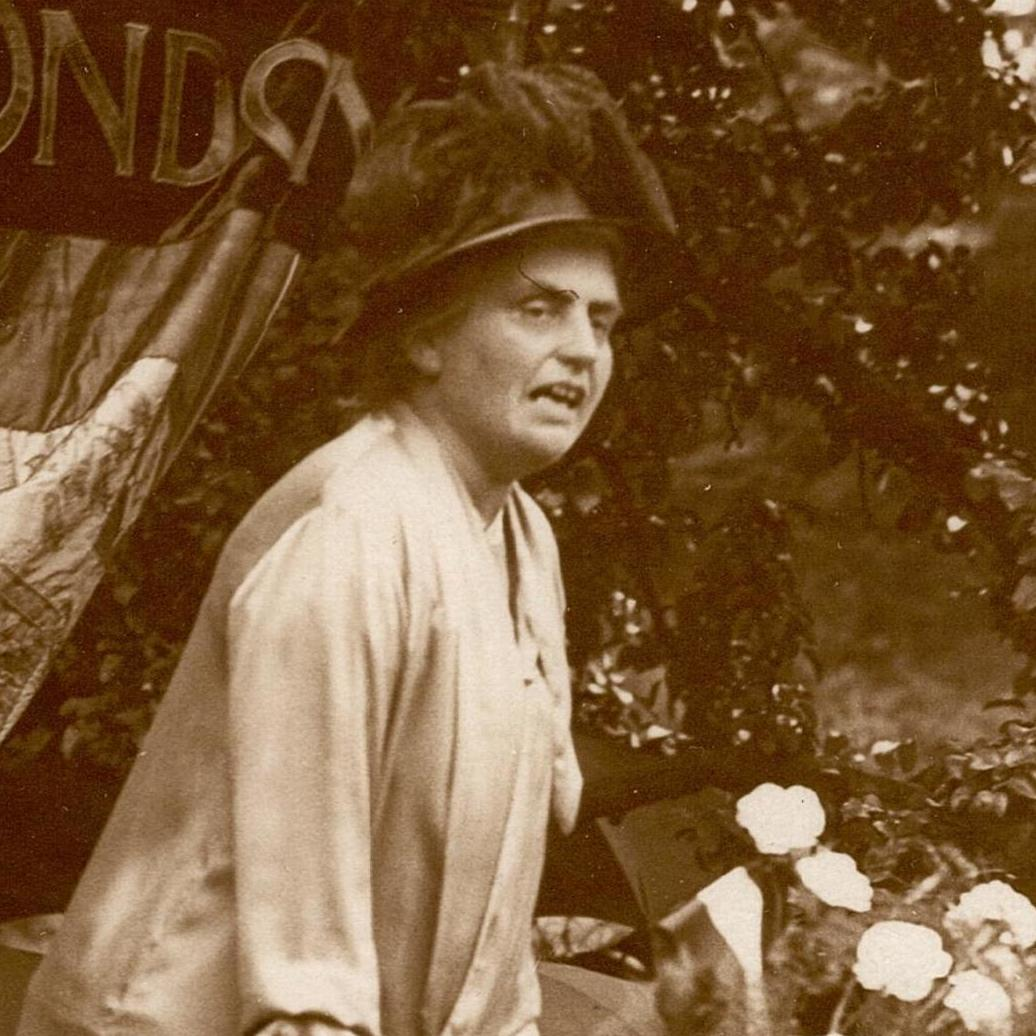
Eleanor Rathbone

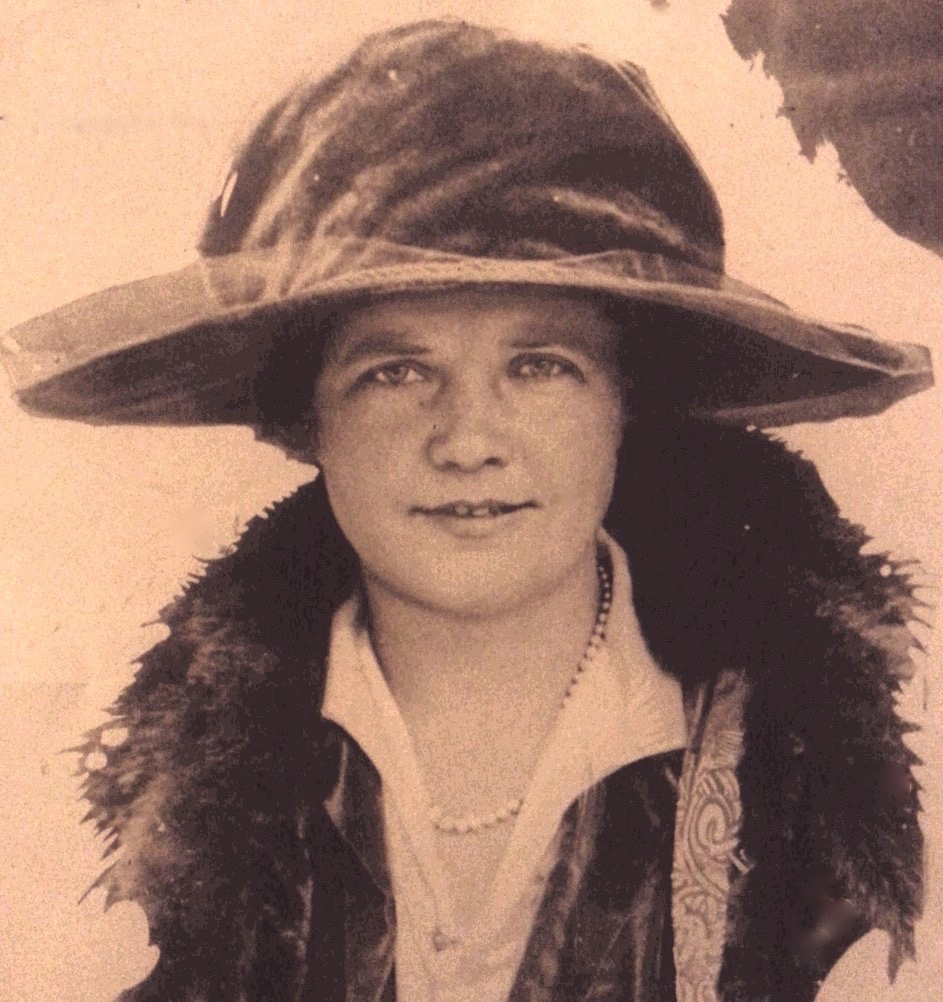
Margaret Mackworth, 2nd Viscountess Rhondda

- Eleanor Acland (1878-1933), a British Liberal Party politician, suffragist, and novelist; President of the Women's Liberal Federation
- Ruth Adler (1944–1994), feminist, human rights campaigner and child welfare advocate; founder of Amnesty International's Scotland and of Scottish Women's Aid and helped to establish the Scottish Child Law Centre
- Dame Hester Adrian, Baroness Adrian (1899-1966), mental health worker; president of the Howard League for Penal Reform
- Rachel Armitage (1873–1955), New Zealand welfare worker and community leader; first New Zealand woman BA to complete a degree at Oxford
- Alison Assiter (1949), Professor of Feminist Theory
- Jasodhara Bagchi (1937–2015), leading Indian feminist critic and activist
- Jane Esdon Brailsford (1874–1937), Scottish suffragette
- Margaret Bramall (1916-2007), social worker and charity director; led the Gingerbread from 1963 to 1979
- Vera Brittain (1893–1970), Voluntary Aid Detachment (VAD) nurse, writer, feminist, and pacifist; author of Testament of Youth
- Stella Browne (1880–1955), Canadian-born feminist, socialist, sex radical, and birth control campaigner; one of the first women to speak out in somewhat offensive ways about her beliefs with a "Forward, Charge!" approach
- Cicely Corbett Fisher (1885–1959), suffragist and workers' rights activist
- Ann Dummett (1930–2012), activist, campaigner for racial justice and published author
- Honora Enfield (1882–1935), co-operative activist and founder of the International Women's Co-operative Guild
- Lilian Faithfull (1865–1952), teacher, headmistress, women's rights advocate, magistrate, social worker and humanitarian; one of the "Steamboat ladies" who were part of the struggle for women to gain university education
- Lettice Fisher (1875–1956), founder of the National Council for the Unmarried Mother and her Child, now known as Gingerbread; wife of H. A. L. Fisher
- Dame Evelyn Fox (1874–1955), noted health worker and driving force for the creation of the British Epilepsy Association (BEA) and National Association for Mental Health (now Mind)
- Julia Gasper, independent academic specialising in historical literature, and a right-wing political activist affiliated with the English Democrats
- Katie Ghose (1970), campaigner and lawyer; Chief Executive of the Women's Aid Federation of England and former Chief Executive of the Electoral Reform Society
- Margaret Hills (1882–1967), teacher, suffragist organiser, feminist and socialist; first female councillor on Stroud District Council
- Clare Hodges (1957–2011), activist who advanced the medical understanding of cannabis and campaigned for its widespread benefit as a therapeutic medicine
- Winifred Holtby (1898–1935), novelist, journalist and suffragist, now best known for her novel South Riding and editor of the feminist magazine Time and Tide. The rights to the book were given to Somerville by Holtby on her death. The Winifred Holtby Memorial Prize was named after her.
- Svava Jakobsdóttir (1930–2004), one of Iceland's foremost 20th-century authors and feminist politicians
- Freshta Karim (1992), Afghan children's rights activist and television presenter; featured in the Forbes 30 Under 30 selection and in the BBC 100 Women in 2021
- Gurmehar Kaur (1996), Indian student activist and author of Small Acts of Freedom; included by Time Magazine in their "10 Next Generation Leaders" list for 2017
- Judith Kazantzis (1940–2018), poet and political and social activist
- Genevieve Lloyd (1941), Australian philosopher and feminist; first female Professor of Philosophy in Australia; author of The Man of Reason
- Sheila MacDonald Lochhead, British prison reform activist, daughter of Prime Minister Ramsay MacDonald
- Florence MacAulay (1862–1945), suffragist; wrote the lyrics to The Women's Marseillaise
- Margaret Mackworth, 2nd Viscountess Rhondda (1883–1958), Welsh peeress, businesswoman, significant suffragette, RMS Lusitania survivor, first female director of the Institute of Directors, founder of Time and Tide and the Six Point Group
- Jenny Manson (1948), British Jewish activist, author, former civil servant, Labour Party councillor and Chair of Jewish Voice for Labour
- Christabel Marshall (1871–1960), campaigner for women's suffrage; playwright and author
- Jean Medawar (1913–2005), author; former chairman of the Family Planning Association; wife of Nobelist Sir Peter Brian Medawar
- Edith Morley OBE (1875–1964), literary scholar, activist and suffragette; first female professor in Britain
- Eddie Ndopu (1990), Namibian human rights and disability advocate; recognized by Pacific Standard as one of their "top 30 thinkers under 30", by Shaw Trust and Powerful Media as one of the 50 most influential people with disabilities in the world, and by South Africa's Mail & Guardian as one of their "top 200 young South Africans"
- Ann Oakley (1944), sociologist, feminist, and writer; author of The Men's Room
- Adelaide Plumptre (1874–1948), Canadian activist, diplomat, and municipal politician in Toronto; first woman elected chair of the Canadian Red Cross, Toronto Board of Education; first woman to sit in the Toronto Board of Control
- Margaret Pyke (1893–1937), family planning activist and pioneer; founding member of the British National Birth Control Committee (NBCC), later known as the Family Planning Association (FPA)
- Eleanor Rathbone (1872–1946), independent MP; long-term campaigner for family allowance and for women's rights; member of the Rathbone family; Somerville's first MP
- Elizabeth Anne Reid (1942), Australian development practitioner, feminist and academic; world's first advisor on women's affairs to a head of government
- Jean Robinson (1896-1963), first blind British woman to graduate from university
- Phoebe Sheavyn (1865-1968), literary scholar and feminist; a professor at Victoria University of Manchester and founding member of the British Federation of University Women
- Lucy Sichone (1954–1998), Zambian civil rights activist; first Zambian woman to receive a Rhodes Scholarship; first woman to have her portrait displayed on the walls of the prestigious Rhodes House
- Angela Sinclair-Loutit (1921–2016), social justice activist, pacifist and nurse; first female member of the Friends' Ambulance Unit.
- Princess Catherine Hilda Duleep Singh (1871–1942), daughter of Maharaja Duleep Singh and suffragist
- Cornelia Sorabji (1866–1954), first woman to practice law in India and Britain; first Indian national to study at any British university
- Hannah Stanton (1913-1993), social worker and anti-apartheid activist
- Radhabai Subbarayan (1891–1960), first female member of the Indian Council of States (Rajya Sabha)
- Summia Tora, Afghan campaigner for women's and refugee rights and a social entrepreneur; included on the BBC's 100 Women list in 2023.
- Farhana Yamin (1965), lawyer, public speaker and climate activist

=== Architects ===
- Bessie Charles (1869–1932), architect; with her sister Ethel the first woman to study architecture at University College London
- Ethel Charles (1871–1962), architect; first woman to be admitted to the Royal Institute of British Architects
- Diana Rowntree (1915–2008), architect and architectural writer; first architectural writer for The Guardian

=== Archivists ===
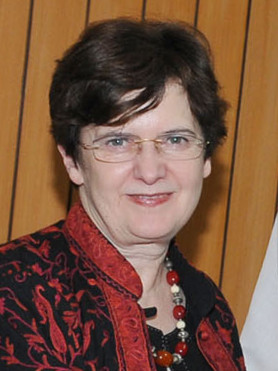
Alice Prochaska

- Sonia Anderson (1944–2020), archivist
- Alice Prochaska (1947), former archivist and librarian; Principal of Somerville College
- Joan Sinar (1925–2015), archivist who set up the county record offices for Devon and Derbyshire

=== Artists ===
- Fanchon Fröhlich (1922 – 2020), American artist
- Holly Somerville, botanical artist

=== Authors ===
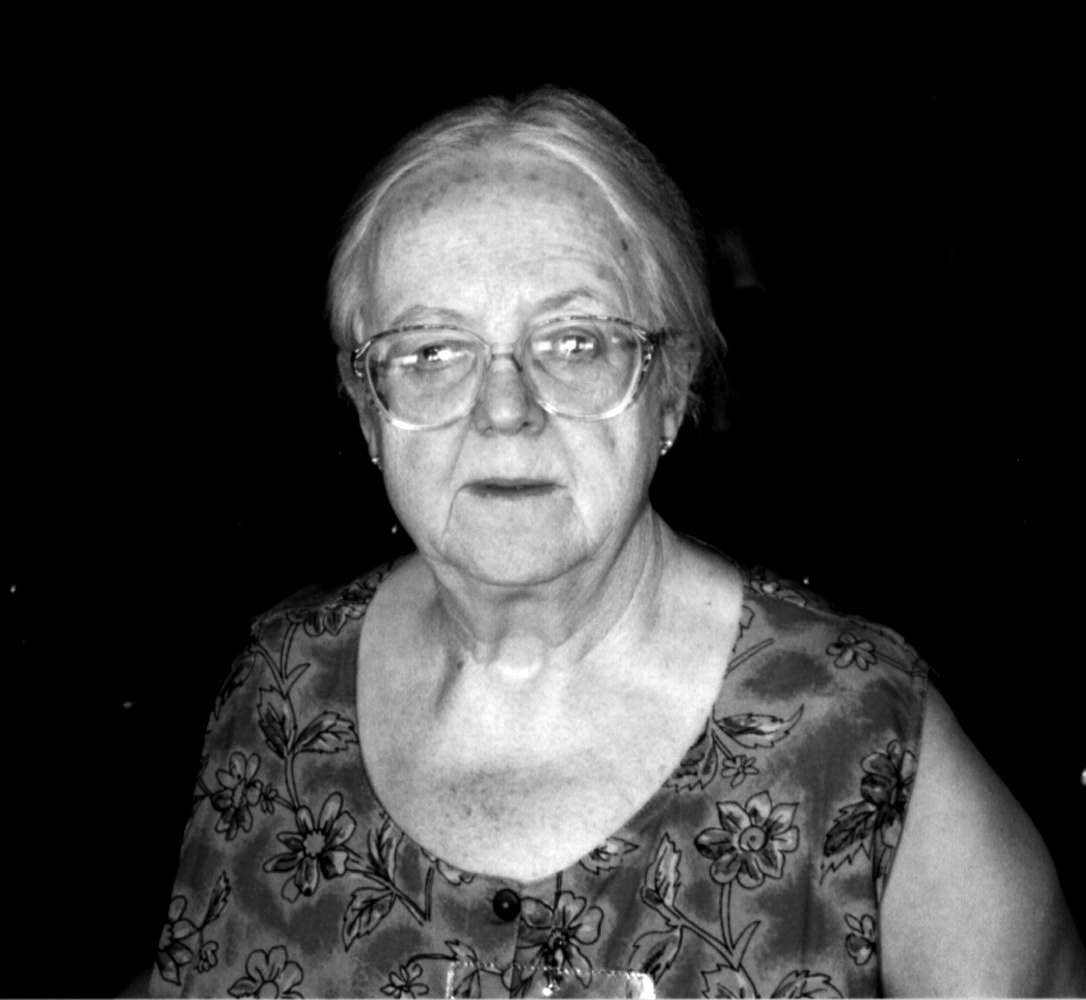
Marjorie Boulton

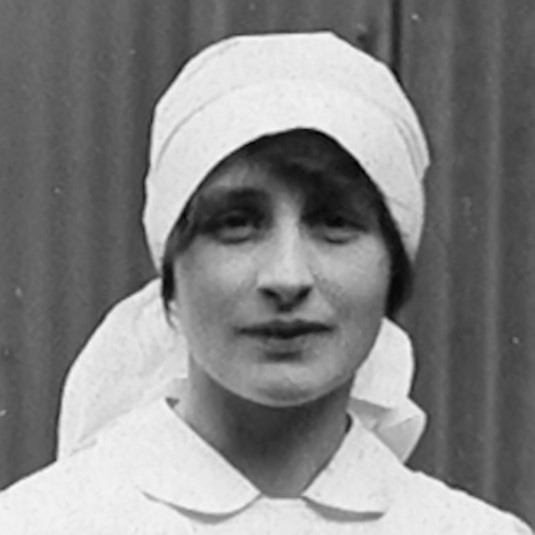
Vera Brittain

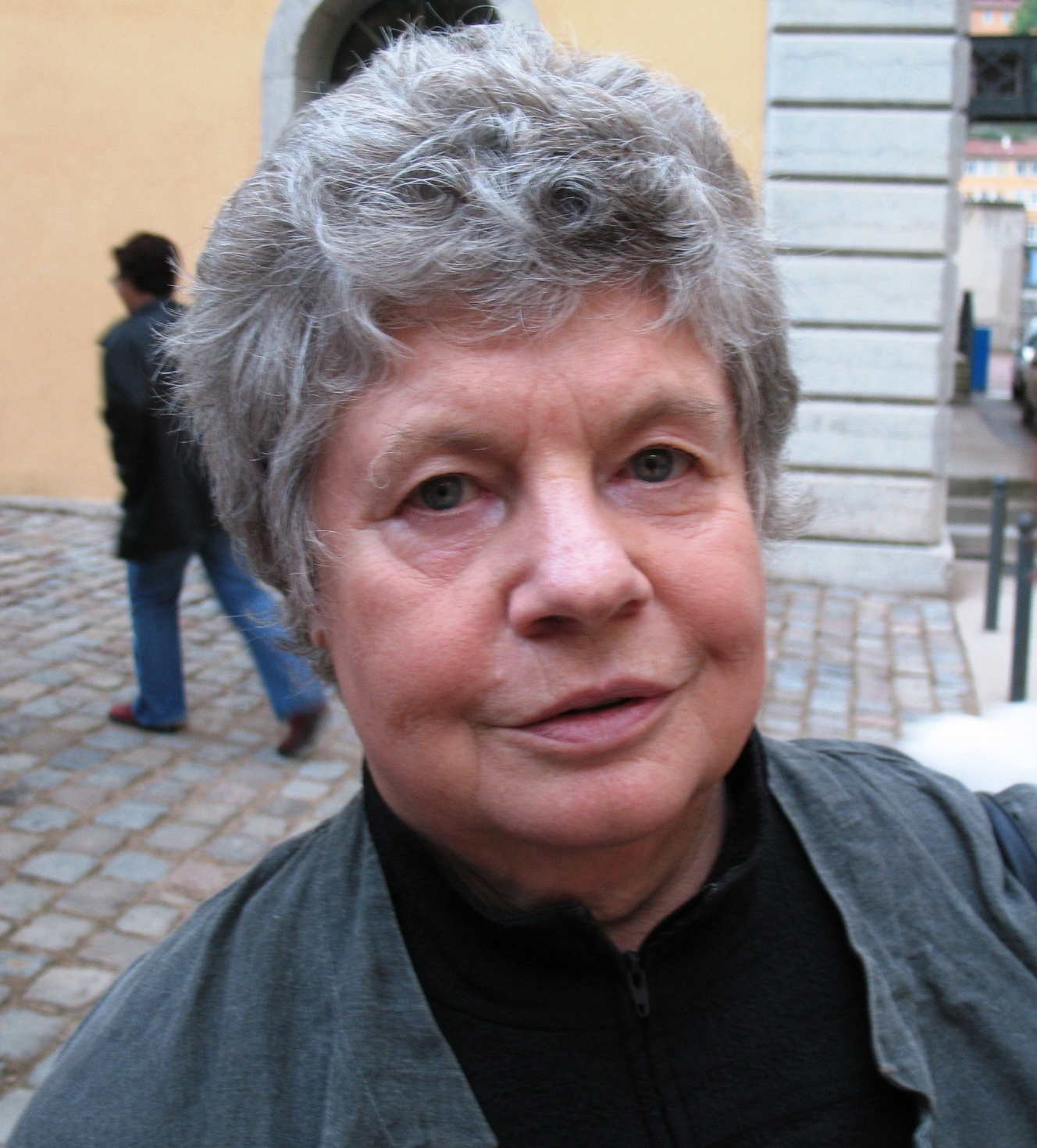
A. S. Byatt

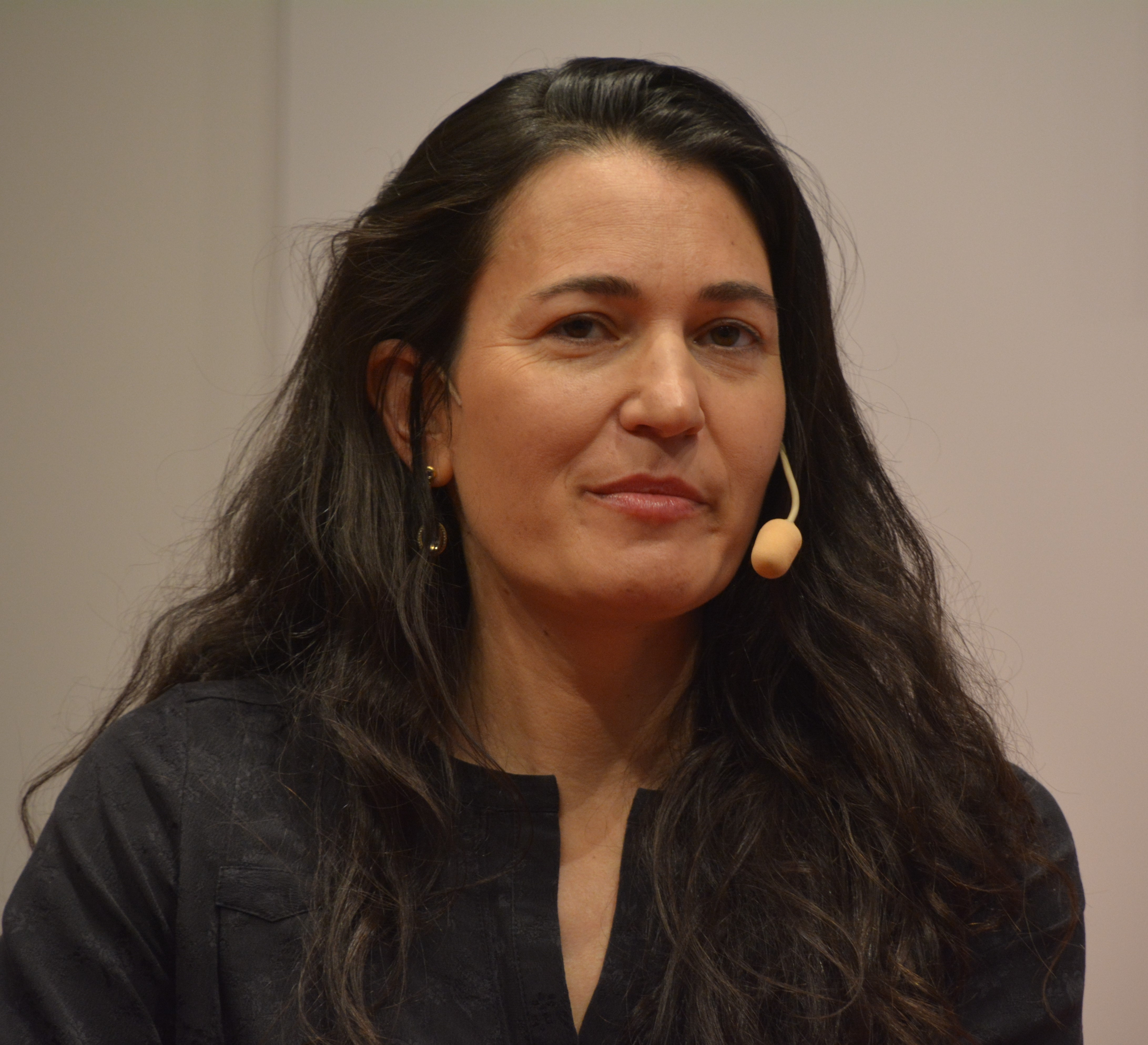
Nicole Krauss

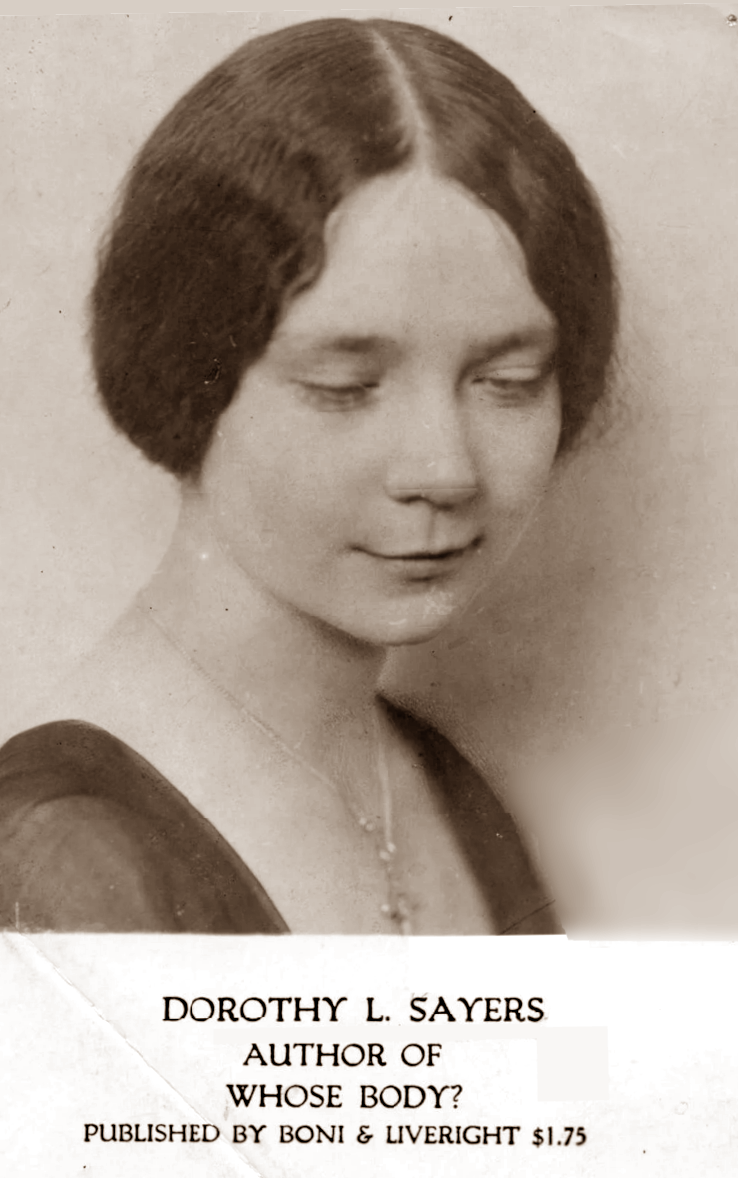
Dorothy L. Sayers

- Janet Adam Smith (1905–1999), writer, editor, literary journalist and champion of Scottish literature; assistant editor of The Listener
- Caroline Alexander (1956), American author and classicist; first woman to publish a full-length English translation of Homer's Iliad
- Jo Baker (1973), writer; author of Longbourn
- Elspeth Barker (1940), Scottish novelist and journalist
- Reem Bassiouney (1973), Egyptian author and professor of sociolinguistics; Sawiris Cultural Award winner
- Nina Bawden (1925–2012), novelist and children's writer; shortlisted for the Booker Prize and Lost Man Booker Prize; one of very few who have both served as a Booker judge and made a Booker shortlist as an author; winner of the Guardian Prize and Phoenix Award
- Lucy M. Boston (1892–1990), novelist who wrote for children and adults; best known for her "Green Knowe" series; winner of the Carnegie Medal
- Marjorie Boulton (1924–2017), author and poet writing in both English and Esperanto
- Vera Brittain (1893–1970), Voluntary Aid Detachment (VAD) nurse, writer, feminist, and pacifist; author of Testament of Youth
- Christine Brooke-Rose (1923–2012), writer and literary critic, known principally for her later, experimental novels
- Dame A. S. Byatt (1936-2023), novelist, poet and Booker Prize and Erasmus Prize winner; one of The 50 greatest British writers since 1945; author of Possession: A Romance
- Lady Susan Chitty (1929-2021), novelist and a writer of biographies
- Elizabeth Coxhead (1909-1979), novelist, biographer, literary critic, journalist and mountaineer
- Anne Crone (1915–1972), Irish novelist and teacher
- Rosemary Dinnage (1928–2015), author and critic; listed by The Observer as one of Britain's top 300 intellectuals in 2011
- Isabel Don (1854-1896), Scottish writer and principal of Aberdare Hall
- Gertrude Minnie Faulding (1875–1961), novelist and children's writer
- Geraldine Penrose Fitzgerald (1846–1939), Irish novelist and catholic convert; arguably the first Catholic Oxford woman student
- Penelope Fitzgerald (1916–2000), writer, Booker Prize winner, one of The 50 greatest British writers since 1945; her final novel, The Blue Flower is seen as one of "the ten best historical novels" and won the National Book Critics Circle Award
- Margaret Forster (1938–2016), novelist, biographer, memoirist, historian and literary critic; author of Georgy Girl and Diary of an Ordinary Woman
- Charis Frankenburg (1892–1985), author; one of the first women eligible for a degree from the University of Oxford; founder of one of the first birth control clinics in England outside London
- Celia Fremlin (1914–2009), writer of mystery fiction; winner of the Edgar Award
- Maggie Gee (1948), novelist, one of six women among the 20 writers on the Granta Best of Young British Novelists list in 1983; first female Chair of the Royal Society of Literature (RSL)
- Victoria Glendinning (1937), biographer, critic, broadcaster and novelist; honorary vice-president of English PEN; winner of the James Tait Black Memorial Prize; Vice-president of the Royal Society of Literature
- Judith Grossman, American writer
- Alix Hawley (1975), Canadian novelist
- Emma Henderson (1958), author; shortlisted for the Women's Prize for Fiction
- Joanna Hines (1949), writer
- Jane Aiken Hodge (1917–2009), American-born writer, daughter of Conrad Aiken
- Winifred Holtby (1898–1935), novelist, journalist and suffragist, now best known for her novel South Riding and editor of the feminist magazine Time and Tide. The rights to the book were given to Somerville by Holtby on her death. The Winifred Holtby Memorial Prize was named after her.
- Muriel Jaeger (1892–1969), author who wrote early novels of science fiction as well as plays and non-fiction
- Svava Jakobsdóttir (1930–2004), one of Iceland's foremost 20th Century authors and feminist politicians
- Liz Jensen (1959), novelist
- Daisy Johnson (1990), writer; youngest author to be shortlisted for the Booker Prize; winner of the Edge Hill Short Story Prize
- Margaret Kennedy (1896–1967), novelist and playwright; author of The Constant Nymph
- Nicole Krauss (1974), American author best known for her four novels Man Walks Into a Room, The History of Love, Great House and Forest Dark (which won an award from the Anisfield-Wolf Book Awards); selected as one of The New Yorker's "20 Under 40" writers to watch.
- Marghanita Laski (1915–1988), journalist, radio panellist and novelist
- Margaret Leigh (1894–1973), writer who lived extensively in Scotland and wrote about life in crofting communities
- Gillian Linscott (1944), author and winner of the CWA Historical Dagger
- Dame Rose Macaulay (1881–1958), writer, most noted for her novel The Towers of Trebizond; James Tait Black Memorial Prize winner
- Sheila MacLeod (1939), Scottish author and feminist
- Elizabeth Macneal (1988), author known for her book The Doll Factorý
- Amphilis Throckmorton Middlemore (1891–1931), British writer and teacher
- Dame Iris Murdoch (1919–1999), novelist and philosopher born in Ireland; twelfth on a list of The 50 greatest British writers since 1945 and winner of the Booker Prize; author of Under the Net, listed in the Modern Library 100 Best Novels
- Kathleen Nott (1905–1999), poet, novelist, critic, philosopher and editor
- Christine Orr (1899–1963), Scottish novelist, playwright, poet, actor, theatre director and broadcaster; one of the "uninvited eight" instrumental in the founding of the Edinburgh Festival Fringe; one of only three women making a salary over £500 at the BBC before WWII
- Inez Pearn (1913–1976), novelist
- Hilda Stewart Reid (1898–1982), novelist and historian
- Michèle Roberts (1949), novelist and poet; shortlisted for the Booker Prize and Chevalier de l'Ordre des Arts et des Lettres
- Constance Savery (1897–1999), author of novels and children's books
- Dorothy L. Sayers (1893–1957), crime writer, poet and playwright; creator of Lord Peter Wimsey; translated Dante's Divine Comedy
- Neil Spring (1981), Welsh novelist of supernatural horror, known for his bestselling book The Ghost Hunters (2013)
- Hilary Spurling (1940), writer, journalist and biographer; winner of the Whitbread Prize
- Alexander Starritt (1985), Scottish-German novelist, journalist and entrepreneur
- Clara Linklater Thomson (1867-1934), writer, editor, and educator
- Sylvia Thompson (1902–1968), novelist, writer and public speaker
- Doreen Wallace (1897–1989), novelist, grammar school teacher and social campaigner
- Laura Wilson (1964), crime-writer; winner of the Prix du Polar Européen and CWA Historical Dagger and shortlisted for the Gold Dagger
- Elizabeth Young, Baroness Kennet (1923–2014), writer, researcher, poet, artist, campaigner, analyst and questioning commentator

==== Children's writers ====
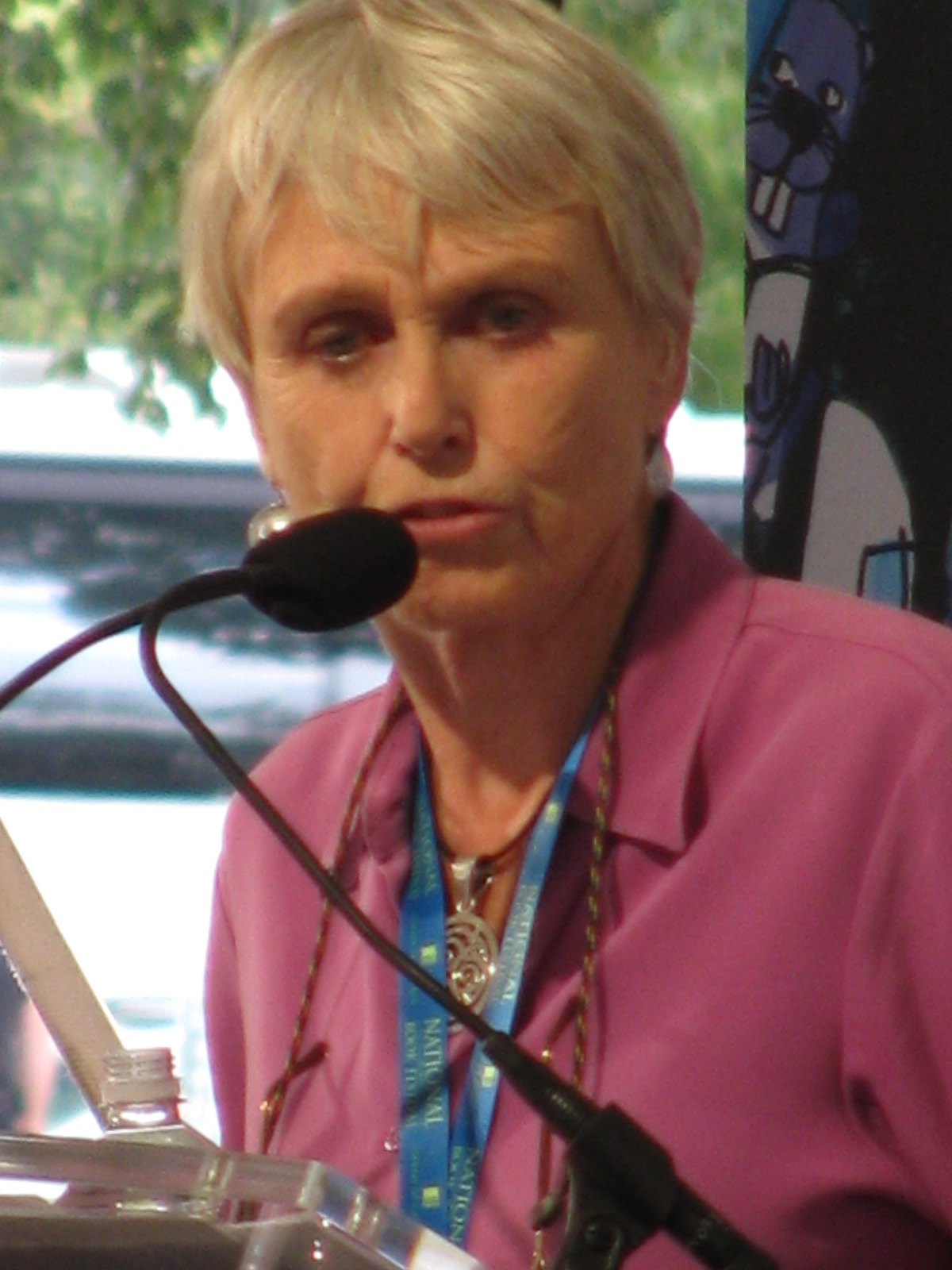
Susan Cooper

- Nina Bawden (1925–2012), novelist and children's writer; shortlisted for the Booker Prize and Lost Man Booker Prize; one of very few to serve both as a Booker judge and make a Booker shortlist as an author; winner of the Guardian Prize and Phoenix Award
- Lucy M. Boston (1892–1990), novelist who wrote for children and adults; best known for her "Green Knowe" series; winner of the Carnegie Medal
- Kathryn Cave (1948–2021), hildren's book author; awarded the first international UNESCO prize for Children's and Young People's Literature in the Service of Tolerance for Something Else
- Pauline Clarke (1921–2013), author who wrote for younger children; best known for her The Twelve and the Genii; winner of the Carnegie Medal, Deutscher Jugendliteraturpreis and Lewis Carroll Shelf Award
- Olivia Coolidge (1908–2006), British-born American children's writer and educator; runner-up for the Newbery Medal
- Susan Cooper (1935), author of children's books including The Dark Is Rising; winner of the Newbery Medal and Margaret A. Edwards Award; first woman to edit the Oxford undergraduate newspaper Cherwell
- Gillian Cross (1945), author of children's books; winner of the Carnegie Medal and Costa Book Award; author of The Demon Headmaster
- Gertrude Minnie Faulding (1875–1961), novelist and children's writer
- Frances Hardinge (1973), children's writer; author of Fly by Night and The Lie Tree; winner of the Branford Boase Award and Costa Book Award
- Clare Mallory (1913–1991), children's writer from New Zealand
- Constance Savery (1897–1999), author of novels and children's books
- Ann Schlee (1934), novelist and children's writer; winner of the Guardian Children's Fiction Prize, shortlisted for the Booker Prize and runner up for the Carnegie Medal
- Matthew Skelton (1971), English Canadian writer; author of Endymion Spring
- Jenifer Wayne (1917–1982), author of children's literature

==== Playwrights ====
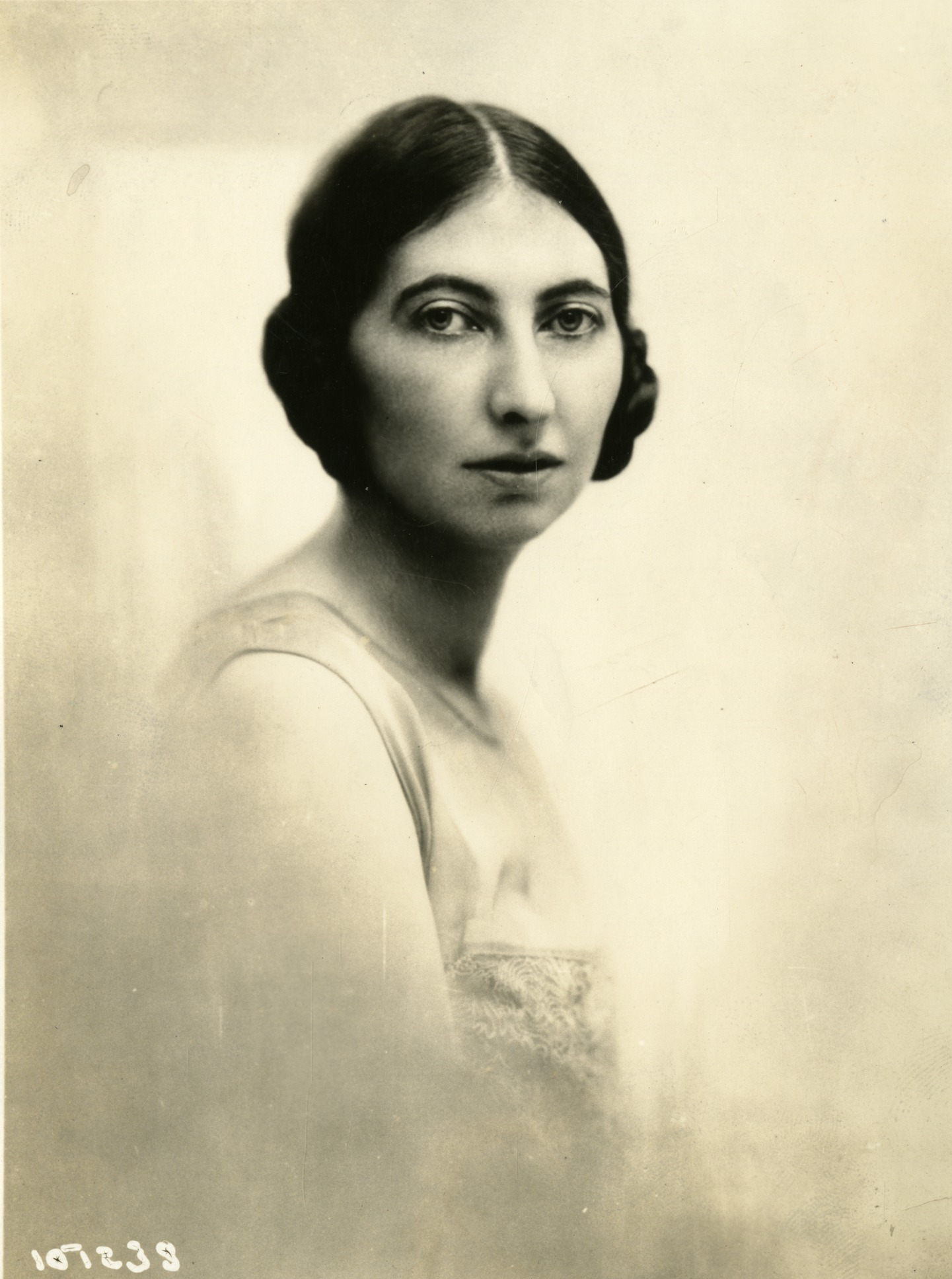
Margaret Kennedy

- Marcy Kahan, Canadian-American playwright and radio dramatist; winner of the Edinburgh Comedy Award and a Silver Radio Academy Award
- Margaret Kennedy (1896–1967), novelist and playwright; author of The Constant Nymph
- Nemone Lethbridge (1932), barrister and playwright; one of Britain's first female barristers and the first woman at Hare Court
- Christine Longford, Countess of Longford (1900–1980), playwright; wife of Edward Pakenham, 6th Earl of Longford
- Christabel Marshall (1871–1960), LGBT campaigner for women's suffrage; playwright and author
- Peter Morris (1973), American playwright; writer of Guardians
- Ella Road (1991), screenwriter, playwright and actor, best known for her stage-play The Phlebotomist

==== Poets ====
- Audrey Beecham (1915–1989), poet, teacher and historian, niece of the composer; Maurice Bowra, Warden of Wadham and Vice-Chancellor of Oxford was engaged to her
- Catherine Byron (1947), Irish poet who often collaborates with visual and sound artists
- Viola Garvin (1898–1969), poet and literary editor at The Observer; Robert E. Howard used lines from her "The House of Cæsar" for his suicide note
- Judith Kazantzis (1940–2018), poet and political and social activist; daughter of Lord and Lady Longford
- May Kendall (1861–1943), poet, novelist, and satirist
- Mairi MacInnes (1925-2017), poet
- Aaron Maniam (1979), award-winning poet and civil servant
- Elma Mitchell (1919–2000), poet; winner of the Cholmondeley Award
- Denise Riley (1948), poet and philosopher; winner of the Forward Poetry Prize
- Nesca Robb (1905–1976), Irish poet, writer and historian scholar; member of the Maatschappij der Nederlandse Letterkunde
- E. J. Scovell (1907–1999), poet
- Margaret Stanley-Wrench (1916–1974), poet and novelist
- Kim Taplin (1943), poet and non-fiction writer
- Helen Waddell (1889–1965), Irish poet, translator and playwright; winner of the Benson Medal
- Val Warner (1946-2020), poet, editor and translator who was best known for helping to increase the salience of poet Charlotte Mew's work, received the Eric Gregory Award

=== Business & finance people ===
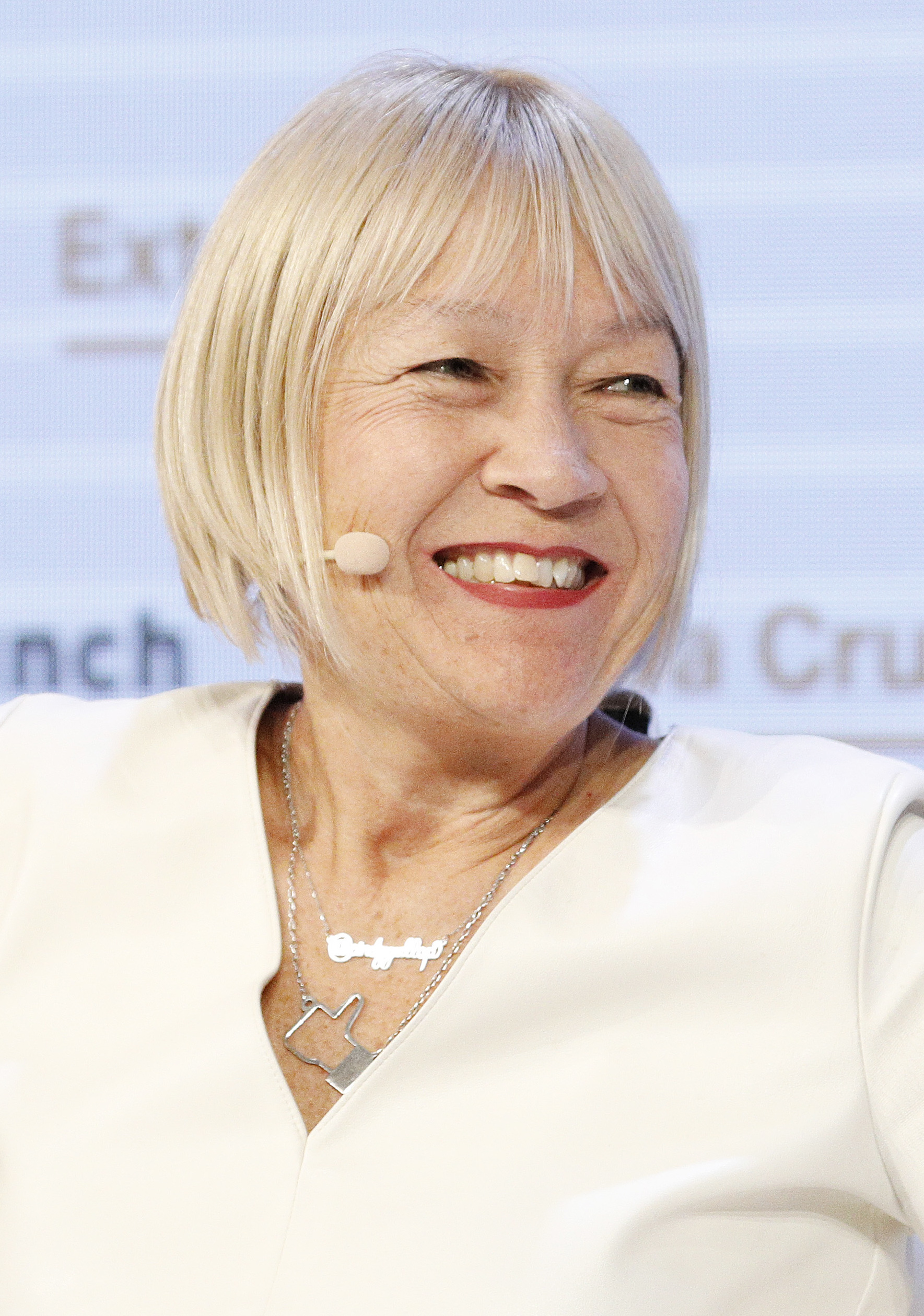
Cindy Gallop

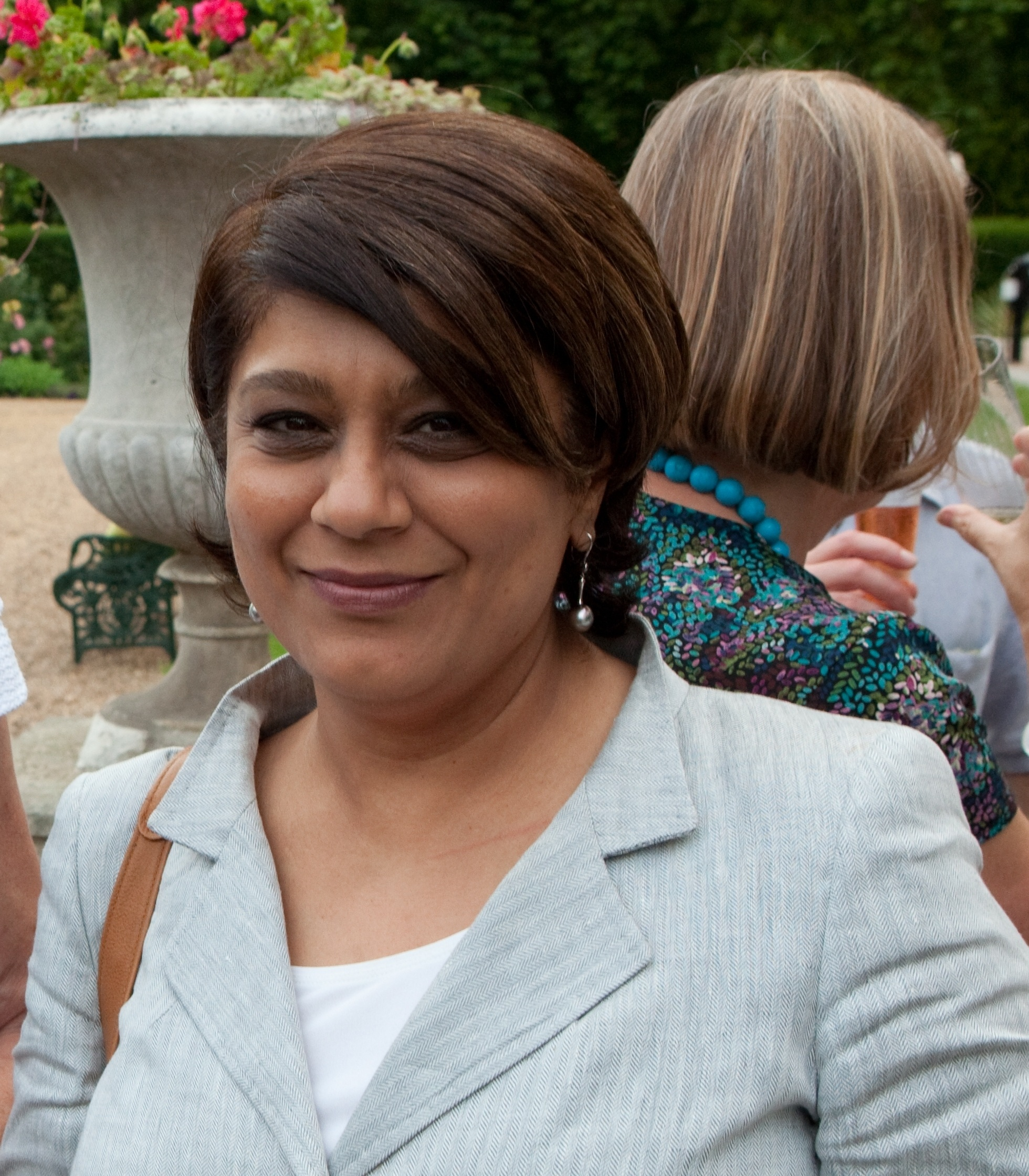
Shriti Vadera, Baroness Vadera

- Marjorie Abbatt (1899–1991), toy maker and businesswoman; President of the International Council for Children's Play
- Goga Ashkenazi (1980), Kazakh businesswoman and socialite; head of Vionnet
- Margaret Casely-Hayford (1959), lawyer and businesswoman; chairs the board of Shakespeare's Globe; former chair of ActionAid; first female Chancellor of Coventry University; first black woman to be Partner in a City law firm
- Angela Dean, banker and trustee; one of the '100 women to watch' in the Female FTSE Board Report in 2013 and 2014; managing director of Morgan Stanley; Chair of the International House London
- Cindy Gallop (1960), advertising consultant, founder and former chair of the US branch of advertising firm Bartle Bogle Hegarty; founder of the IfWeRanTheWorld and MakeLoveNotPorn companies
- Suzanne Heywood (1969), executive and former civil servant; chair of CNH Industrial
- Afua Kyei, British financial executive and the Chief Financial Officer (CFO) of the Bank of England; included as one of the most influential black people in the UK on the 2024 Powerlist; in 2023 listed among the 100 most reputable Africans
- Catherine Powell (1967), businesswoman, President of the Disney Parks, Western Region, where she oversees Disneyland, Walt Disney World, and Disneyland Paris
- Shriti Vadera, Baroness Vadera PC (1962), investment banker and politician; government minister and Chairwoman of Santander UK; first woman to head a major British bank; first woman and first person of colour to chair the Royal Shakespeare Company

=== Civil servants and diplomats ===
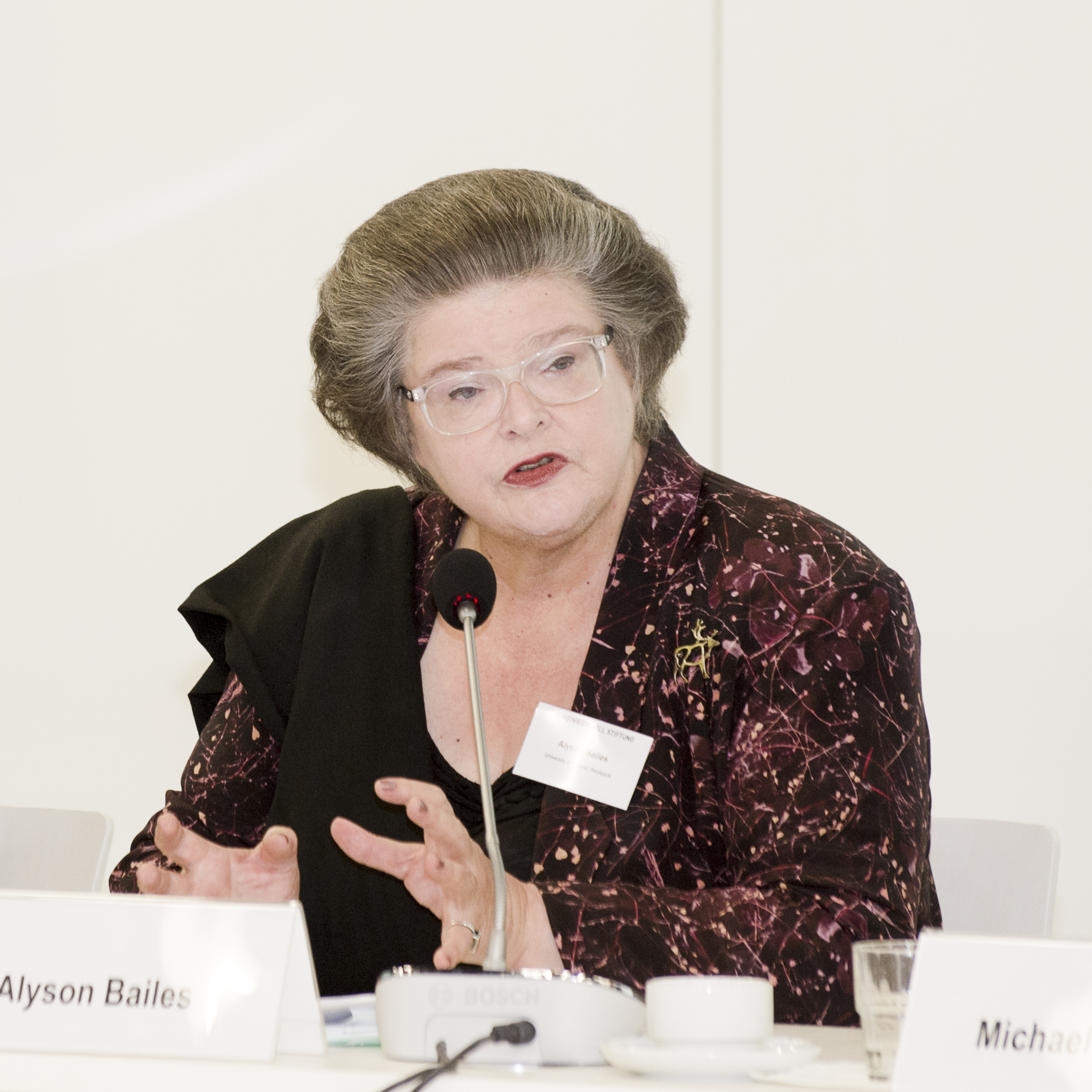
Alyson Bailes

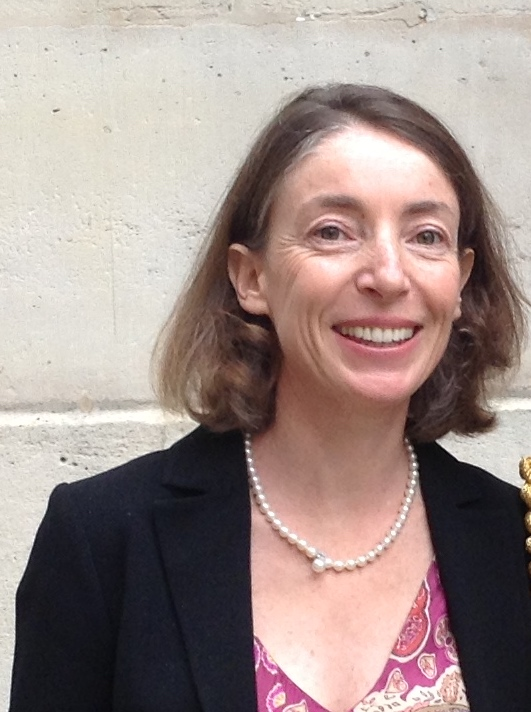
Emma Sky

- Manel Abeysekera (1933), Sri Lanka's first woman career diplomat and ambassador
- Alyson Bailes (1949–2016), diplomat, political scientist, academic and polyglot
- Gill Bennett, Chief Historian of the Foreign and Commonwealth Office between 1995 and 2005
- Dame Gillian Brown (1923–1999), diplomat; second woman to be a British ambassador
- Dame Mary Keegan (1953), accountant and civil servant; chair of the Financial Reporting Council; first female audit partner at PwC
- Dame Alix Kilroy (1903–1999), one of the first two women to have entered the administrative grade of the civil service by examination (in 1925); founding member of the SDP
- Emily Maltman, British Ambassador to the Democratic Republic of Congo
- Aaron Maniam (1979), award-winning poet and civil servant
- Dame Rosalind Marsden (1950), diplomat and public servant; Ambassador and EUSR of Sudan
- Monica Milne MBE (1917-1980), civil servant; first woman to be appointed to the permanent staff of the Foreign Office
- Dame Anne Mueller (1930–2000), civil servant and academic; first woman to become a Permanent Secretary at HM Treasury; Chancellor of De Montfort University
- Nozipho Mxakato-Diseko (1956), South African diplomat, currently the United Nations Ambassador for South Africa; for the Paris Agreement she was the leader of the G77 bloc during negotiations
- Adelaide Plumptre (1874–1948), Canadian activist, diplomat, and municipal politician in Toronto First woman elected chair of the Canadian Red Cross, Toronto Board of Education; first woman to sit in the Toronto Board of Control
- Jill Rutter, civil servant
- Catherine Royle (1963), British Ambassador; Principal of Somerville College
- Dame Evelyn Sharp, Baroness Sharp (1903–1985), civil servant; first woman to hold the position of Permanent Secretary
- Emma Sky (1968), expert on the Middle East; political advisor to General Ray Odierno
- Ruth Thompson (1953–2016), civil servant; director of finance of Higher Education at the DES
- Dame Anne Warburton (1927–2015), diplomat; first female British ambassador; President of Lucy Cavendish College, Cambridge
- Carrie Yau (1955), Hong Kong government official; executive director of the Vocational Training Council

=== Education ===
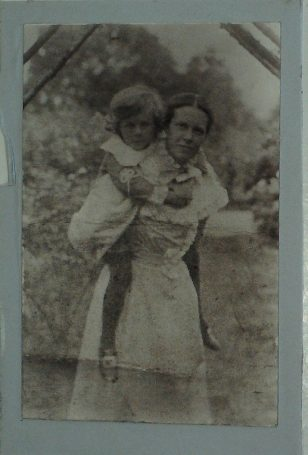
Julia Huxley

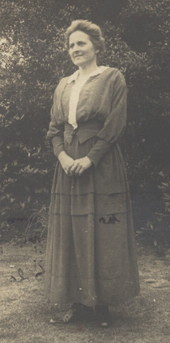
Agnes de Selincourt

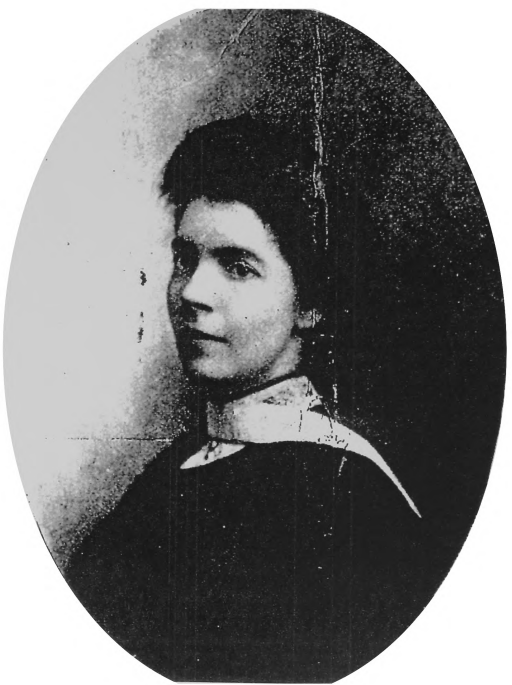
Hilda D. Oakeley

- Jane Aaron (1951), Welsh educator, literary researcher and writer
- Marian Gertrude Beard (1885–1958), Irish-born educator and translator; headmistress of Putney High School
- Lalage Bown (1927), educator; first organizing secretary of the International Congress of Africanists; first woman to receive the William Pearson Tolley Award from Syracuse University
- Alice Bruce (1867–1951), educator and school administrator; long serving staff member of Somerville Hall and President of Aberdare Hall in Cardiff
- C. Violet Butler (1884-1982), social researcher and educator
- Alice Mackenzie Cameron (1891-1964), educator who campaigned against unemployment
- Hilda Cashmore (1876-1943), a Quaker who founded the Bristol University Settlement and was its first warden
- Dame Elan Closs Stephens (1948), Welsh educator; pro-chancellor of Aberystwyth University; Chair of the BBC (2023–2024)
- Agnes de Selincourt (1872–1917), Christian missionary in India, responsible for the founding of missions; first Principal of Lady Muir Memorial College, Allahabad, India; Principal of Westfield College, London
- Donalda Dickie (1883–1972), Canadian normal school teacher; winner of the Governor General's Award for English-language children's literature
- Flora Forster (1896–1981), Welsh educator and author
- Ethel Hurlbatt (1866–1934), Principal of Bedford College, London; first President of Aberdare Hall in Cardiff; later Warden of Royal Victoria College, the women's college of McGill University, in Montreal, Canada
- Julia Huxley (1862–1908), founded Prior's Field School for girls; the game word ladder was devised for her
- Dame Tamsyn Imison (1937–2017), educator and "educational strategist"; headteacher of the Hampstead School
- Sonia Jackson (1934), Emeritus Professor at the UCL Institute of Education; specialised in Early Childhood Education and Care (ECEC)
- Lettice Jowitt (1878–1962), educationist and refugee worker; pioneer in the settlement movement
- Jane Kirkaldy (1869–1932), science educator at various schools in Oxford for 36 years; one of the first women to obtain first-class honors in the natural sciences; contributed greatly to the education of the generation of English women scientists
- Edith Marvin (1872–1958), inspector of schools
- Winifred Mercier (1878-1934), principal of Whitelands College and advocate of co-educational classes
- Michele Moody-Adams, philosopher; first female and first African-American dean of Columbia University
- Dame Anne Mueller (1930–2000), civil servant and academic; first woman to become a Permanent Secretary at HM Treasury; Chancellor of De Montfort University
- Elisabeth Murray (1909–1998), English biographer and educationist
- Hilda D. Oakeley (1867–1950), philosopher, educationalist and author; first Warden of the new Royal Victoria College; first woman to deliver McGill's annual university lecture
- May Staveley (1863–1934), first warden of Bristol's women's university settlement (Clifton Hill House); head of the women's hall of residence at Liverpool University; president of the Bristol branch of the International Federation of University Women
- Mary Sturt (1896-1993), educational psychologist and historian of education
- Jean Wilks (1917–2014), headmistress at The Hertfordshire and Essex High School and King Edward VI High School for Girls; first female Pro-Chancellor of Birmingham University
- Olive Willis (1877–1964), educationist and headmistress; founded Downe House School and was its head

==== Oxbridge heads of houses ====
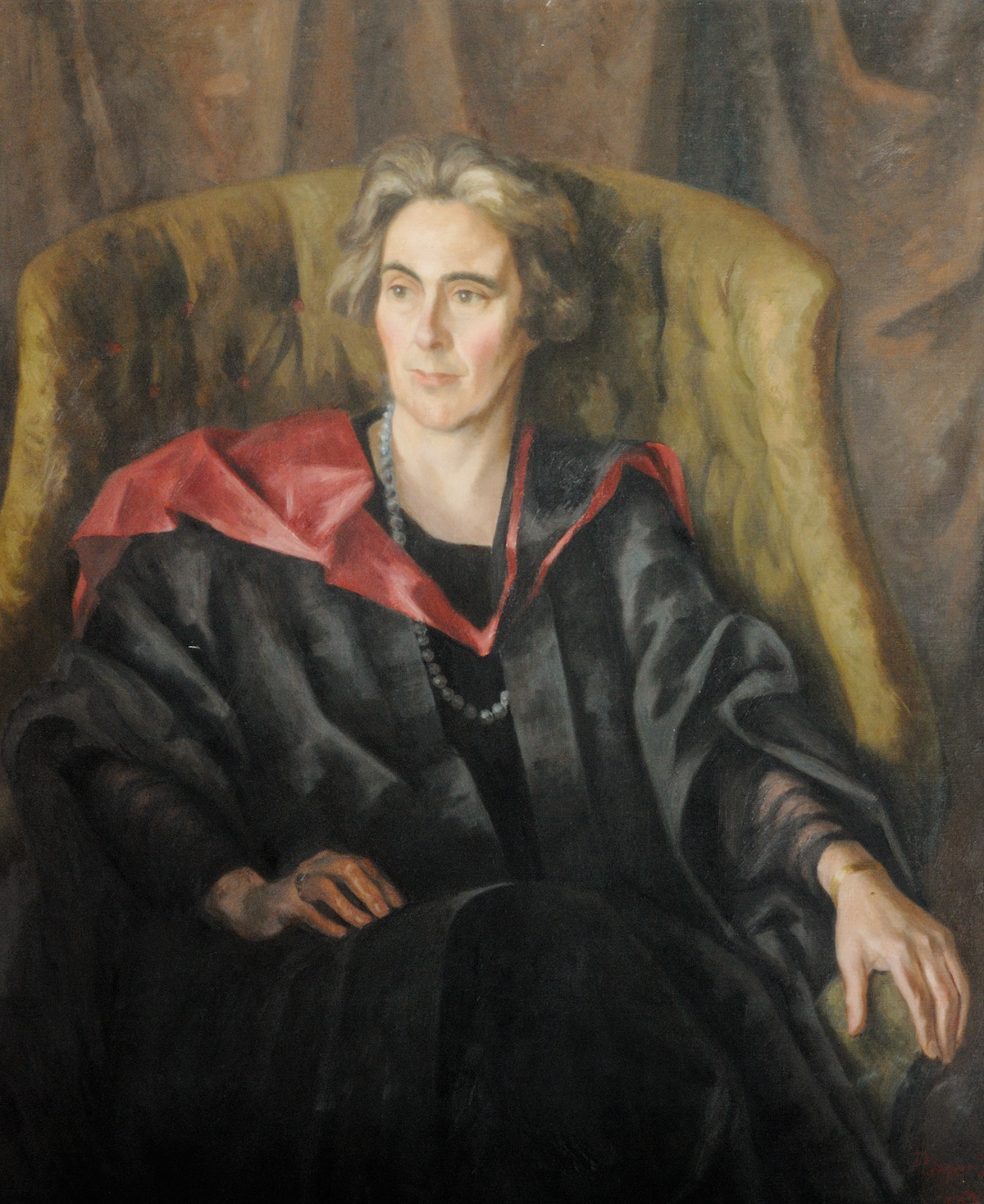
Margery Fry

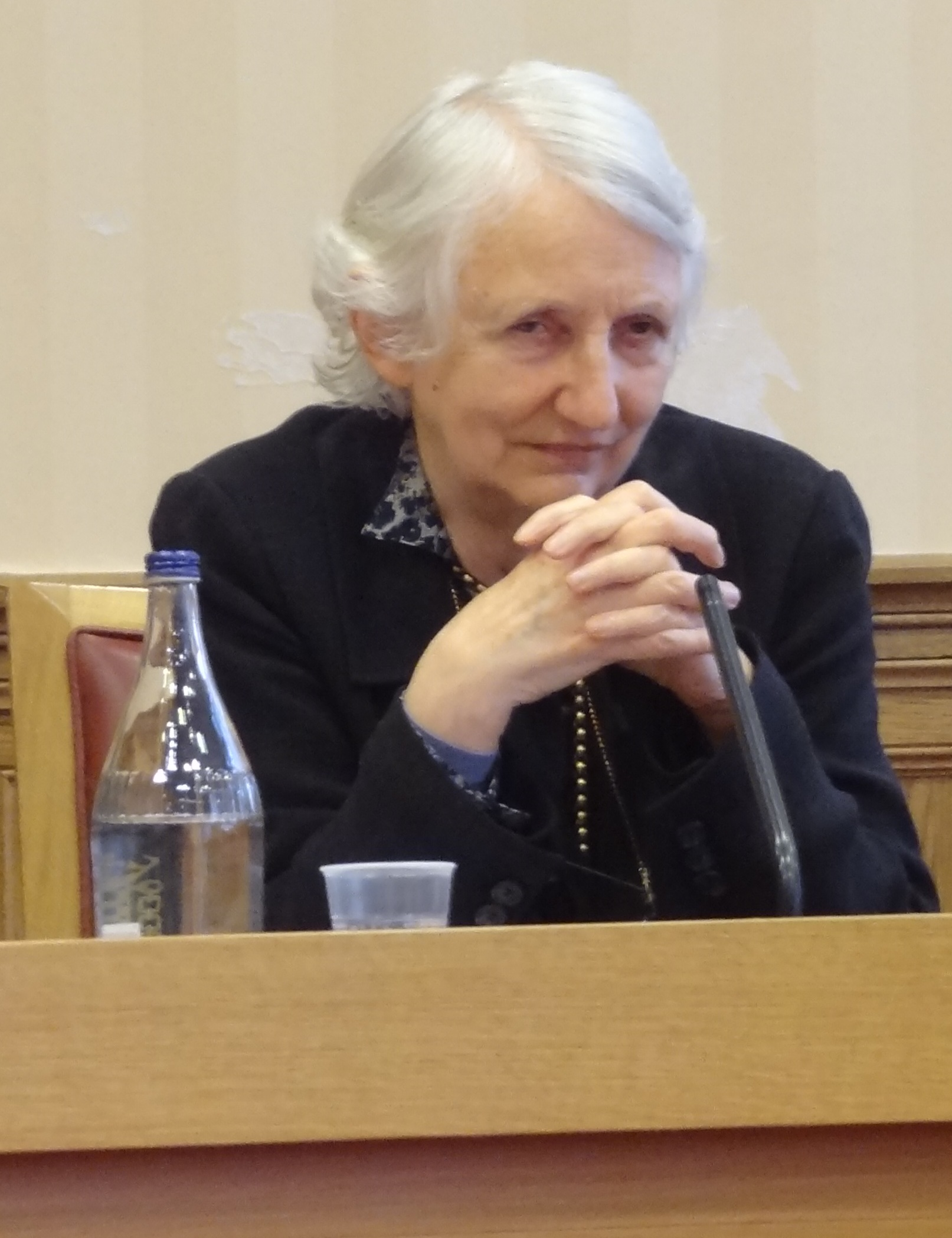
Onora O'Neill, Baroness O'Neill of Bengarve

- Mary Bennett (1913–2005), academic and Principal of St Hilda's College, Oxford; daughter of H. A. L. Fisher and Lettice Fisher
- Dame Averil Cameron (1940-2026), professor emerita of Late Antique and Byzantine History; former Warden of Keble College, Oxford; second woman to receive the Kenyon Medal
- Elizabeth Millicent Chilver (1914–2014), Principal of Bedford College, London and Lady Margaret Hall, Oxford
- Barbara Craig (1915–2005), archaeologist, classicist; Principal of Somerville College
- Helen Darbishire (1881–1961), literary scholar and Principal of Somerville College
- Margery Fry (1874–1958), prison reformer; one of the first women to become a magistrate; Secretary of the Howard League for Penal Reform; Principal of Somerville College
- Grace Eleanor Hadow (1875–1940), author, principal of what would become St Anne's College, Oxford, and vice-chairman of the Women's Institute
- Dame Kathleen Kenyon (1906–1978), leading archaeologist of Neolithic culture in the Fertile Crescent, best known for her excavations of Jericho; has been called one of the most influential archaeologists of the 20th century; refined the Wheeler-Kenyon method; Principal of St Hugh's College, Oxford
- Julia de Lacy Mann (1891–1985), economic historian and Principal of St Hilda's College, Oxford
- Onora O'Neill, Baroness O'Neill of Bengarve (1941), philosopher; first female winner of the Berggruen Prize; crossbench member of the House of Lords; Principal of Newnham College, Cambridge
- Daphne Park, Baroness Park of Monmouth (1921–2010), spy, clandestine senior controller in MI6; Principal of Somerville College
- Dame Emily Penrose (1858–1942), Principal of Royal Holloway College, Bedford College and Somerville College; first woman to gain a First in Greats (Classics) at Oxford
- Alice Prochaska (1947), former archivist and librarian; Principal of Somerville College
- Evelyn Procter (1897–1980), historian and academic; Principal of St Hugh's College, Oxford; first female scholar to be admitted to the National Historical Archive of Spain and the Biblioteca Nacional de España
- Catherine Royle (1963), diplomat and ambassador; Principal of Somerville College
- Dame Lucy Sutherland (1903–1980), Australian-born historian and head of Lady Margaret Hall, Oxford
- Dame Janet Vaughan (1899–1993), physiologist, academic and Principal of Somerville College; one of the first doctors to enter Bergen-Belsen concentration camp after the liberation
- Dame Anne Warburton (1927–2015), diplomat; first female British ambassador; President of Lucy Cavendish College, Cambridge

=== Fictional ===
- Gwen Stacy from Spider-Man went to Somerville to study medicine in The Amazing Spider-Man 2.
- Harriet Vane (Note: Undergraduate at Shrewsbury College, based on Dorothy L. Sayers' own Somerville College.) from Gaudy Night, studied English. Undergraduate at Shrewsbury College, based on Dorothy L. Sayers' own Somerville College.
- The wife of Master Keaton studied mathematics.
- Mary, Marie, Margaret and Myfanwy (Note: "St Bride's" is recognisably based on Somerville College.) from Larkin's Michaelmas Term at St Bride's
- Grace Ritchie, the protagonist in Slave of the Passion by Deirdre Wilson
- Helena Warner from A Likeness in Stone by Julia Wallis Martin, was a student of Somerville.

=== Film and theatre ===
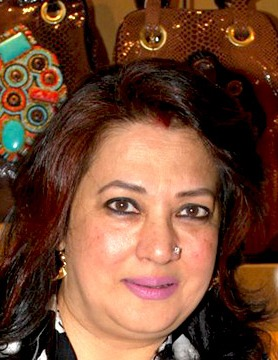
Moon Moon Sen

- Daphne Alexander, Cypriot/British actress best known for playing Nadia Talianos in the BBC Drama series Casualty and Modesty Blaise in three BBC radio adaptations
- Lucinda Coxon (1962), playwright and screenwriter
- Lucienne Hill (1923–2012), French-English translator and actor; winner of the Evening Standard Theatre Award and Tony Award
- Penelope Houston (1927–2015), film critic and journal editor; edited Sight & Sound for almost 35 years
- Calam Lynch (1994), actor of Irish descent, his films include the Disney adaptation of Black Beauty (2020) and Terence Davies' Benediction (2021); on television, he appeared in the BBC One drama Mrs Wilson (2018) and the second season of the Netflix series Bridgerton (2022)
- Adrian Politowski (1978), a BAFTA-nominated Swedish film producer, fund manager, and entrepreneur
- Martin Desmond Roe, British-American film and television director, writer and producer, best known for Buzkashi Boys (nominated for an Oscar); nominee for the Oscar for Best Live Action Short Film for Two Distant Strangers (2020) at the 93rd Academy Awards
- Tessa Ross (1961), film producer and executive; received the BAFTA Outstanding British Contribution to Cinema Award and was named as one of the 100 most powerful women in the United Kingdom by Woman's Hour in 2013; executive producer of 12 Years a Slave, 127 Hours, Billy Elliot and Ex Machina
- Moon Moon Sen (1954), Indian Bollywood film actress; winner of the Nandi Award for Best Supporting Actress and Kalakar Award for Best Actress

=== Health professionals ===
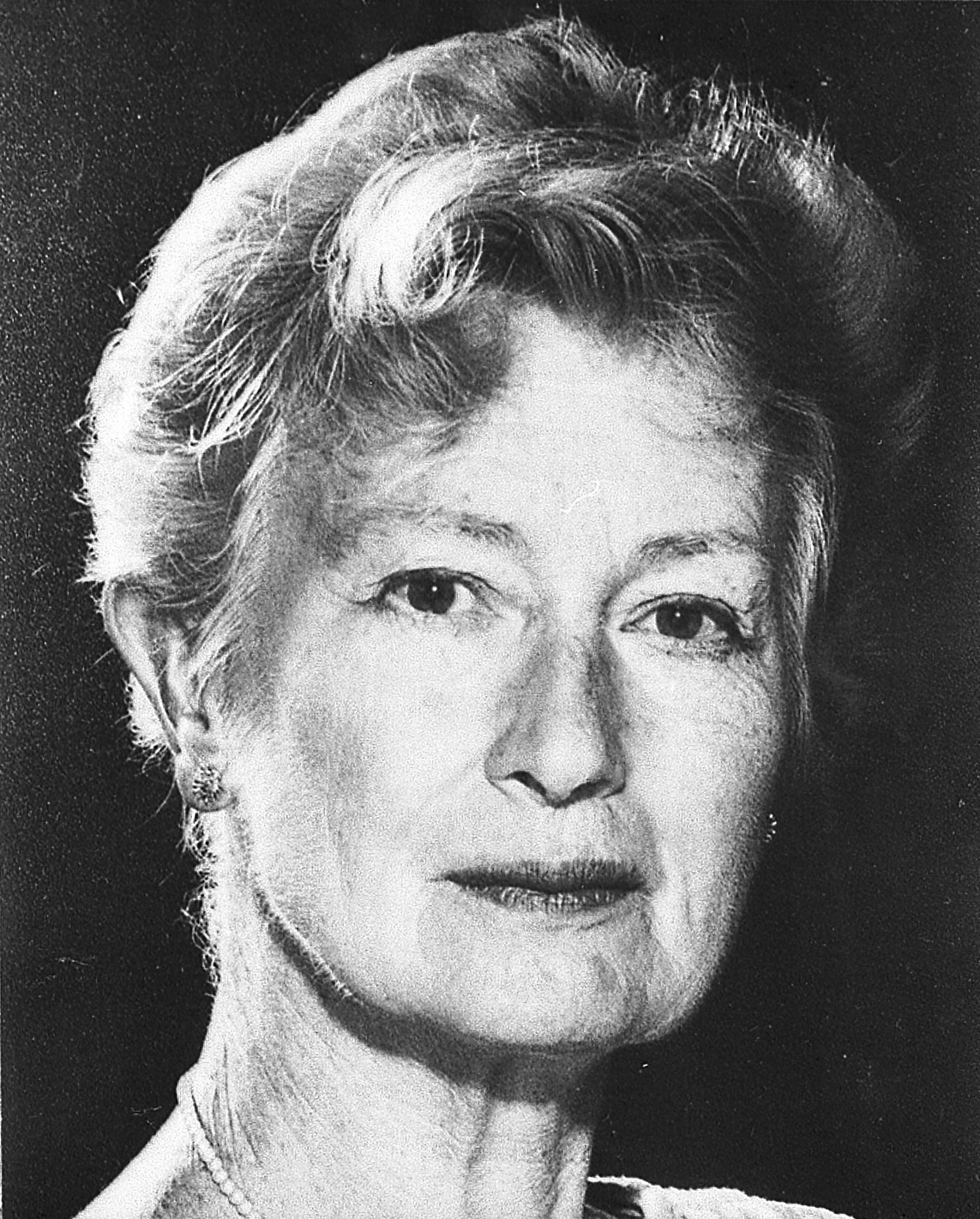
Helen Muir

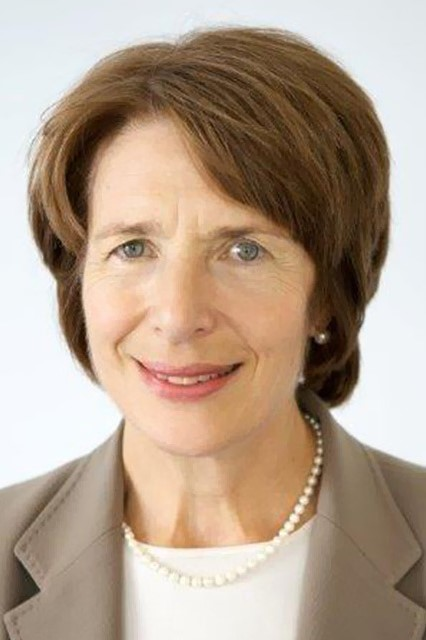
June Raine

- Kathryn Abel, psychiatrist specialising clinically in resistant schizophrenia and gender-specified service developments; co-chair of the Office for Life Sciences
- Margery Abrahams (1896-1983), dietitian who helped organise the Kindertransport scheme to rescue children from the Holocaust; first chairperson of the British Dietetic Association
- Heather Ashton (1929–2019), psychopharmacologist and physician best known for her clinical and research work on benzodiazepene dependence
- Carys Bannister (1935–2010), first female neurosurgeon in the United Kingdom
- Farah Bhatti, cardiac surgeon and professor; Chair of the Royal College of Surgeons of England Women in Surgery Forum; first British woman of Pakistani origins to be made a cardiac surgeon in the United Kingdom
- Lady Eileen Crofton (1919–2010), physician and author; best known for her anti-smoking campaigns
- Ann Dally (1926–2007), author and psychiatrist; one of the first women to study medicine at St Thomas' Hospital
- Jean Ginsburg (1926–2004), physician and physiologist; first woman to graduate from St Mary's Hospital Medical School
- Sylvia Gyde (1936-2024), public health doctor, medical researcher and National Health Service administrator
- Kamila Hawthorne MBE, Welsh medical academic and GP; twice named ‘GP of the Year’
- Christine Lee, medical researcher; first female scholar of the Oxford University Medical School
- Leah Lowenstein (1930–1984), American nephrologist and academic administrator; first woman dean of a co-education medical school in the United States
- Dorothea Maude (1879–1959), physician and surgeon; first woman general practitioner in Oxford
- Helen Muir (1920–2005), rheumatologist; best known for pioneering work into the causes of osteoarthritis
- June Raine (1952), Chief Executive of the Medicines and Healthcare products Regulatory Agency (MHRA), at the time when the MHRA was the first regulator to approve an mRNA vaccine for use in humans, and the first Western regulator to approve a COVID-19 vaccine
- Dame Janet Vaughan (1899–1993), physiologist, academic and Principal of Somerville College; one of the first doctors to enter Bergen-Belsen concentration camp after the liberation
- Wisia Wedzicha, physician and Professor of Respiratory Medicine, winner of the Helmholtz International Fellow Award
- Marcia Wilkinson (1919–2013), neurologist; made a significant contribution to the understanding and surgical treatment of carpal tunnel syndrome; established a rehabilitation unit for disabled young people; first recipient of the Elizabeth Garrett Anderson Award
- Maggie Eisner (1947–2022), British general practitioner
- Cicely Williams (1893–1992), Jamaican physician, most notable for her discovery and research into kwashiorkor

=== Journalism ===
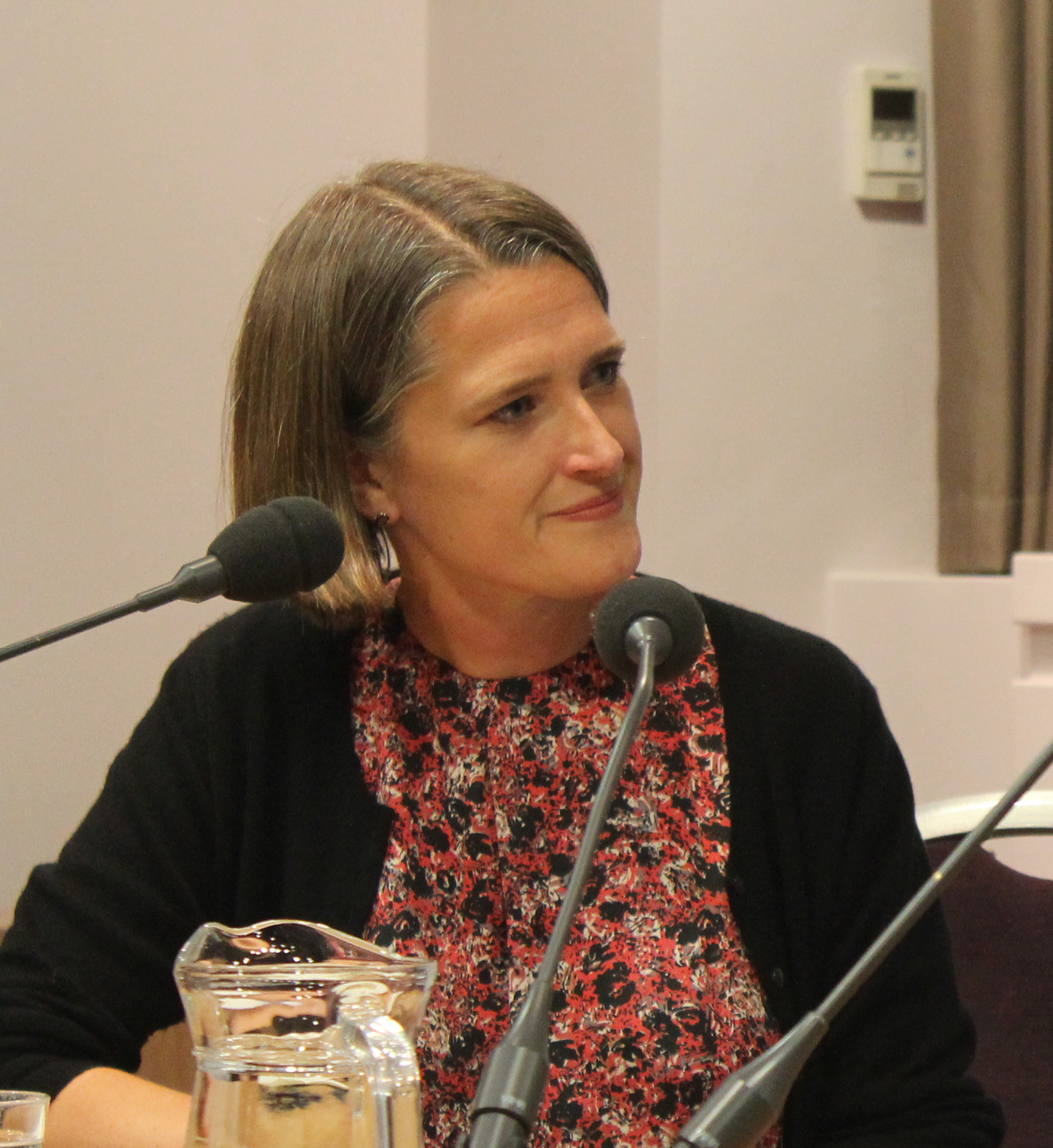
Rachel Sylvester

- Rose George, journalist and author of The Big Necessity
- Evelyn Irons (1900–2000), Scottish journalist, first female war correspondent to be decorated with the French Croix de Guerre; first journalist to reach certain WWII war zones; first female Stanhope Medal recipient
- Marghanita Laski (1915–1988), journalist, radio panellist and novelist
- Ty McCormick, American author, editor, and foreign correspondent
- Dilys Powell (1901–1995), journalist who wrote for The Sunday Times
- Anne Scott-James, Lady Lancaster (1913–2009), journalist and author; one of Britain's first women career journalists, editors and columnists
- Alexander Starritt (1985), Scottish-German novelist, journalist and entrepreneur
- Rachel Sylvester (1969), political journalist who writes for The Times; 2015's Political Journalist of the Year at the British Press Awards and 2016 Journalist of the Year by the Political Studies Association
- Daniel Tudor, author, journalist and entrepreneur
- Duncan Weldon (1982), journalist, former political advisor, researcher, and market strategist
- Kati Whitaker, BBC and independent radio and TV journalist
- Audrey Withers (1905–2001), journalist; edited Vogue

=== Historians ===
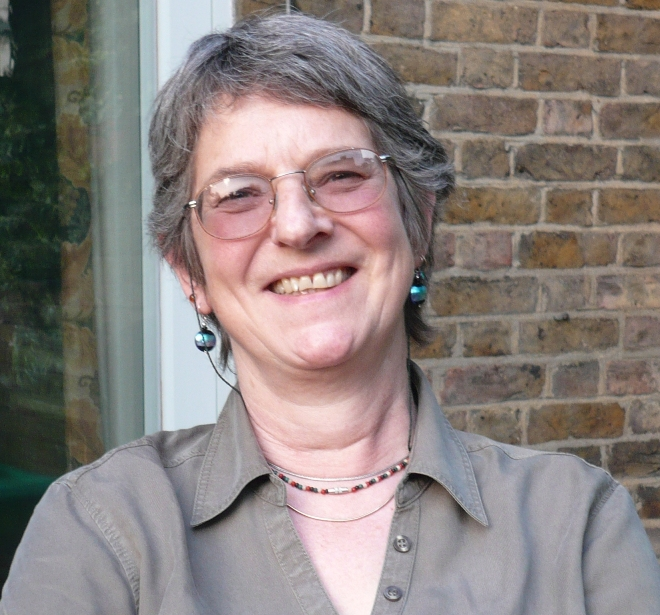
Jane Caplan

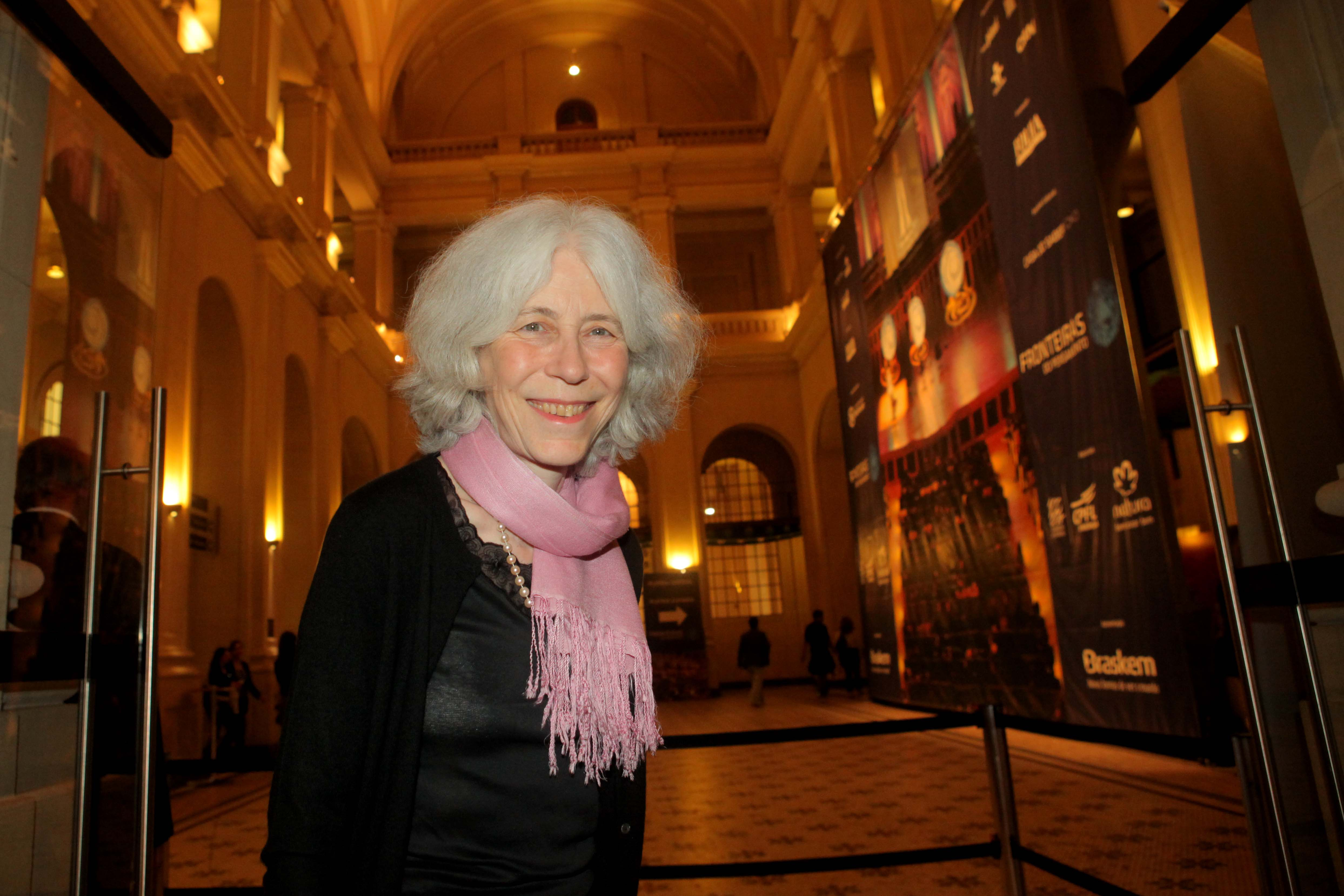
Emma Rothschild

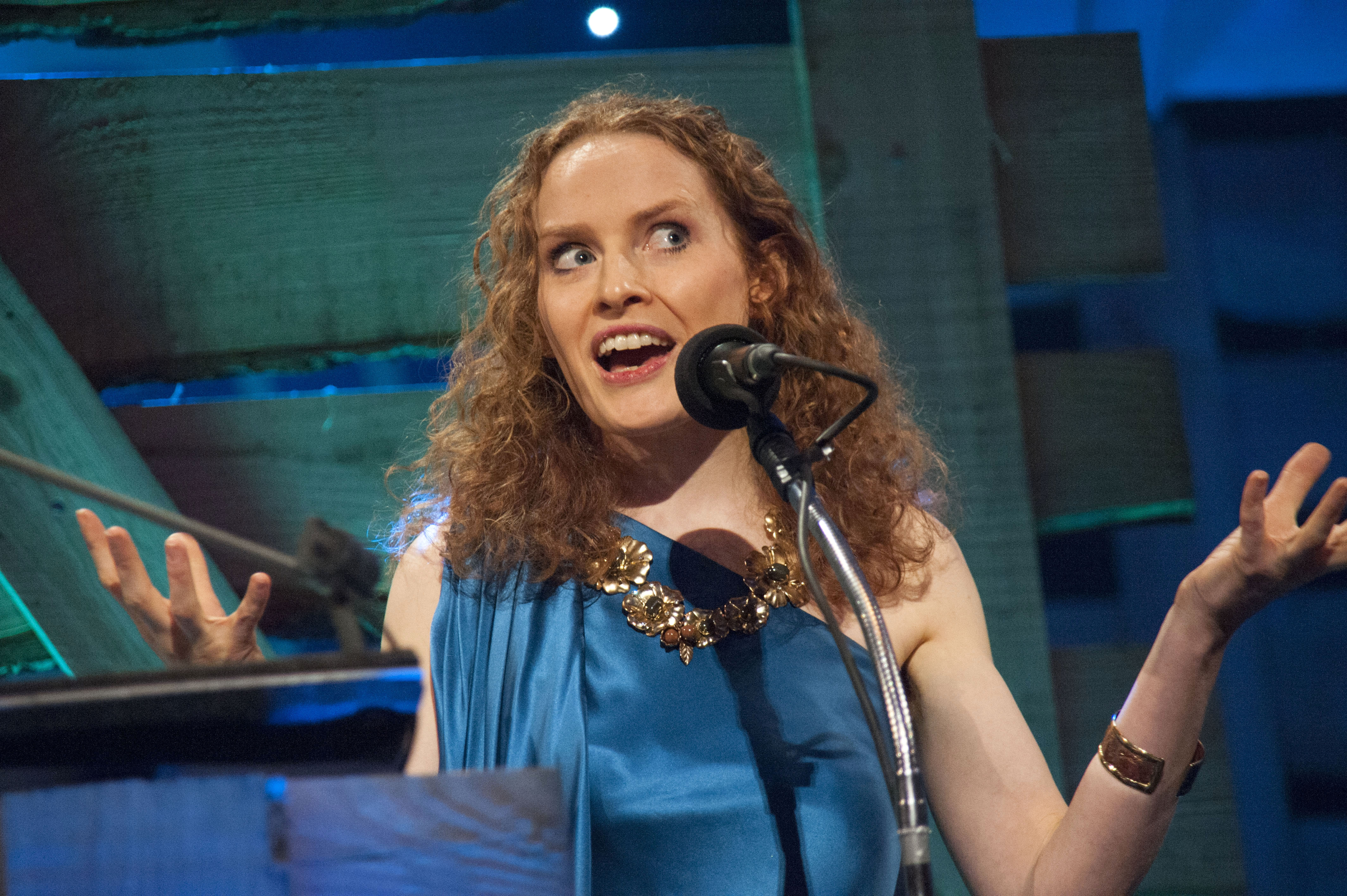
Kate Williams

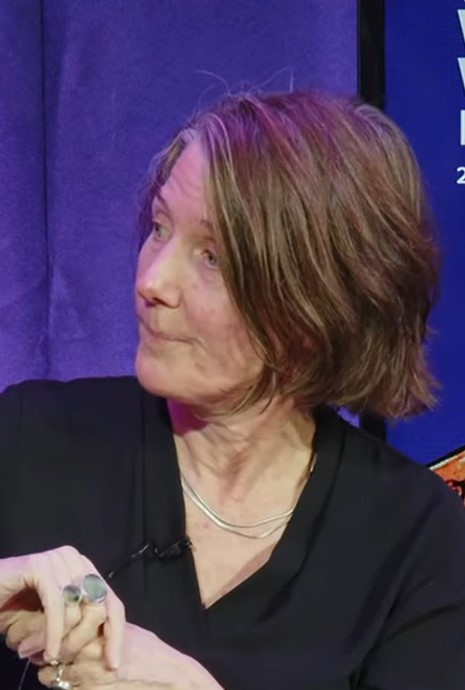
Clair Wills

- Bolanle Awe (1933), Nigerian and Yoruba history professor; became the Pro-Chancellor of the University of Nigeria and has been called a Nigerian "intellectual hero"; first female academic staff in a Nigerian university and first chairperson of the National Commission for Women (Nigeria)
- Irena Backus, Polish historian
- Jane Caplan (1945), historian specialising in Nazi Germany and the history of the documentation of individual identity; helped establish one of Britain's first courses in Women's Studies
- Muriel St. Clare Byrne (1895–1983), historical researcher, specializing in the Tudor period and the reign of Henry VIII
- Catherine Glyn Davies (1926–2007), Welsh historian of philosophy and linguistics; translator
- Claire Donovan (1948–2019), historian and academic
- Bonnie Effros, Chaddock Chair of Economic and Social History at the University of Liverpool
- Dorothea Ewart (1870-1956), historian and author of books on Italian history
- Kathleen Fitzpatrick (1905–1990), Australian academic and historian; first associate professor in Australia outside the natural sciences
- Eluned Garmon Jones (1897–1979), Welsh local historian
- Rose Graham (1875–1963), religious historian and first female President of the British Archaeological Association; her early work on ecclesiastical history is seen as a great foundation for later scholarship on women's history
- Alice Greenwood (1862–1935), historian, teacher and writer; second headteacher of Withington Girls' School
- Narayani Gupta (1942), Indian historian, author, and professor on urban history and cultural heritage
- Agnes Headlam-Morley (1902–1986), historian and academic; first woman to be appointed to a chair at Oxford
- Carole Hillenbrand (1943), Emerita Professor in Islamic History; first non-Muslim to be awarded the King Faisal International Prize for Islamic Studies
- Philippa Mary Hoskin, historian of the English Middle Ages, who specializes in the religious, legal and administrative history of the English Church; first Professor of Medieval Studies at the University of Lincoln
- M. D. R. Leys (1890–1967), historian and academic
- Amy Audrey Locke (1881-1916), historian
- Doris Ketelbey (1896–1990), historian and academic; sister to composer Albert Ketelbey
- Amélie Kuhrt (1944-2023), historian and specialist in the history of the ancient Near East
- Julia de Lacy Mann (1891–1985), economic historian and Principal of St Hilda's College, Oxford
- Margaret Mann Phillips (1906–1987), academic who specialized in Renaissance literature and history
- Phoebe Pool (1913–1971), art historian and spy for the Soviet Union
- Edna Purdie (1894-1968), Emeritus Professor of German studies at the University of London
- Mary Caroline Moorman (1905–1994), historian and biographer; daughter of G. M. Trevelyan; winner of the James Tait Black Memorial Prize
- Jane Robinson (1959), social historian specialising in the study of women pioneers in various fields
- Emma Georgina Rothschild (1948), economic historian and professor of history at Harvard University; wife of Nobel laureate Amartya Sen; member of the Rothschild family
- Zuzanna Shonfield (1919–2000), Polish-born British historian and writer
- Nancy Stepan, focuses on the history of science in Latin America
- Kate Williams (1978), author, historian and television presenter
- Clair Wills, academic specialising in 20th-century British and Irish cultural history and literature; recipient of the Hessell-Tiltman Prize
- Mary Woodall (1901–1988), art historian, museum director, and Thomas Gainsborough scholar

==== Classicists and archaeologists ====
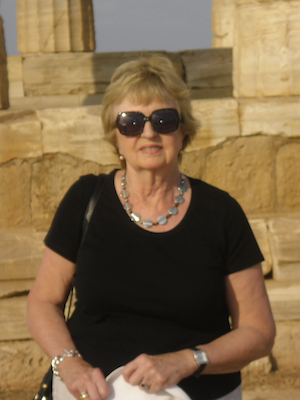
Averil Cameron

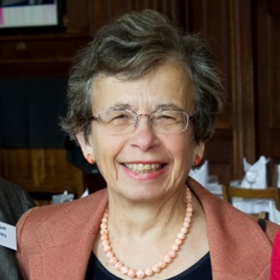
Miriam T. Griffin

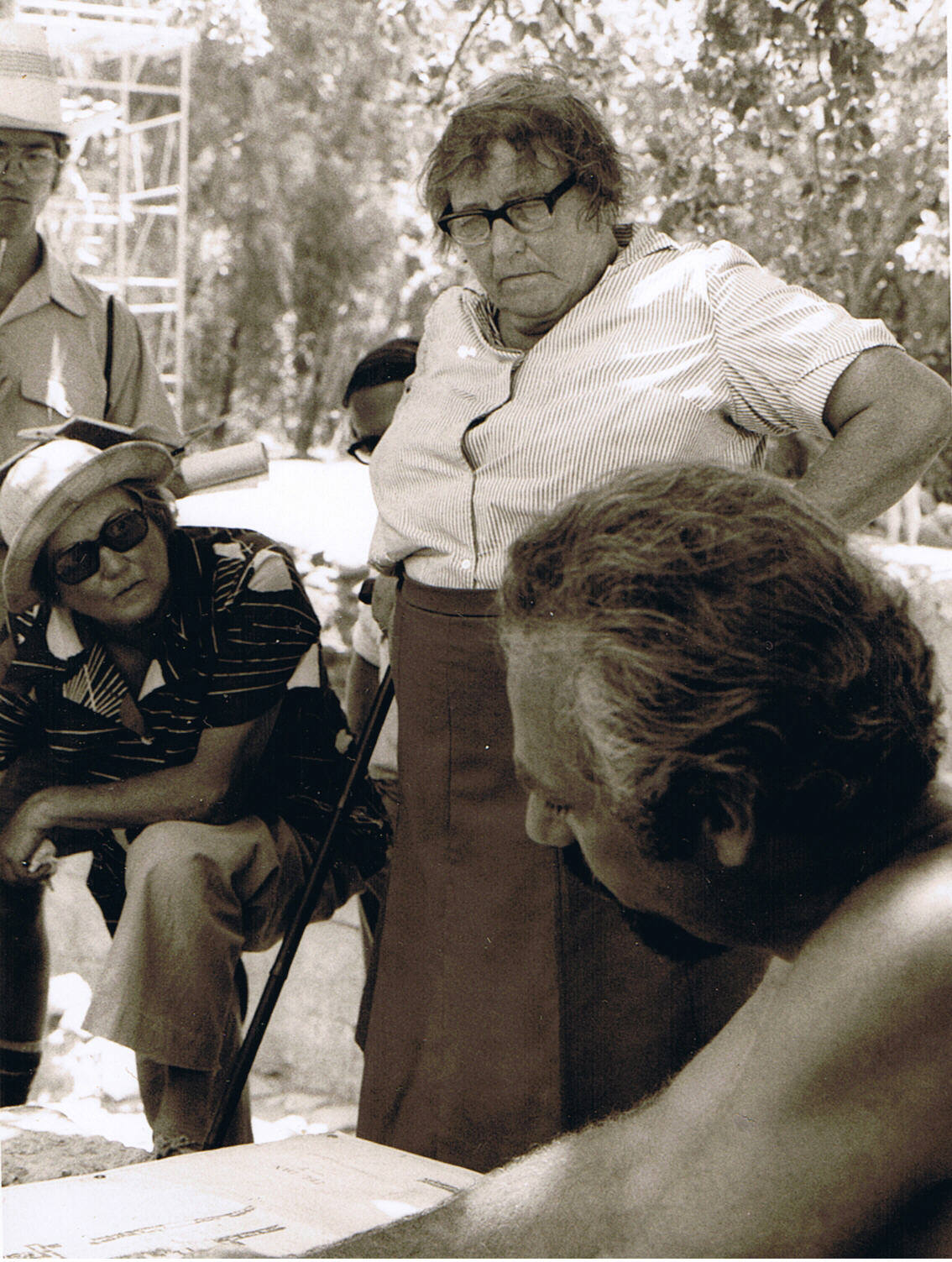
Kathleen Kenyon

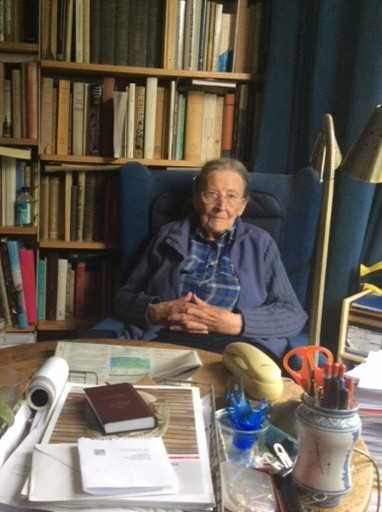
Joyce Reynolds

- Caroline Alexander (1956), American author and classicist; first woman to publish a full-length English translation of Homer's Iliad
- Polymnia Athanassiadi, Greek Professor Emerita in Late Antique History
- Winifred Blackman (1872–1950), pioneering Egyptologist, archaeologist and anthropologist; one of the first women to take up anthropology as a profession
- Dame Averil Cameron (1940), professor emerita of Late Antique and Byzantine History; former Warden of Keble College, Oxford; second woman to receive the Kenyon Medal
- Dorothy Charlesworth (1927–1981), Roman archaeologist and glass specialist; served as Inspector of Ancient Monuments
- Gillian Clark, Emeritus Professor of Classics and Ancient History
- Barbara Craig (1915–2005), archaeologist, classicist; Principal of Somerville College
- A. M. Dale (1901–1967), classicist and academic
- Claudine Dauphin (1950), French archaeologist specialising in the Byzantine period
- Elaine Fantham (1933–2016), British-Canadian classicist; President of the American Philological Association
- Dorothea Gray (1905-1983), classicist known for her advocacy of pre-classical Greek archaeology
- Miriam T. Griffin (1935–2018), American classical scholar; held the first Women in Classics dinner (at Somerville College)
- Jill Harries, Emeritus Professor in Ancient History, known for her work on late antiquity
- Isobel Henderson (1906–1967), ancient historian; one of the first woman tutors to be allowed to join Oxford's 'Ancient History Dinners'
- Mary A.B. Herford, early female lecturer in Classical Archaeology at the University of Manchester
- Margaret Hobling (1897-1977), archaeologist and Quaker theologian
- Margaret Hubbard (1924–2011), Australian-born British classical scholar specialising in philology; described as "one of the most distinguished classical scholars of the modern age"; one of St Anne's College's 15 founding fellows
- Helen Hughes-Brock (1938), Minoan and Mycenaean archaeologist
- Sarah C. Humphreys, classical scholar
- Dame Kathleen Kenyon (1906–1978), leading archaeologist of Neolithic culture in the Fertile Crescent, best known for her excavations of Jericho; has been called one of the most influential archaeologists of the 20th century; refined the Wheeler-Kenyon method; Principal of St Hugh's College, Oxford
- Donna Carol Kurtz (1943), American classicist specializing in Greek art; first Beazley Archivist at the Ashmolean Museum
- Maria Millington Lathbury (1856-1944), classical scholar, archaeologist and numismatist; mother-in-law of Arthur Evans
- Irene Lemos, classical archaeologist specialising in the Late Bronze Age and Early Iron Age of Greece
- Tessa Rajak (1946), ancient historian, primarily focused on Judaism in the Hellenistic and Roman periods; expert on the writings of Josephus
- Joyce Reynolds (1918–2022), classicist and academic, specialising in Roman historical epigraphy; first woman awarded the Kenyon Medal
- Christina Riggs, American historian, museum curator, and academic; specialises in the history of archaeology, photography, and ancient Egyptian art
- Katherine Routledge (1866–1935), archaeologist and anthropologist who initiated the first true survey of Easter Island (leader of the Mana Expedition)
- Susan Sherratt (1949), archaeologist of Bronze Age Greece, Cyprus, and the eastern Mediterranean
- Maria Stamatopoulou, Greek classical archaeologist specialising in Central Greece, and Thessaly in particular
- Margerie Venables Taylor (1881–1963), archaeologist and editor of the Journal of Roman Studies; held posts including Secretary for the Society for the Promotion of Roman Studies
- Vivian Wade-Gery (1897–1988), classical archaeologist
- Audrey Williams (1902–1978), Welsh archaeologist; first woman president of the Royal Institution of South Wales
- Katharine Woolley (1888–1945), archaeologist who worked principally at the Mesopotamian site of Ur; married to archaeologist Sir Leonard Woolley; inspiration for the murder victim in the novel Murder in Mesopotamia by Agatha Christie
- Maria Wyke (1957), professor of Latin at UCL

==== Medievalists ====
- Caroline Barron (1940), medieval historian; granddaughter of David George Hogarth
- Margaret Clunies Ross (1942), medievalist; main research areas are Old Norse-Icelandic studies
- Ursula Dronke (1920–2012), medievalist and former Vigfússon Reader in Old Norse in Oxford
- Antonia Gransden (1928/29–2020), historian and medievalist
- Judith Green (1961), medieval historian, specialising in Anglo-Norman England
- Elspeth Kennedy (1921–2006), academic, prominent medievalist
- Clare Kirchberger, Anglican nun and medievalist who edited and translated several works of Christian mysticism
- May McKisack (1900–1981), medieval historian
- Mildred Pope (1872–1956), scholar of Anglo-Norman England; first woman to hold a readership at Oxford University; the character Miss Lydgate in Sayers' Gaudy Night (1935) is based on Pope
- Evelyn Procter (1897–1980), historian and academic; served as principal of St Hugh's College, Oxford; first female scholar to be admitted to the National Historical Archive of Spain and the Biblioteca Nacional de España
- Margaret Twycross, historian specialising in medieval theatre and iconography
- Teresa Webber, palaeographer and medievalist

=== Law ===
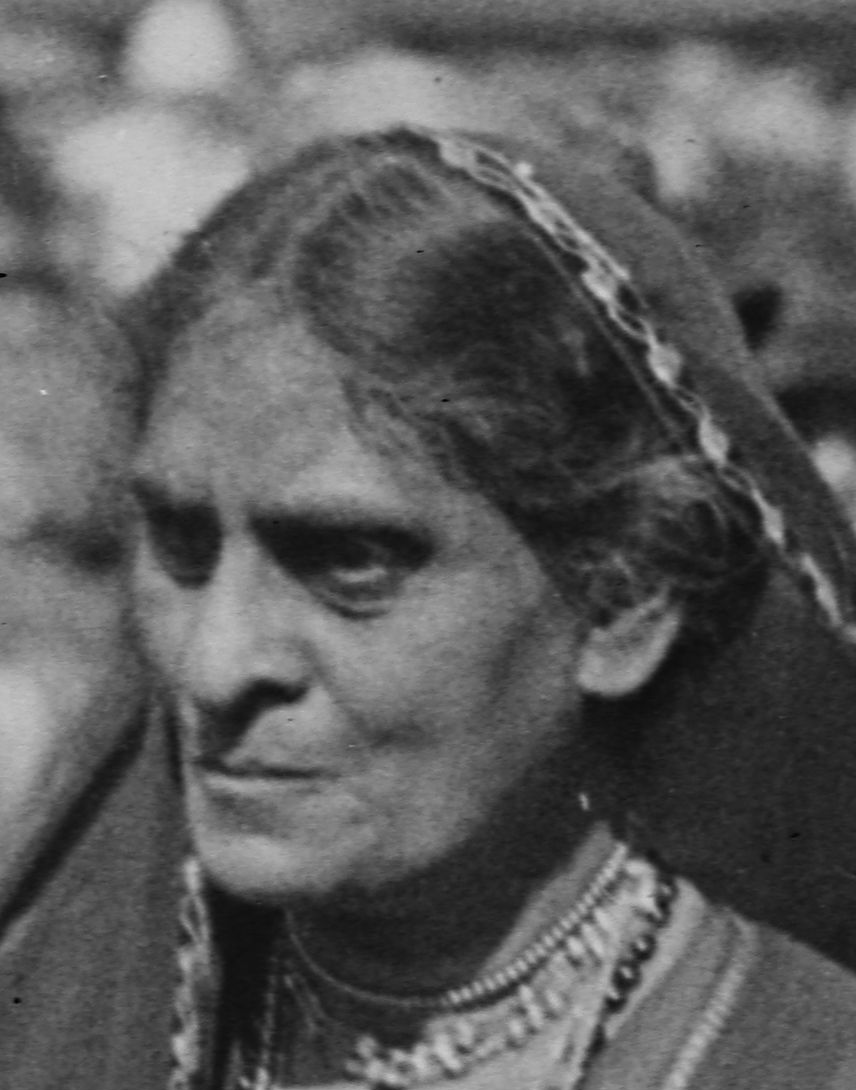
Cornelia Sorabji

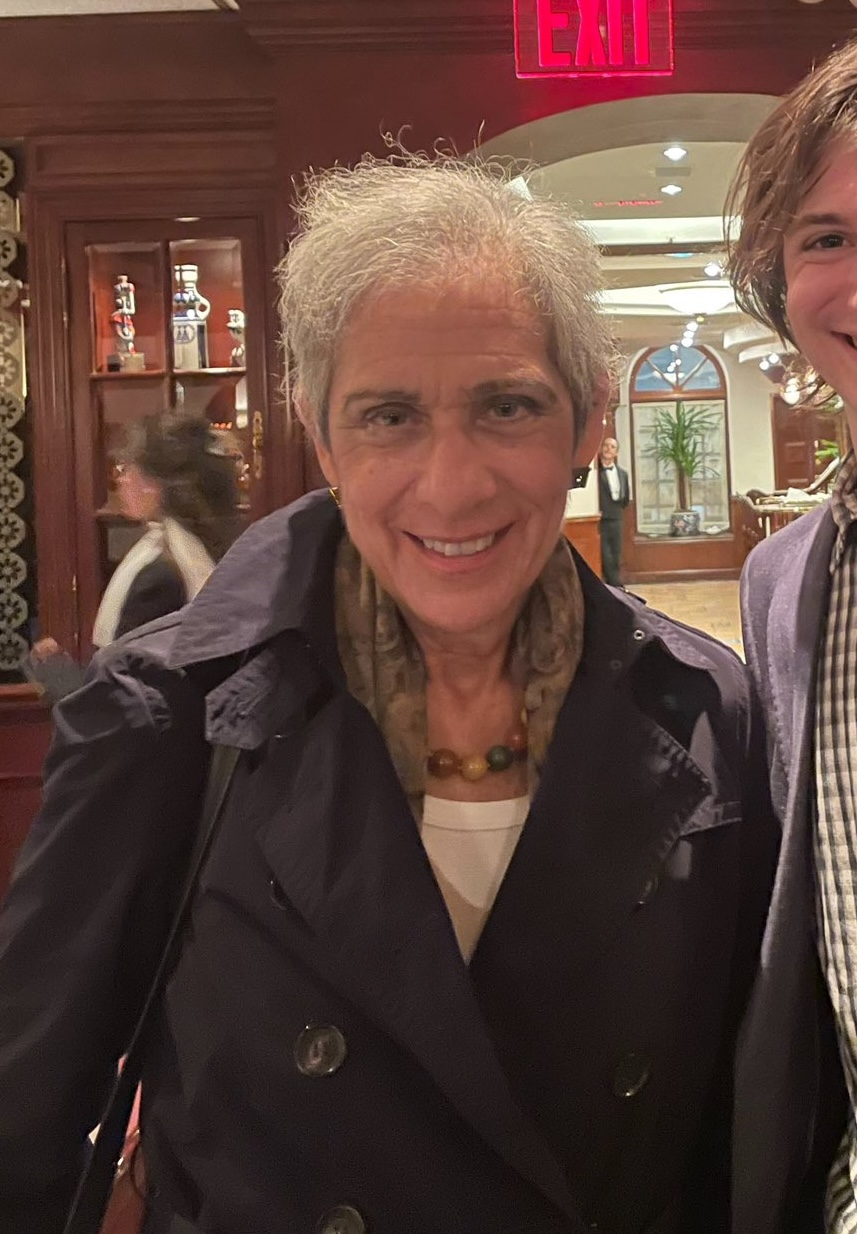
Amy Wax

- Margaret Casely-Hayford (1959), lawyer and businesswoman; chair of the board of Shakespeare's Globe; former chair of ActionAid
- Lady Fox (1928-2025), international lawyer and expert in state immunity
- Elisabeth Jones, Welsh lawyer who served as the Counsel General-designate for Wales
- Laeticia Kikonyogo (1940–2017), Ugandan lawyer and judge; rated the 6th most powerful person in Ugandan public life; first woman magistrate Grade I; first woman Chief Magistrate; first woman to be appointed High Court judge; first woman Deputy Chief Justice of Uganda; one of the first ever women papal knights in the history of the Catholic Church in Africa
- Akua Kuenyehia (1947), Ghanaian lawyer; one of the only three female African judges at the International Criminal Court; first First Vice-president of that court
- Nemone Lethbridge (1932), barrister and playwright; one of Britain's first female barristers and the first woman at Hare Court
- Anne M. Lofaso (1965), law professor
- Elizabeth Monk (1898-1980), Canadian lawyer and Montreal city councillor; one of the first two women admitted to the Quebec Bar and first Quebec woman to receive a Queen's Counsel designation; recipient of the Governor General's Award in Commemoration of the Persons Case and Governor General's Academic Medal
- Ann Olivarius (1955), American-British lawyer and Rhodes Scholar
- Dame Judith Parker (1950), judge and barrister; Queen's Counsel and Justice of the High Court of England and Wales
- Anna Poole, Lady Poole, Senator of the College of Justice in Scotland
- Cornelia Sorabji (1866–1954), first woman to practice law in India and Britain; first Indian national to study at any British university
- Amy Wax (1953), American lawyer and academic; winner of the Lindback Award
- Farhana Yamin (1965), lawyer, public speaker and climate activist

=== Linguistics and literature ===
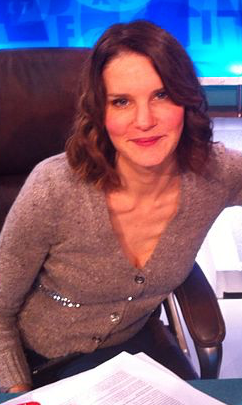
Susie Dent

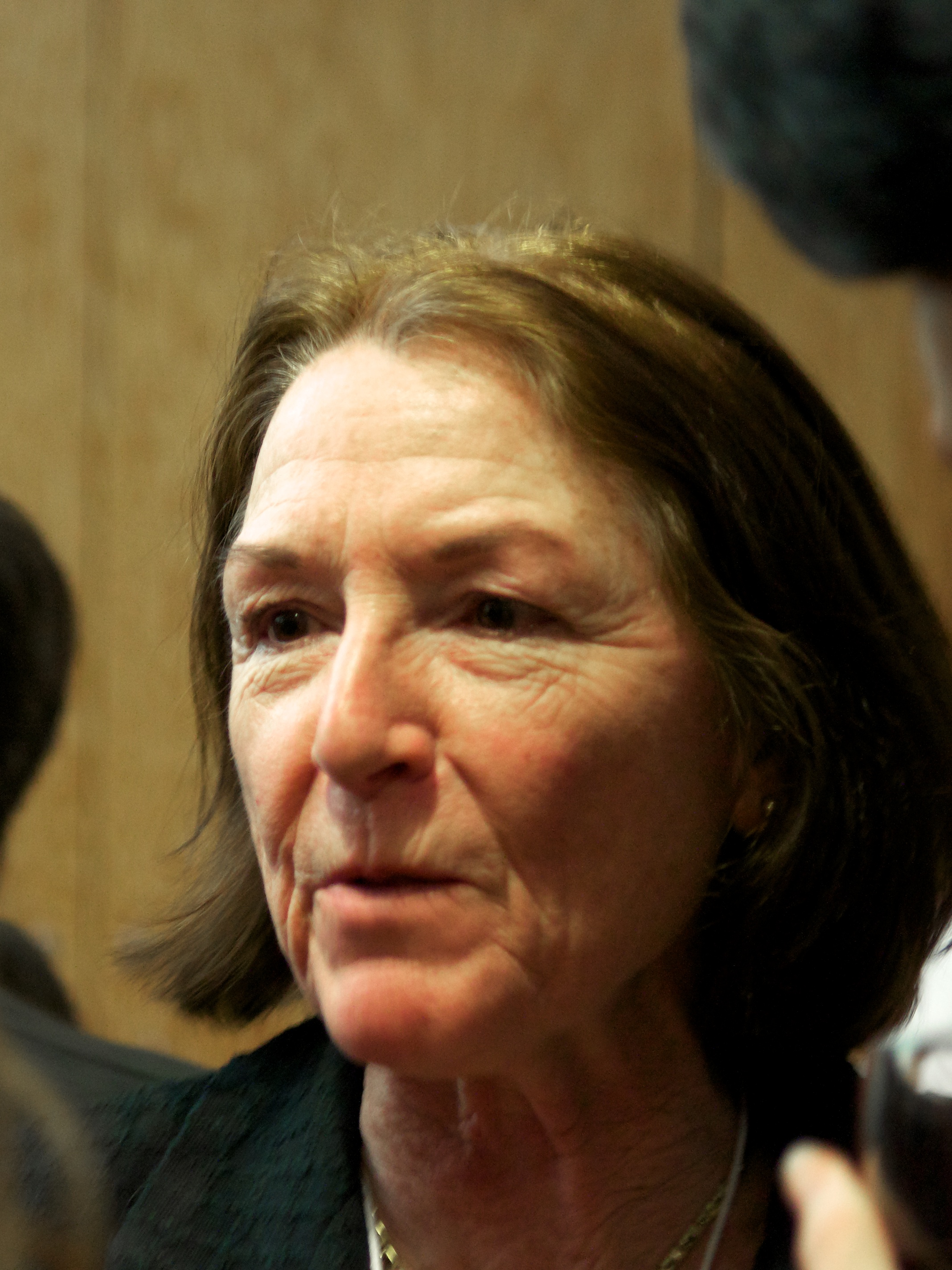
Janet Dean Fodor

- Reem Bassiouney (1973), Egyptian author and professor of sociolinguistics; Sawiris Cultural Award winner
- Janet Bately, academic and Professor Emeritus of English Language and Medieval Literature
- Catherine Belsey (1940–2021), literary critic and academic; author of The Subject of Tragedy
- Sonia Bićanić (1920–2017), literary academic, author and translator
- Sarah Bilston, author and professor of English literature
- Carmen Blacker (1924–2009), scholar of Japanese language
- Margaret Crum (1921-1986), scholar of English poetry and music, winner of the British Academy's Rose Mary Crawshay Prize
- Lady Norma Dalrymple-Champneys (1902–1997), scholar of English literature; winner of the Rose Mary Crawshay Prize
- Patricia Davies (1923), codebreaker who served as a special duties linguist in the Women’s Royal Naval Service during World War II; she was key in developing programmes such as University Challenge, The Sky at Night, and Ask the Family; recipient of the Victory Medal and the Legion of Honour
- Susie Dent (1964), lexicographer and etymologist; has appeared in "Dictionary Corner" on the Channel 4 game show Countdown since 1992
- Una Ellis-Fermor (1894–1958), literary critic, author; described as "a major contributor to the study of the English Renaissance"; Rose Mary Crawshay Prize winner
- Margery Fisher (1913–1992), literary critic and academic
- Janet Dean Fodor (1942–2023), psycholinguist
- Julia Gasper, independent academic specialising in historical literature; right-wing political activist affiliated with the English Democrats
- Sybil Goulding (fl. 1914–1931), literary critic and academic
- Lorna Hutson (1958), ninth Merton Professor of English Literature
- Agnes Latham (1905–1996), academic, Professor of English at Bedford College
- Dominica Legge (1905–1986), scholar of the Anglo-Norman language and founding member of the Anglo-Norman Text Society
- Anna Laura Lepschy (1933), Italian linguist; recipient of the Serena Medal
- Joycelynne Loncke, Guyanese academic and musicologist; areas of interest include French literature and the history of music
- Margaret Mann Phillips (1906–1987), academic who specialized in Renaissance literature and history
- Edith Morley OBE (1875–1964), literary scholar, activist and suffragette; first female professor in Britain
- Vivien Noakes (1937–2011), biographer, editor and critic
- Pamela Neville-Sington (1959-2017), American literary biographer and authority on the life and works of Fanny Trollope, Anthony Trollope, and Robert Browning
- Helen Peters (1942), Canadian scholar of English literature and a specialist in the theatre of Newfoundland; winner of the British Academy's Rose Mary Crawshay Prize
- Rebecca Posner (1929–2018), philologist, linguist and academic; specialized in Romance languages; President of the Philological Society
- Phoebe Sheavyn (1865-1968), literary scholar and feminist; a professor at Victoria University of Manchester and founding member of the British Federation of University Women
- Dorjana Širola (1972), Croatian quizzer, linguist and anglicist; highest placed woman at the World Quizzing Championship in seven years; winner of University Challenge for Somerville
- Emma Smith, Professor of Shakespeare Studies
- Enid Starkie (1897–1970), Irish literary critic known for her biographical works on French poets; Officer of the Legion of Honour
- Kathleen Mary Tillotson (1906–2001), academic and literary critic, professor of English and distinguished Victorian scholar
- Joan Turville-Petre (1911–2006), noted academic in the field of Anglo-Saxon, Icelandic and Scandinavian language studies
- Rosemond Tuve (1903–1964), American scholar of English literature, specializing in Renaissance literature, in particular Edmund Spenser
- Kathleen Mary Williams (1919-1974), Welsh literary scholar
- David Willis, linguist and Celticist; Jesus Professor of Celtic at the University of Oxford
- Deirdre Wilson (1941), linguist and cognitive scientist

=== Music ===
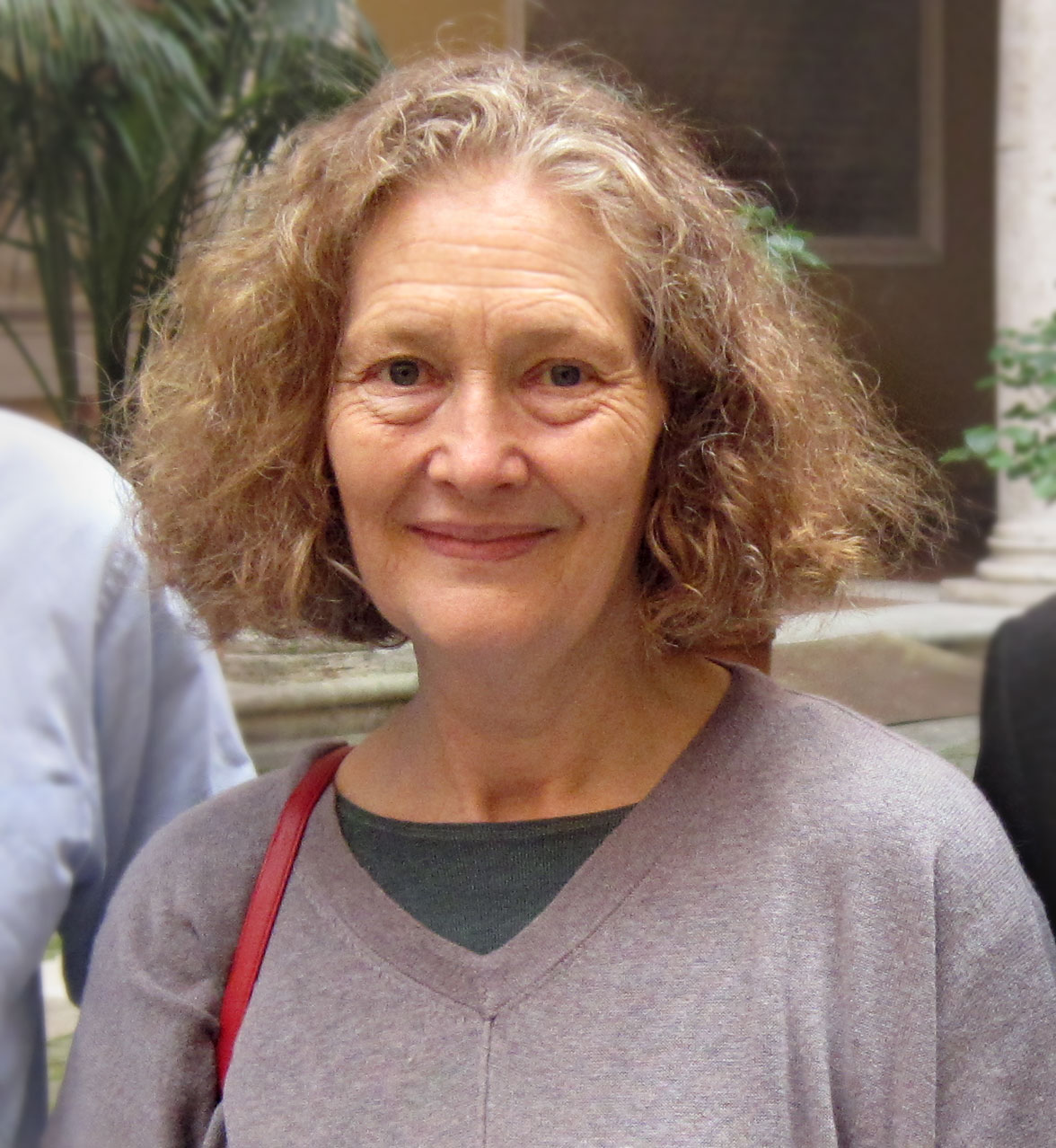
Emma Kirkby

- Mary Chandler (1911-1996), composer, oboist, pianist and teacher.
- Harry Escott (1976), composer
- Sarah Ioannides (1972), Greek Cypriot-Scottish-Australian conductor and Fulbright Scholar
- Dame Emma Kirkby (1949), soprano; one of the world's most renowned early music specialists; The Queen's Medal for Music winner
- Joycelynne Loncke, Guyanese academic and musicologist; areas of interest include French literature and the history of music
- Grace-Evangeline Mason (1994), composer of contemporary classical music
- Elizabeth Norman McKay (1931–2018), musicologist, pianist and Lieder accompanist
- Jean Redcliffe-Maud, Baroness Redcliffe-Maude (1904–1993), pianist

=== Other ===
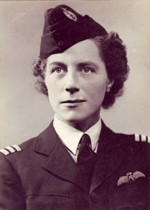
Marion Wilberforce

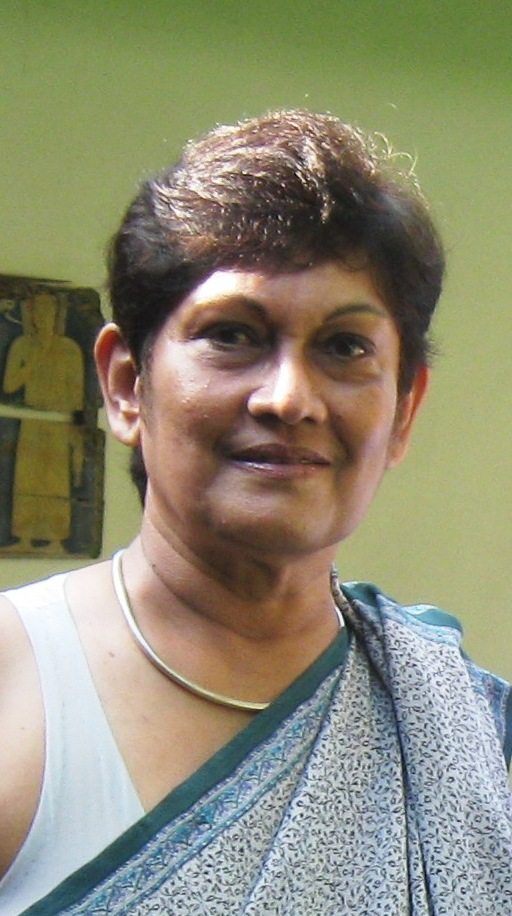
Sunethra Bandaranaike

- Sunethra Bandaranaike (1943), Sri Lankan philanthropist and socialite; daughter of Prime Minister S. W. R. D. Bandaranaike
- Sheila Cassidy (1937), doctor and torture survivor who brought to the attention of the UK public the widespread human rights abuses that were occurring in Chile in the 1970s
- Eleanor Flexner (1908–1995), distinguished independent scholar and pioneer in what was to become the field of women's studies
- Flora Grierson (1899–1966), publisher and co-owner of Samson Press
- Amanda Harlech, Baroness Harlech (1959), fashion consultant; named to the International Best Dressed List Hall of Fame; wife of Francis Ormsby-Gore, 6th Baron Harlech
- Emily Georgiana Kemp (1860–1939), adventurer; donated the Somerville College Chapel
- Frances Lincoln (1945–2001), independent publisher of illustrated books; won a Woman of the Year award in 1995
- Sheila Lochhead (1910-1994), hostess, prison visitor and writer; daughter of UK Prime Minister Ramsay MacDonald; chair of the National Association of Official Prison Visitors
- Henrietta Phipps (1931–2016), landscape gardener
- Helge Rubinstein, founder of Ben's Cookies
- Joan Shelmerdine (1899–1994), publisher and co-owner of Samson Press
- Edith Standen (1905–1998), American museum curator and military officer; one of the "Monuments Men"; Women's Caucus for Art Lifetime Achievement Award winner
- Janet Upcott (1888-1985) social worker specialising in housing management
- Pamela Vandyke-Price (1923–2014), wine taster and writer; first British woman to write about wine and spirits; receiver of the Order of Agricultural Merit
- Joan Wicken (1925-2004), personal assistant and speechwriter to Tanzanian president Julius Nyerere
- Marion Wilberforce (1902–1995), Scottish aviator; one of the first eight members of the Air Transport Auxiliary; one of only two women pool commanders in the whole ATA
- Beryl de Zoete (1879–1962), ballet dancer, orientalist, dance critic and dance researcher; also known as a translator of Italo Svevo and Alberto Moravia

=== Philosophers ===
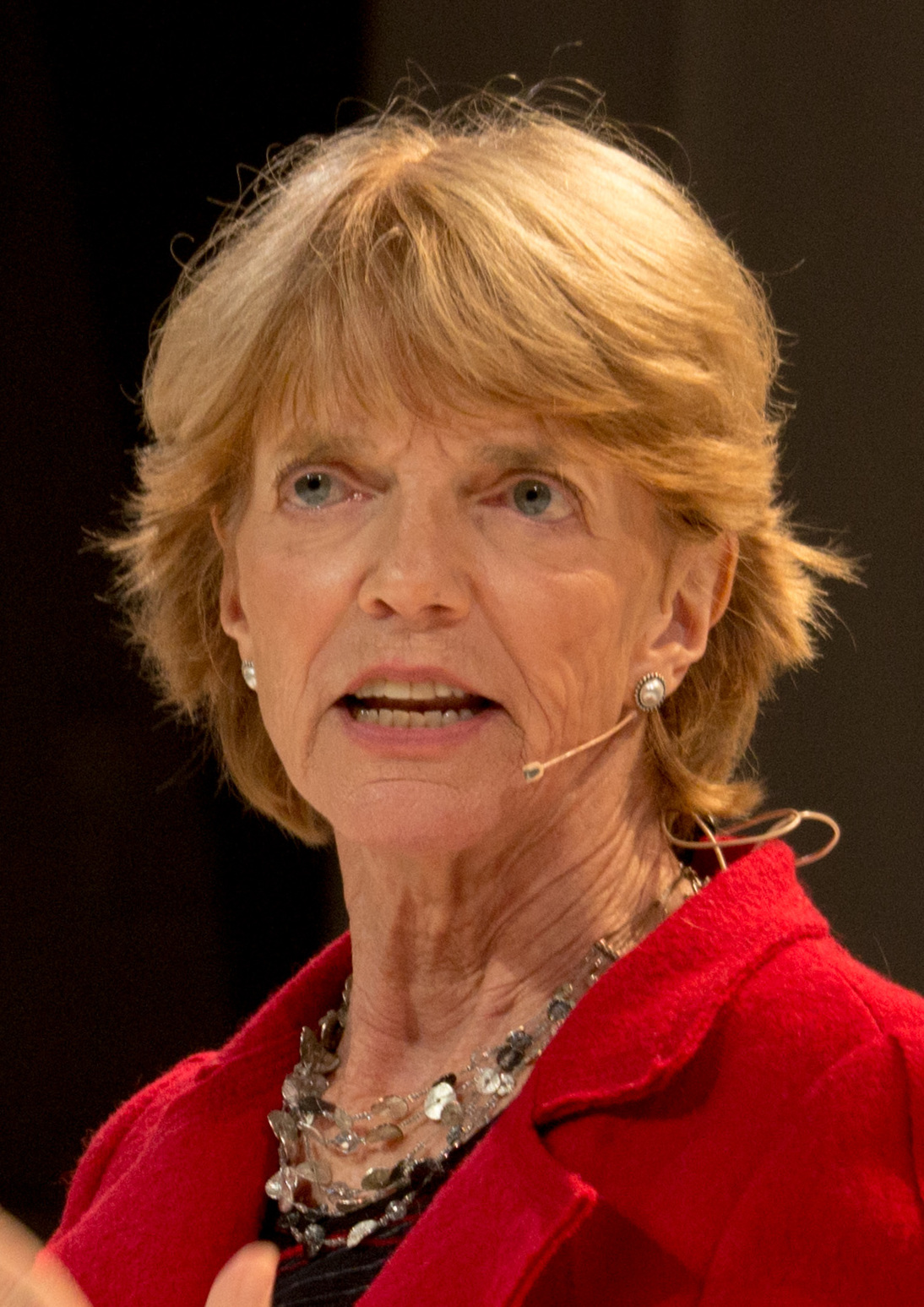
Patricia Churchland

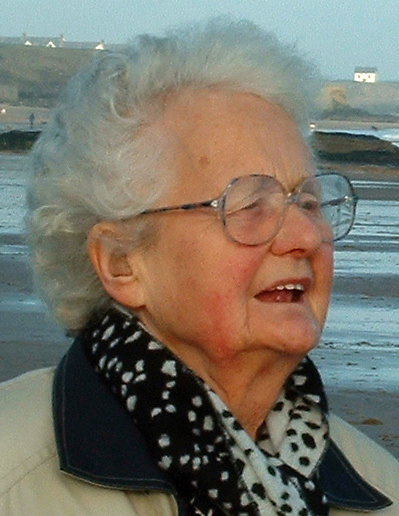
Mary Midgley

- Anita Avramides (1952), philosopher whose work focuses on the philosophy of language and the philosophy of the mind
- Annette Baier (1929–2012), New Zealand philosopher and Hume scholar; well known also for her contributions to feminist philosophy and to the philosophy of mind
- Susanne Bobzien, German-born philosopher whose work focuses on logic & language, determinism & freedom, and ancient philosophy; first woman appointed a tutorial fellow at The Queen's College, Oxford
- Sarah Broadie, professor at the University of St Andrews; specialises in ancient philosophy, with a particular emphasis on Aristotle and Plato
- Patricia Churchland (1943), Canadian-American analytic philosopher, noted for her contributions to neurophilosophy and the philosophy of mind; winner of a MacArthur Fellowship
- Philippa Foot (1920–2010), philosopher and ethicist, creator of the trolley problem
- Celia Green (1935), writer on philosophical skepticism and psychology
- Rosalind Hursthouse (1943), New Zealand moral philosopher noted for her work on virtue ethics
- Hidé Ishiguro (c. 1935), Japanese analytic philosopher; expert on the philosopher Gottfried Wilhelm Leibniz
- Martha Kneale (1909–2001), philosopher; President of the Aristotelian Society
- Genevieve Lloyd (1941), Australian philosopher and feminist; first female Professor of Philosophy in Australia; author of The Man of Reason
- Penelope Mackie, philosopher, Professor of Philosophy University of Nottingham work on modality and necessity
- Mary Midgley (1919–2018), moral philosopher
- Michele Moody-Adams, African-American philosopher; first female and first African-American dean of Columbia University
- Dame Iris Murdoch (1919–1999), novelist and philosopher born in Ireland; twelfth on a list of The 50 greatest British writers since 1945; winner of the Booker Prize; author of Under the Net, listed in the Modern Library 100 Best Novels
- Kathleen Nott (1905–1999), poet, novelist, critic, philosopher and editor
- Hilda D. Oakeley (1867–1950), philosopher, educationalist and author; first Warden of the new Royal Victoria College; first woman to deliver McGill's annual university lecture
- Susan Moller Okin (1946–2004), New Zealand liberal feminist political philosopher and author
- Onora O'Neill, Baroness O'Neill of Bengarve (1941), philosopher; first female winner of the Berggruen Prize; crossbench member of the House of Lords; Principal of Newnham College, Cambridge
- Eva Picardi (1948–2017), Italian philosopher
- Sybil Wolfram (1931-1993), philosopher and writer of German Jewish origin, mother of Stephen Wolfram

=== Politicians ===
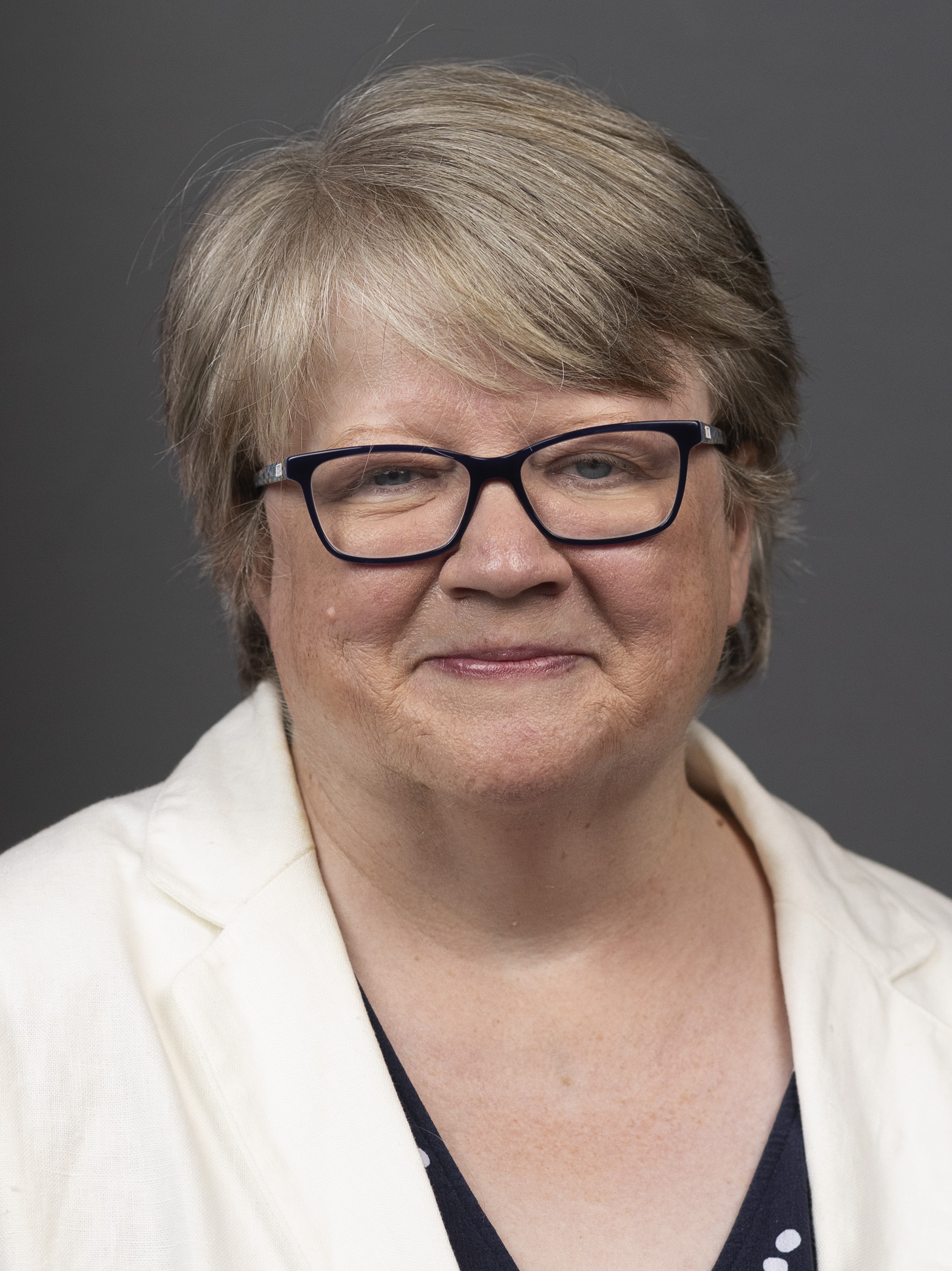
Thérèse Coffey

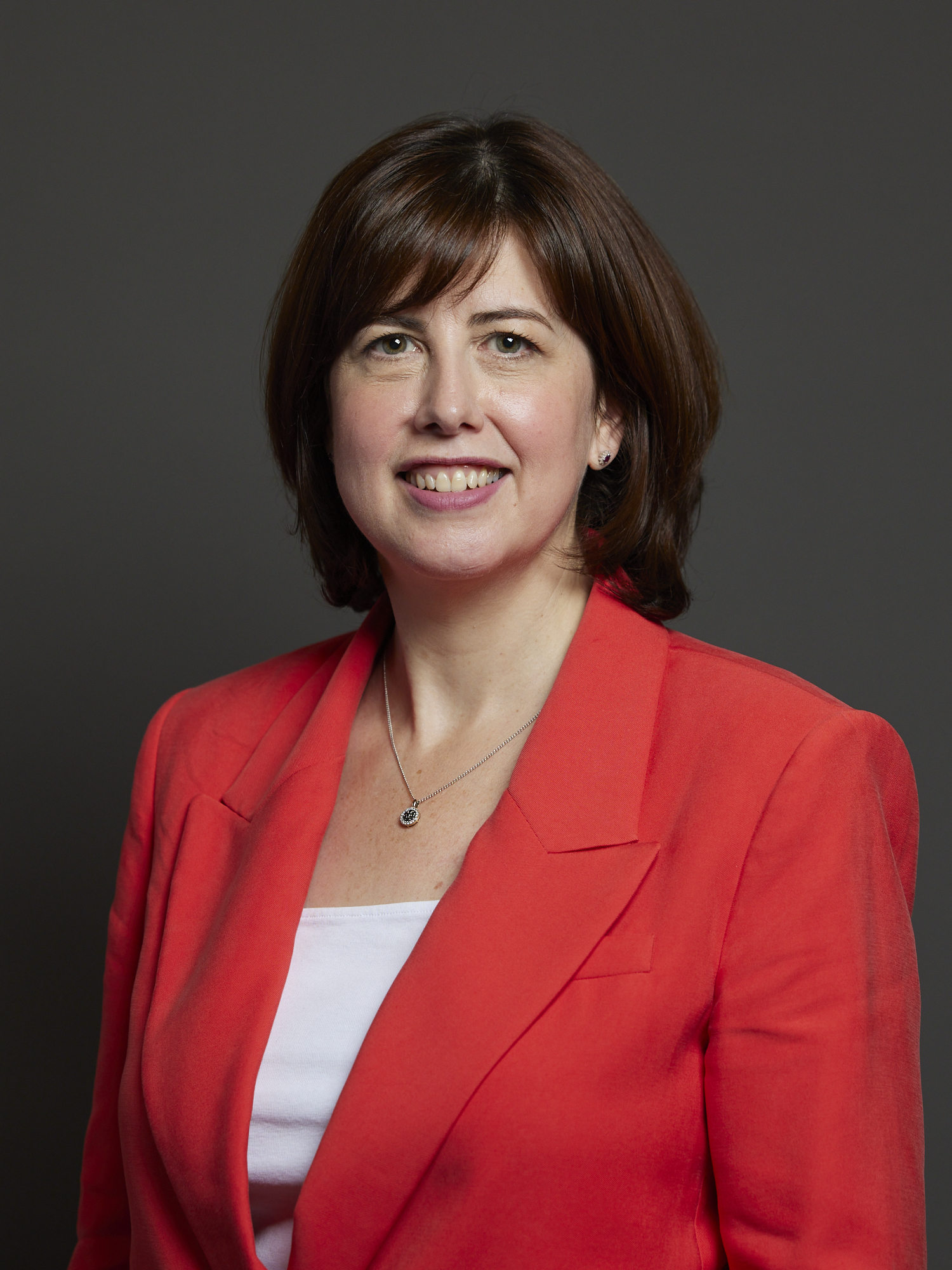
Lucy Powell

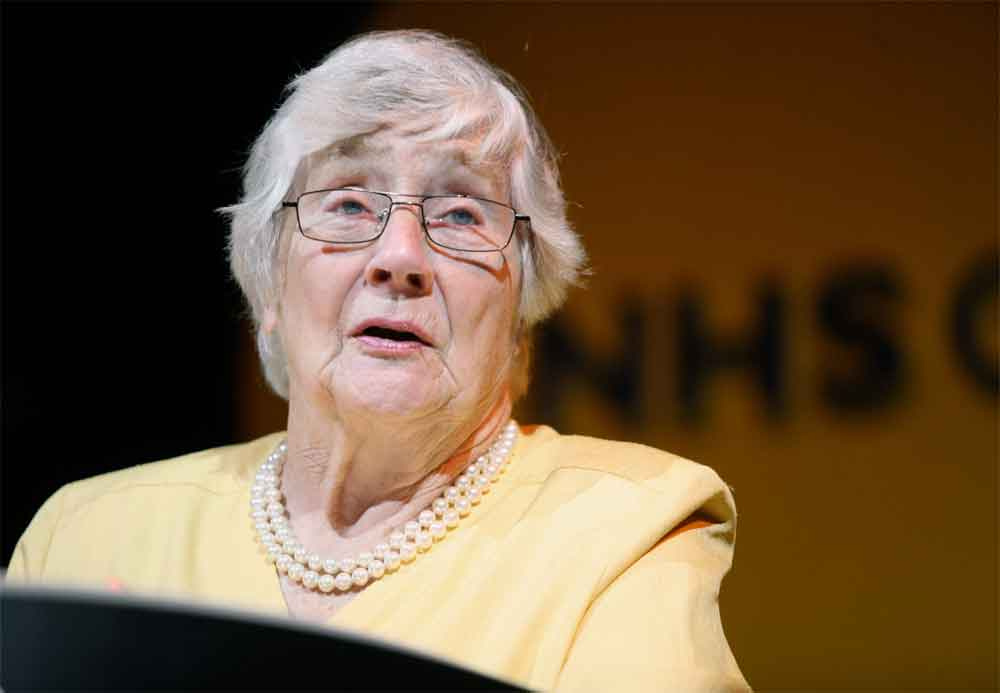
Shirley Williams, Baroness Williams of Crosby

- Elsbeth Dimsdale (1871–1949), health campaigner and Liberal politician; first woman to receive a college fellowship at the University of Cambridge; founder of the Royal Papworth Hospital
- Dame Penelope Jessel (1920–1996), Liberal Party politician
- Eleanor Rathbone (1872–1946), independent MP; long-term campaigner for family allowance and for women's rights; member of the Rathbone family and Somerville's first MP
- Shirley Williams, Baroness Williams of Crosby (1930-2021), politician and academic who represents the Liberal Democrats; one of the "Gang of Four" rebels who founded the Social Democratic Party (SDP)

==== Conservatives ====
- Nicola Blackwood, Baroness Blackwood of North Oxford (1979), Conservative Party politician, former MP
- Thérèse Coffey, Baroness Coffey (1971), former Conservative Party politician and MP; Deputy Prime Minister of the United Kingdom and Secretary of State for Health and Social Care
- Sam Gyimah MP (1976), Conservative Party politician; former Minister for Universities, Science, Research and Innovation
- Dame Lucy Neville-Rolfe, Baroness Neville-Rolfe (1953), Conservative politician; Chairman of Assured Food Standards
- Dame Kathleen Ollerenshaw (1912–2014), mathematician and politician; Lord Mayor of Manchester
- Margaret Thatcher, Baroness Thatcher (1925–2013), Iron Lady, Conservative politician and first female Prime Minister of the United Kingdom
- Lena Townsend (1911–2004), Conservative politician

==== Labour ====
- Helen Goodman (1958), Labour Party politician
- Nia Griffith (1956), Welsh Labour Party politician
- Mary Honeyball (1952), Member of the European Parliament (MEP) for the Labour Party representing London
- Margaret Jay, Baroness Jay of Paddington (1939), politician for the Labour Party; former BBC television producer and presenter; daughter of James Callaghan
- Peggy Jay (1913–2008), Labour councillor
- Leah L'Estrange Malone (1886–1951), politician; first female chair of Poale Zion in the UK
- Jenny Manson (1948), British Jewish activist, author, former civil servant, Labour Party councillor and Chair of Jewish Voice for Labour
- Mary O'Brien Harris (1865–1938), member of the London County Council and Fabian Society
- Lucy Powell (1974), Labour and Co-operative politician; Manchester's first female Labour member of parliament; Shadow Secretary of State for Housing
- Jake Richards (1989), MP for Rother Valley
- Anne Sofer (1937), Labour and later Social Democrat politician; also served as a director of Channel 4
- Theresa Stewart (1930-2020), Labour politician; first female leader of Birmingham City Council and Lord Mayor of Birmingham
- Shirley Summerskill (1931), Labour Party politician and former government minister
- Shriti Vadera, Baroness Vadera (1962), investment banker and politician; government minister and Chairwoman of Santander UK; first woman to head a major British bank; first woman and first person of colour to chair the Royal Shakespeare Company
- Eirene White, Baroness White MP (1909–1999), Labour politician and journalist

==== International ====
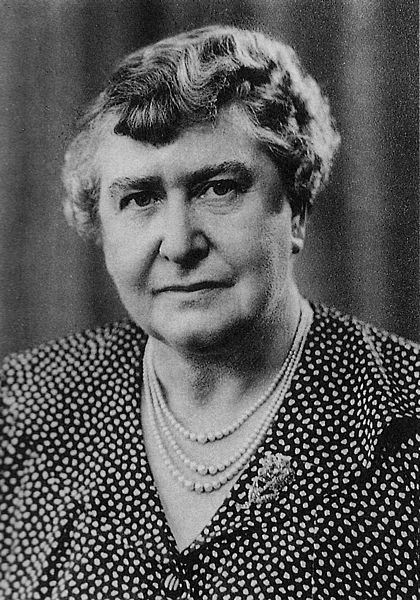
Margaret Ballinger

- Margaret Ballinger (1894–1980), South African politician, first President of the Liberal Party of South Africa, "Queen of the Blacks"; held considerable power in the government of South Africa
- Kalpana Bista (1905-2001), first female Minister of Education, Science and Technology of Nepal
- Indira Gandhi (1917–1984), Prime Minister of India, named "Woman of the Millennium" in an online poll organised by the BBC
- Svava Jakobsdóttir (1930–2004), one of Iceland's foremost 20th-century authors and feminist politicians
- Diana Josephson (1936-2006), first woman to lead the National Oceanic and Atmospheric Administration (NOAA) and first female Under Secretary of Commerce for Oceans and Atmosphere under Bill Clinton
- Catherine Mulholland (1940), former member of the New Hampshire House of Representatives
- Koila Nailatikau (1953), Fijian diplomat and politician; First Lady of Fiji from 2009 until 2015
- Adelaide Plumptre (1874–1948), Canadian activist, diplomat, and municipal politician in Toronto; first woman elected chair of the Canadian Red Cross, Toronto Board of Education; first woman to sit in the Toronto Board of Control
- Radhabai Subbarayan (1891–1960), first female member of the Indian Council of States (Rajya Sabha)
- Andrea Wechsler (1977), German professor and politician; elected member of the European Parliament in 2024

=== Psychology ===
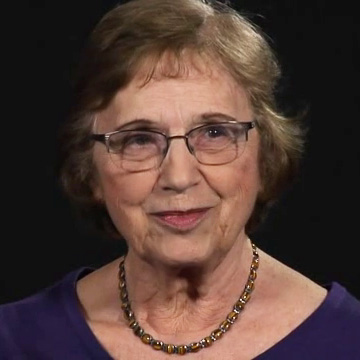
Anne Treisman

- Nina Coltart (1927–1997), psychoanalyst, psychotherapist, and essayist; Vice President of the British Psychoanalytical Society
- Janet Dean Fodor (1942-2023), psycholinguist
- Suzanne Higgs, psychologist and editor-in-chief of the journal Appetite
- Mary Sturt (1896-1993), educational psychologist and historian of education
- Barbara Tizard (1926–2015), psychologist and academic, specialising in developmental psychology
- Anne Treisman (1935–2018), psychologist who specialised in cognitive psychology; developed the feature integration theory and attenuation theory; awarded the National Medal of Science, Grawemeyer Award and first woman to receive the Golden Brain Award

=== Radio and television ===
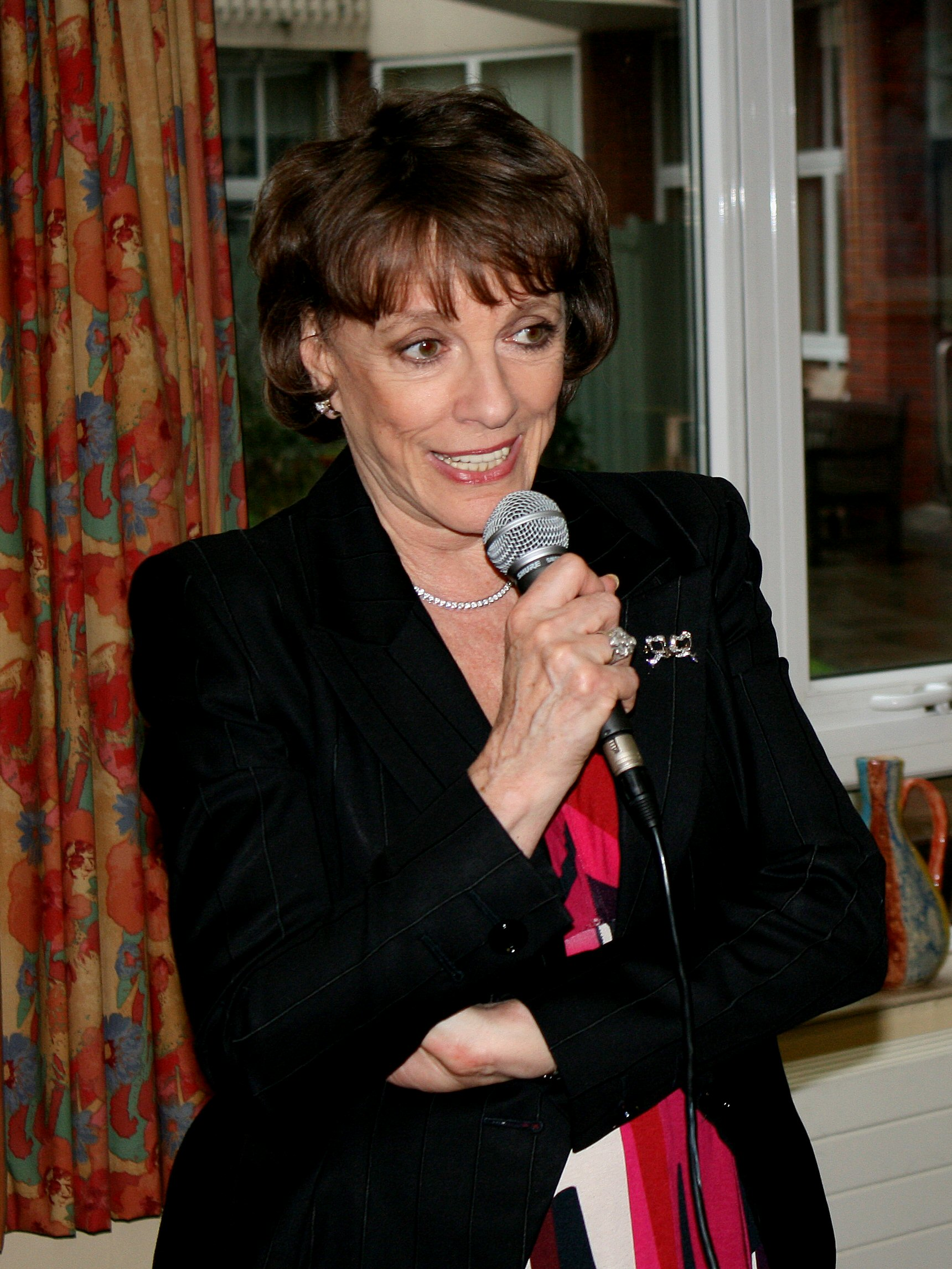
Esther Rantzen

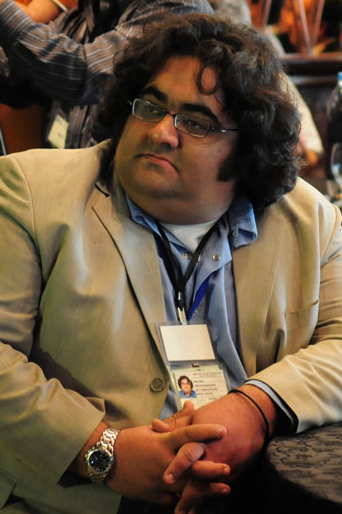
Fasi Zaka

- Dame Elan Closs Stephens (1948), Chair of the BBC (2023–2024); Welsh educator and pro-chancellor of Aberystwyth University
- Margaret Jay, Baroness Jay of Paddington (1939), politician for the Labour Party; former BBC television producer and presenter
- Kara Miller, Jamaican creator of The Lifestylista; health & wellness expert; television host; writer & director working in film and television
- Sarah Mulvey (1974–2010), commissioning editor and television producer
- Nesta Pain (1905-1995), broadcaster and writer
- Dame Esther Rantzen (1940), journalist and television presenter, best known for presenting the hit BBC television series That's Life!; first woman to receive a Dimbleby Award from BAFTA
- Mary Somerville (1897–1963), first director of BBC School Radio
- Joanna Spicer (1906–1992), television executive employed by the BBC; involved with discussions that lead to Civilisation and Doctor Who; "ran BBC Television single handed"
- Anne Symonds (1917–2017), broadcaster for the BBC World Service; grandmother-in-law of Boris Johnson
- Xand van Tulleken (1978), TV presenter with his identical twin brother Chris van Tulleken
- Rebecca Wilcox (1980), television presenter, mainly for the BBC
- Kate Williams (1978), author, historian and television presenter
- Grace Wyndham Goldie (1900–1986), producer and executive in British television
- Fasi Zaka (1974), Pakistani political commentator, columnist, radio talk show host, and television anchor; declared a Young Global Leader by the World Economic Forum

=== Religion ===
- Constance Coltman (1889–1969), Britain's first woman to be an ordained minister
- Margaret Hobling (1897-1977), archaeologist and Quaker theologian
- Peggy Jackson (1951), current and first female Archdeacon of Llandaff
- Constance Langdon-Davies (1898 – 1954), one of the early Baháʼís in Britain
- Christina Le Moignan (1942), Methodist minister and academic, who served as President of the Methodist Conference
- Janet Soskice (1951), Canadian-born Catholic theologian and philosopher; her work has dealt with the role of women in Christianity

==== Missionaries ====
- Audrey Donnithorne (1922–2020), British-Chinese political economist and missionary, prominent in her efforts to rebuild the Catholic Church in China after the Cultural Revolution for which she was awarded the Pro Ecclesia et Pontifice
- Agnes de Selincourt (1872–1917), Christian missionary in India; responsible for the founding of missions; first Principal of Lady Muir Memorial College, Allahabad, India and then Principal of Westfield College, London
- Eva Dykes Spicer MBE (1898-1974), missionary educator in China; later principal of a women’s school in Nigeria
- Margaret Wrong (1887-1948), Canadian educator, missionary administrator and Africanist; Margaret Wrong Prize for African Literature was established in her memory after her death

=== Royalty and nobility ===
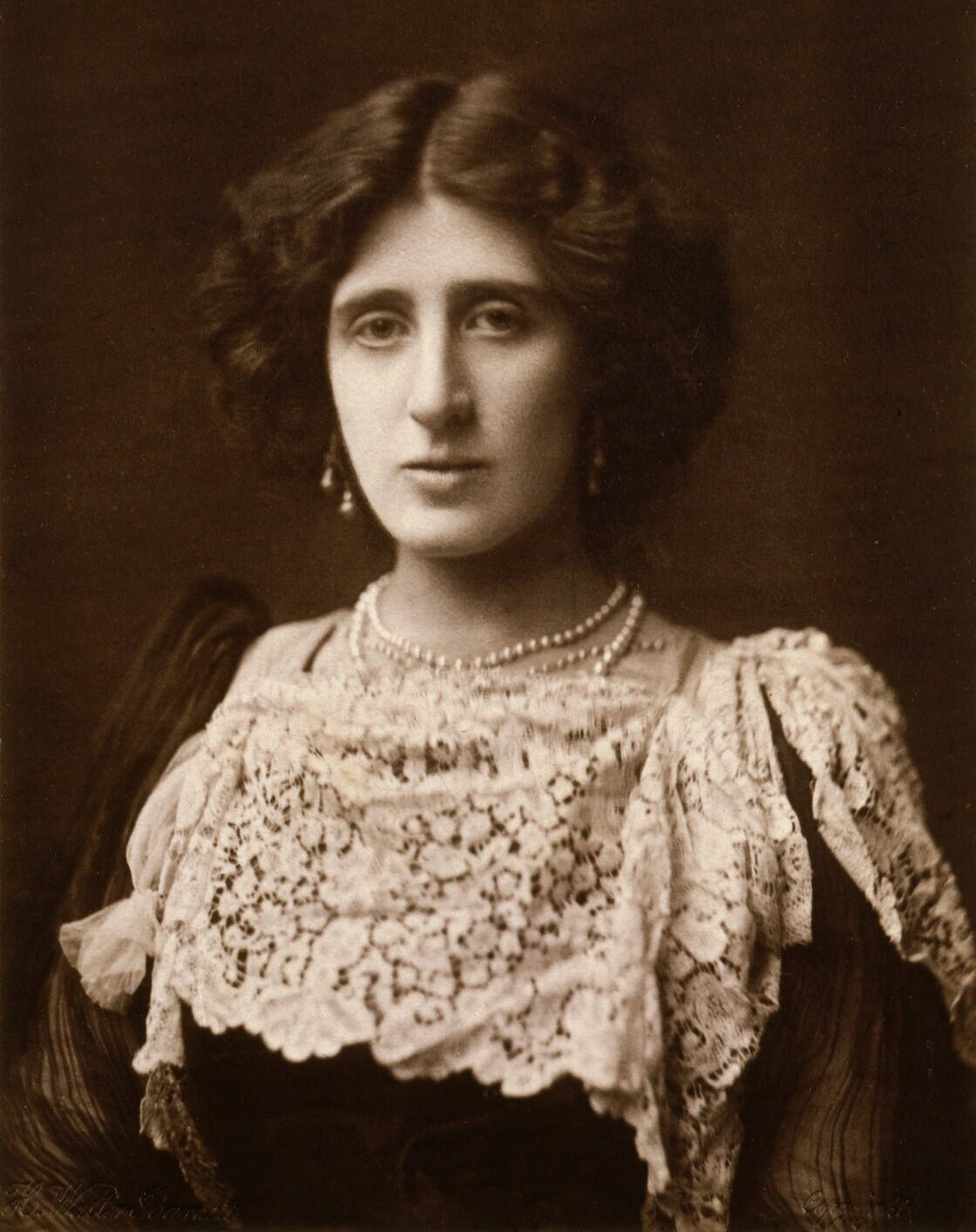
Lady Ottoline Morrell

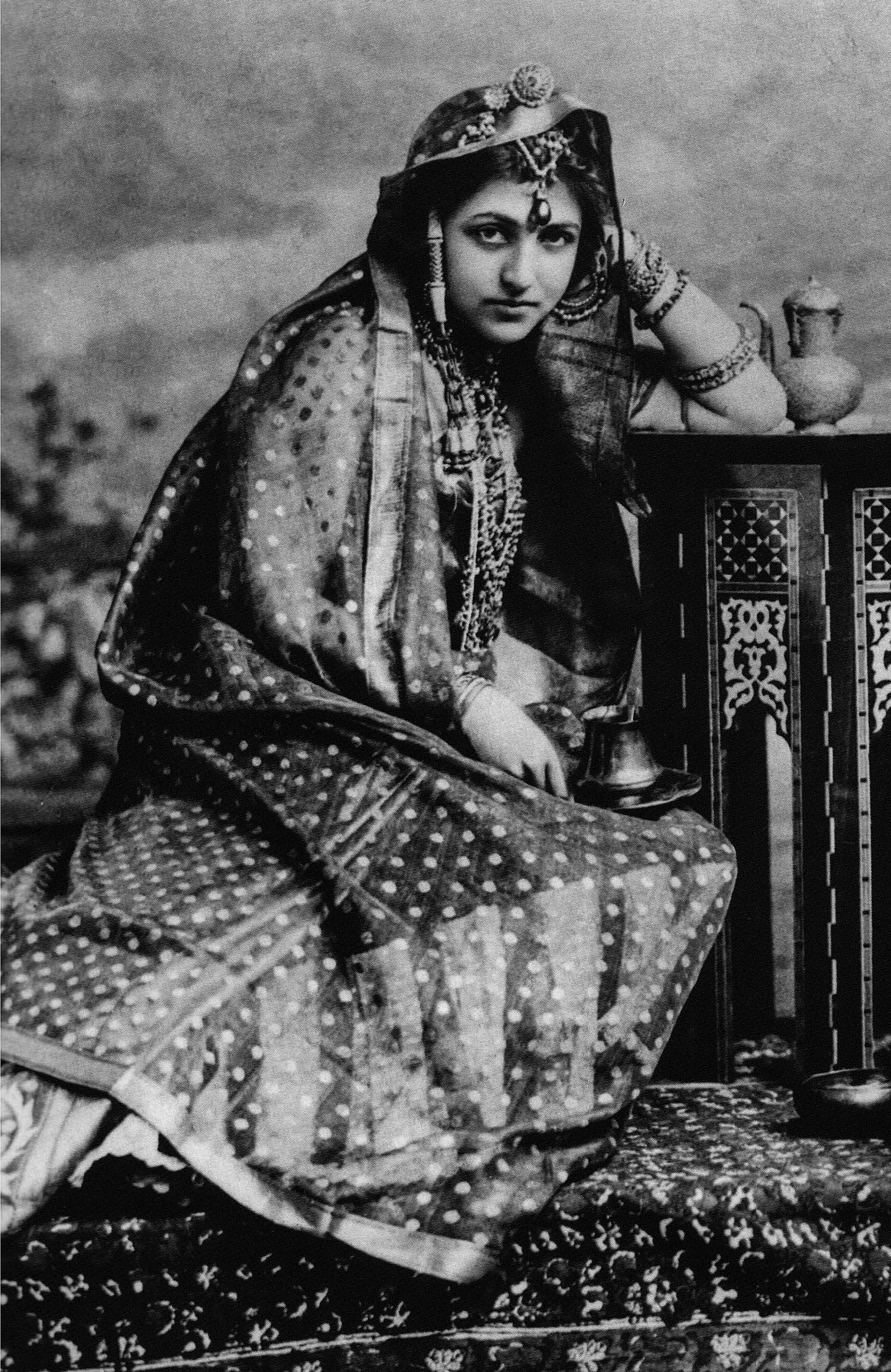
Bamba Sutherland

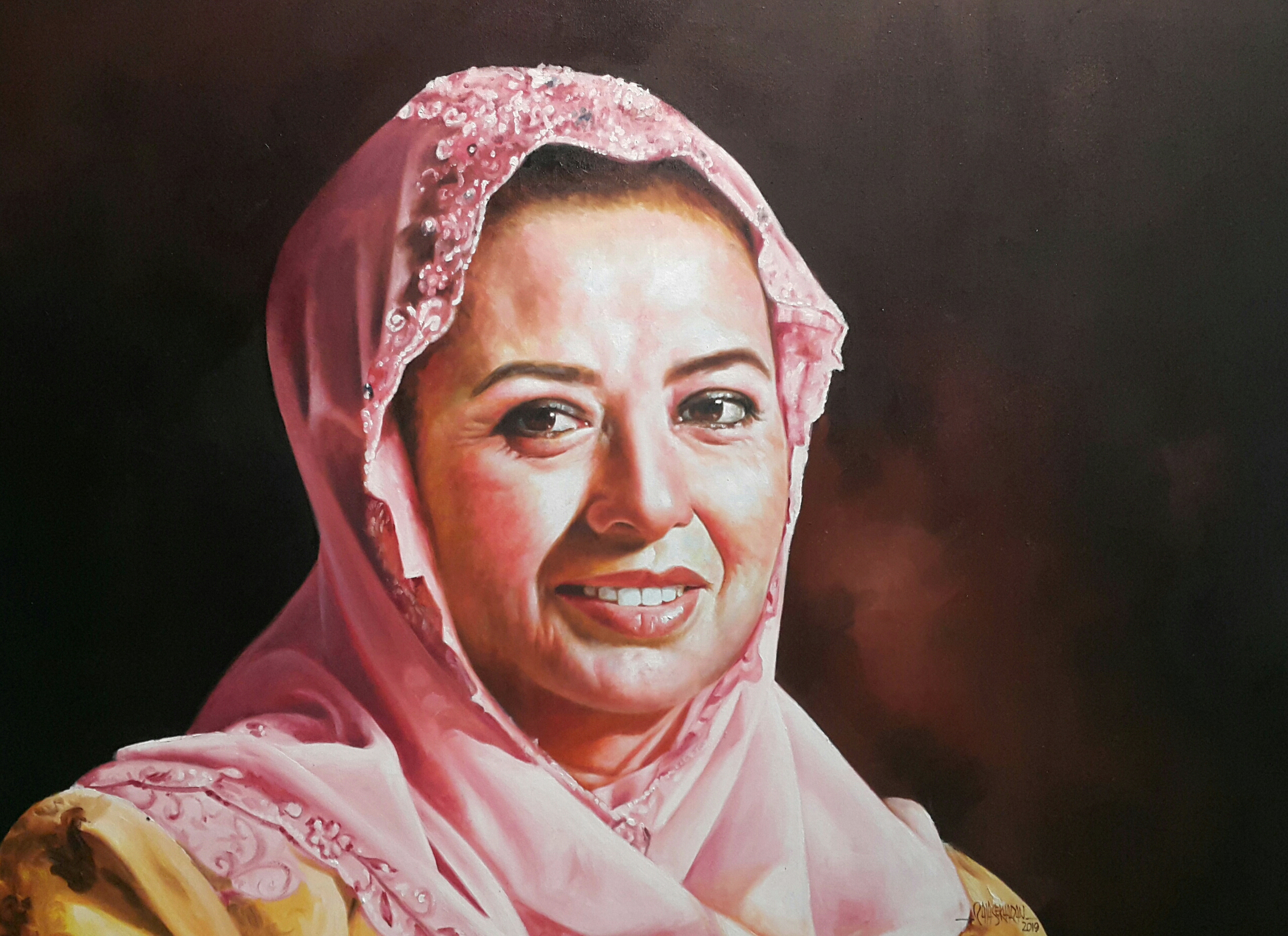
Raja Zarith Sofiah

- Jane, Lady Abdy (1934–2015), English socialite and art dealer, described as one of the most original and respected art dealers of her generation
- Dame Hester Adrian, Baroness Adrian (1899-1966), mental health worker; president of the Howard League for Penal Reform
- Lady Anne Brewis (1911–2002), botanist; daughter of Roundell Palmer, 3rd Earl of Selborne
- Lady Susan Chitty (1929-2021), novelist and a writer of biographies; wife of Sir Thomas Willes Chitty, 3rd Baronet
- Lady Norma Dalrymple-Champneys (1902–1997), scholar of English literature; winner of the Rose Mary Crawshay Prize; wife of Sir Weldon Dalrymple-Champneys, 2nd Baronet
- Amanda Harlech, Baroness Harlech (1959), fashion consultant; named to the International Best Dressed List Hall of Fame
- Christine Longford, Countess of Longford (1900–1980), playwright; wife of Edward Pakenham, 6th Earl of Longford
- Margaret Mackworth, 2nd Viscountess Rhondda (1883–1958), Welsh peeress, businesswoman, significant suffragette, RMS Lusitania survivor, first female director of the Institute of Directors, founder of Time and Tide and the Six Point Group
- The Hon. Mary Anna Marten (1929–2010), aristocrat and landowner who made legal history in the Crichel Down affair; goddaughter of Queen Elizabeth The Queen Mother; High Sheriff of Dorset; archaeologist
- Lady Ottoline Morrell (1873–1938), aristocrat and society hostess; cousin of Queen Elizabeth The Queen Mother; her patronage was influential in artistic and intellectual circles; associated with the Bloomsbury Group; inspiration for several literary characters by Aldous Huxley, D. H. Lawrence, Graham Greene, Alan Bennett and Constance Malleson
- Princess Catherine Hilda Duleep Singh (1871–1942), suffragist; daughter of Maharaja Duleep Singh
- Queen Raja Zarith Sofiah (1959), Queen of Johor and member of the Perak Royal Family
- Princess Bamba Sutherland (1869–1957), daughter of Maharaja Duleep Singh, last surviving member of the family that had ruled the Sikh Empire
- Lady Juliet Townsend (1941–2014), writer, first female Lord Lieutenant of Northamptonshire
- Elizabeth Young, Lady Kennet (1923–2014), writer, researcher, poet, artist, campaigner, analyst and questioning commentator

=== Scientists ===
- Jane Kirkaldy (1869–1932), one of the first women to obtain first-class honours in the natural sciences; contributed greatly to the education of the generation of English women scientists
- Margaret Seward (1864–1939), first Oxford female student to be entered for the honour school of Mathematics; one of the first two female chemistry students at Oxford; earliest chemist on staff at the Royal Holloway (of which she was a founding lecturer); pioneer woman to obtain a first class in the honour school of Natural Science
- Premala Sivaprakasapillai Sivasegaram (1942), Sri Lankan engineer, regarded as the country's first female engineer; acknowledged as one of twelve female change-makers in Sri Lanka by the parliament

==== Biologists ====
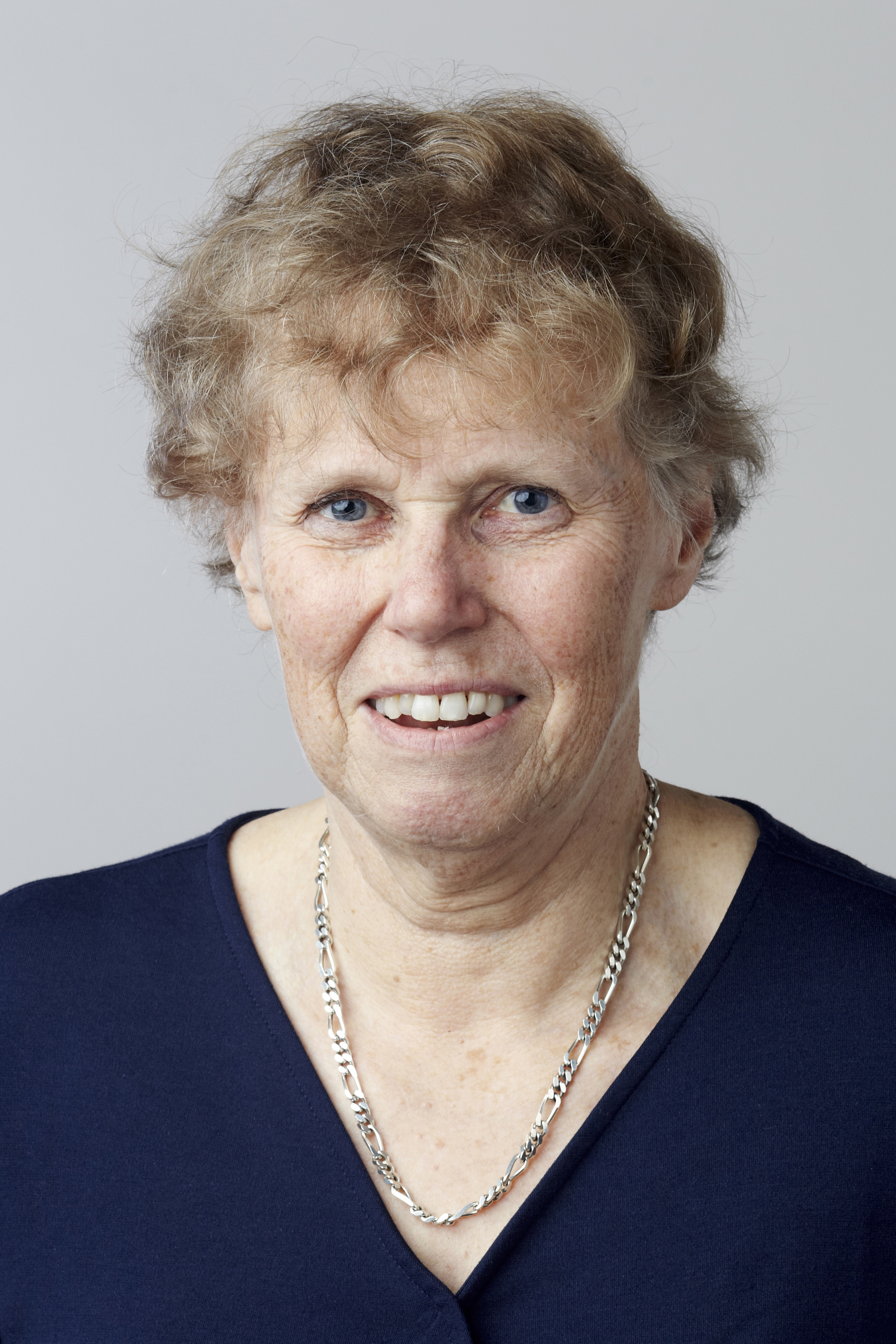
Marian Dawkins

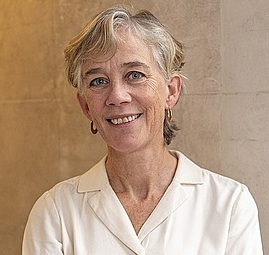
Angela McLean

- Dawn R. Bazely (1960), ecology and evolutionary biology professor
- Victoria Braithwaite (1967–2019), scientist who was the first person to demonstrate that fish feel pain; winner of the FSBI Medal
- Dame Kay Davies (1951), geneticist; Director of the MRC and Oxford Centre for Gene Function; governor of the Wellcome Trust
- Valerie Todd Davies (1920-2012), New Zealand arachnologist
- Marian Dawkins (1945), biologist; professor of ethology; wife of Richard Dawkins
- Marianne Fillenz (1924–2012), neuroscientist
- Lilian Jane Gould (1861–1936), biologist; one of the first women admitted to the Linnaean Society; one of the first European breeders of Siamese cats
- Shirley Hodgson (1945), geneticist
- Loeske Kruuk, evolutionary ecologist; winner of the Philip Leverhulme Prize
- Rosalind Maskell (1928–2016), microbiologist known for her work on urinary tract infections
- Dame Angela McLean (1961), professor of mathematical biology
- Jane Mellanby (1938-2021), neuroscientist and academic
- Christine Nicol, Professor of Animal Welfare at the Royal Veterinary College; winner of the Prince Laurent Foundation prize; her work has contributed to EU ban on conventional battery cages for laying hens in 2012
- Sohaila Rastan, geneticist
- Elsie Maud Wakefield (1886–1972), mycologist and plant pathologist

===== Botanists =====
- Lady Anne Brewis (1911–2002), botanist; daughter of Roundell Palmer, 3rd Earl of Selborne
- Adeline May Cowan (1892–1981), botanist who was active in India
- Emilia Frances Noel (c. 1868–1950), botanist, author and illustrator
- Molly Marples (1908-1998), New Zealand microbial ecologist/medical mycologist who spent most of her career at the University of Otago; noted as an early proponent of the theory that skin provides an ecosystem that supports a diversity of microorganisms
- Edith Philip Smith (1897–1976), Scottish botanist and teacher
- Pat Wolseley (1938), botanist specialised in lichen

==== Chemists ====
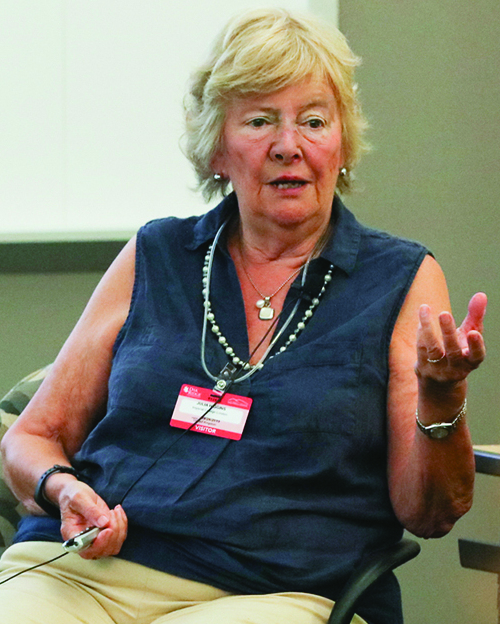
Julia Higgins

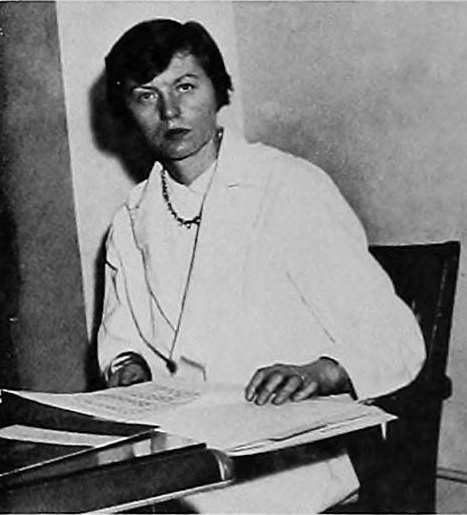
Barbara Low

- Jean Baum, American chemist, distinguished professor of chemistry and chemical biology at Rutgers University
- Jenny Pickworth Glusker (1931), biochemist and crystallographer; winner of the Garvan–Olin Medal, John Scott Medal and William Procter Prize for Scientific Achievement
- Rita Harradence (1915–2012), Australian biochemist who synthesised penicillamine; 1851 Exhibition Scholar
- Pauline Harrison (1926–2024), protein crystallographer
- Dame Julia Higgins (1942), polymer scientist, winner of the Holweck Medal and Legion of Honour, President of the British Science Association, Institution of Chemical Engineers and Institute of Physics
- Dorothy Hodgkin (1910–1994), Nobel Prize winner for her discovery of the structure of Vitamin B12 and development of protein crystallography; first, and only, British woman to win a Nobel Prize in science; first woman to receive maternity pay at Oxford University and first female Chancellor of the University of Bristol
- Judith Howard (1945), distinguished chemist and crystallographer
- Margaret Jope (1913–2004), Scottish biochemist
- Cecily Littleton (1926-2022), X-ray crystallographer and horticulturalist; great-granddaughter of Charles Darwin; developed the statistical analysis techniques to model crystal structures
- Barbara Low (1920–2019), biochemist and biophysicist involved in discovering the structure of penicillin and the characteristics of other antibiotics
- Mary Watson (1856–1933), one of the first two female chemistry students at Oxford

==== Earth scientists ====
- Helen ApSimon (1942), climatologist and academic; known for her research into the transport of radioactivity from the Chernobyl disaster
- Mary Winearls Porter (1886–1980), crystallographer and geologist, known for her publications about ancient Roman architecture.

==== Mathematicians ====
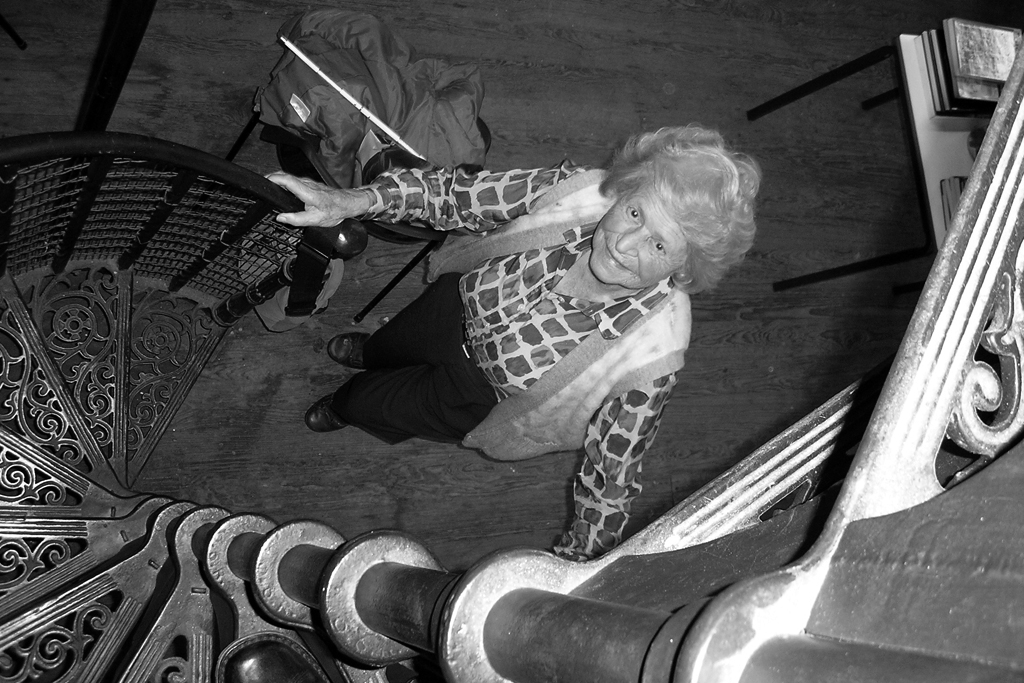
Kathleen Ollerenshaw

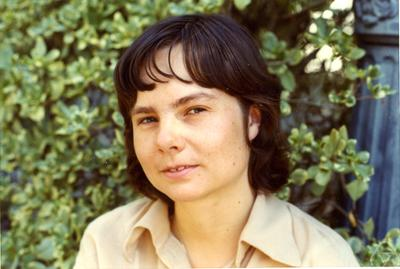
Caroline Series

- Kathryn Chaloner (1954–2014), statistician
- Anne Cobbe (1920–1971), mathematician
- Jane Kister (1944–2019), mathematical logician and executive editor of Mathematical Reviews
- Pamela Liebeck (1930–2012), mathematician and mathematics educator
- Hilary Ockendon (1941), applied mathematician and an expert on problems in fluid dynamics
- Dame Kathleen Ollerenshaw (1912–2014), mathematician, politician, Lord Mayor of Manchester
- Robyn Owens, Australian applied mathematician and computer scientist known for her research in computer vision and face recognition
- Caroline Series (1951), mathematician; President of the London Mathematical Society; Whitehead Prize winner
- Mary Wynne Warner (1932–1998), mathematician, specializing in fuzzy mathematics

==== Physicists ====
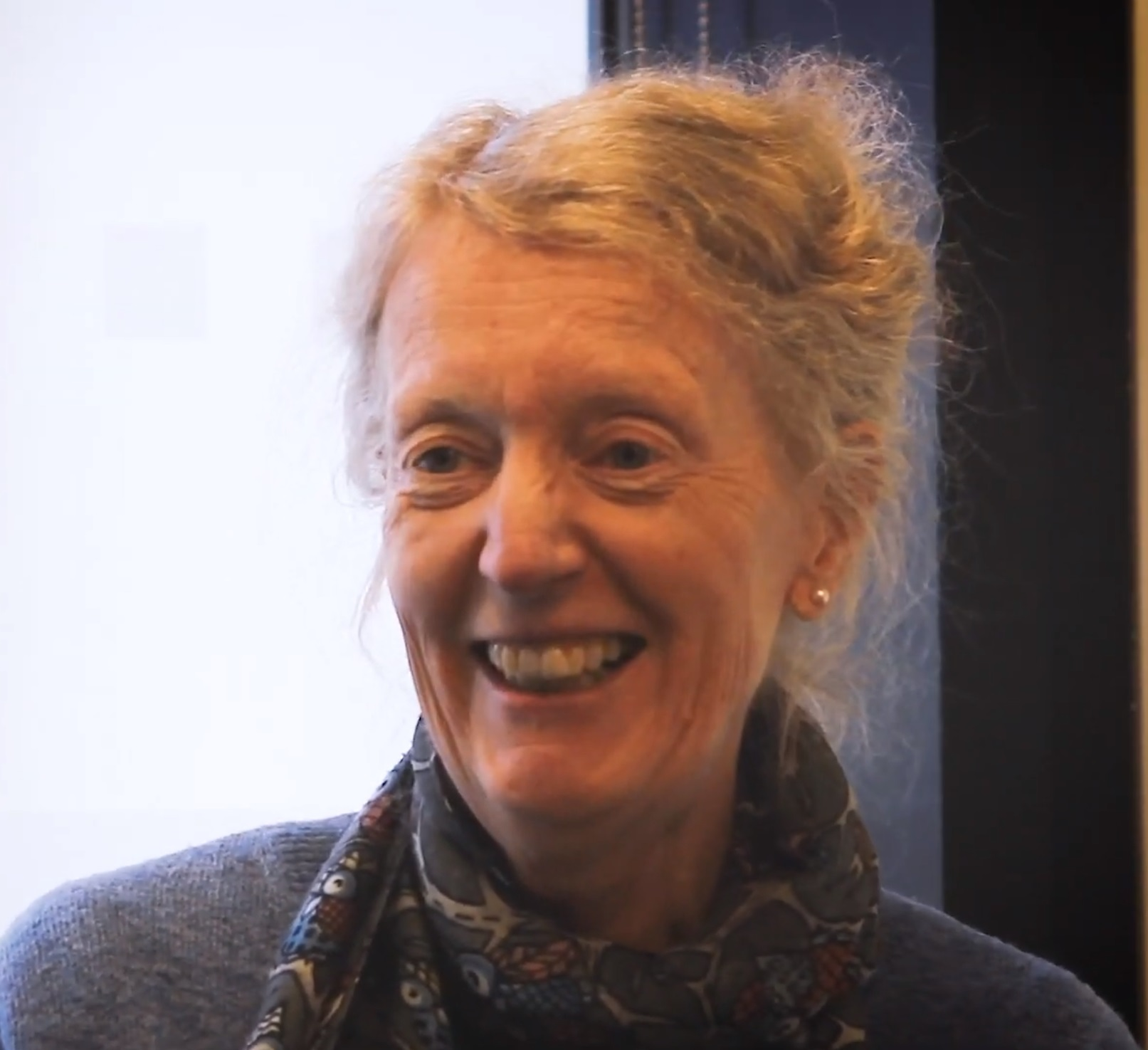
Joanna Haigh

- Joanna Haigh (1954), physicist and academic; President of the Royal Meteorological Society
- Jacqueline Mitton (1948), astronomer, writer, and media consultant; asteroid 4027 Mitton is named after her
- Alexandra Olaya-Castro (1976), Colombian theoretical physicist; winner of the Maxwell Prize
- Anne Tropper (1954), physicist
- Julia Yeomans (1954), theoretical physicist and academic

=== Social scientists ===
- Reem Bassiouney (1973), Egyptian author and professor of sociolinguistics; Sawiris Cultural Award winner
- Heather Grabbe (1970), Senior Fellow at the think-tank Bruegel in Brussels; director of the Open Society European Policy Institute
- Gwendolen M. Carter (1906–1991), Canadian-American political scientist; one of the founders of African Studies in the United States; first female president of the African Studies Association; among the most widely known scholars of African affairs in the twentieth century
- Ann Oakley (1944), sociologist, feminist, and writer; author of The Men's Room
- Nandini Sundar (1967), Indian professor of sociology; recipient of the Infosys Prize for Social Sciences

==== Anthropologists ====
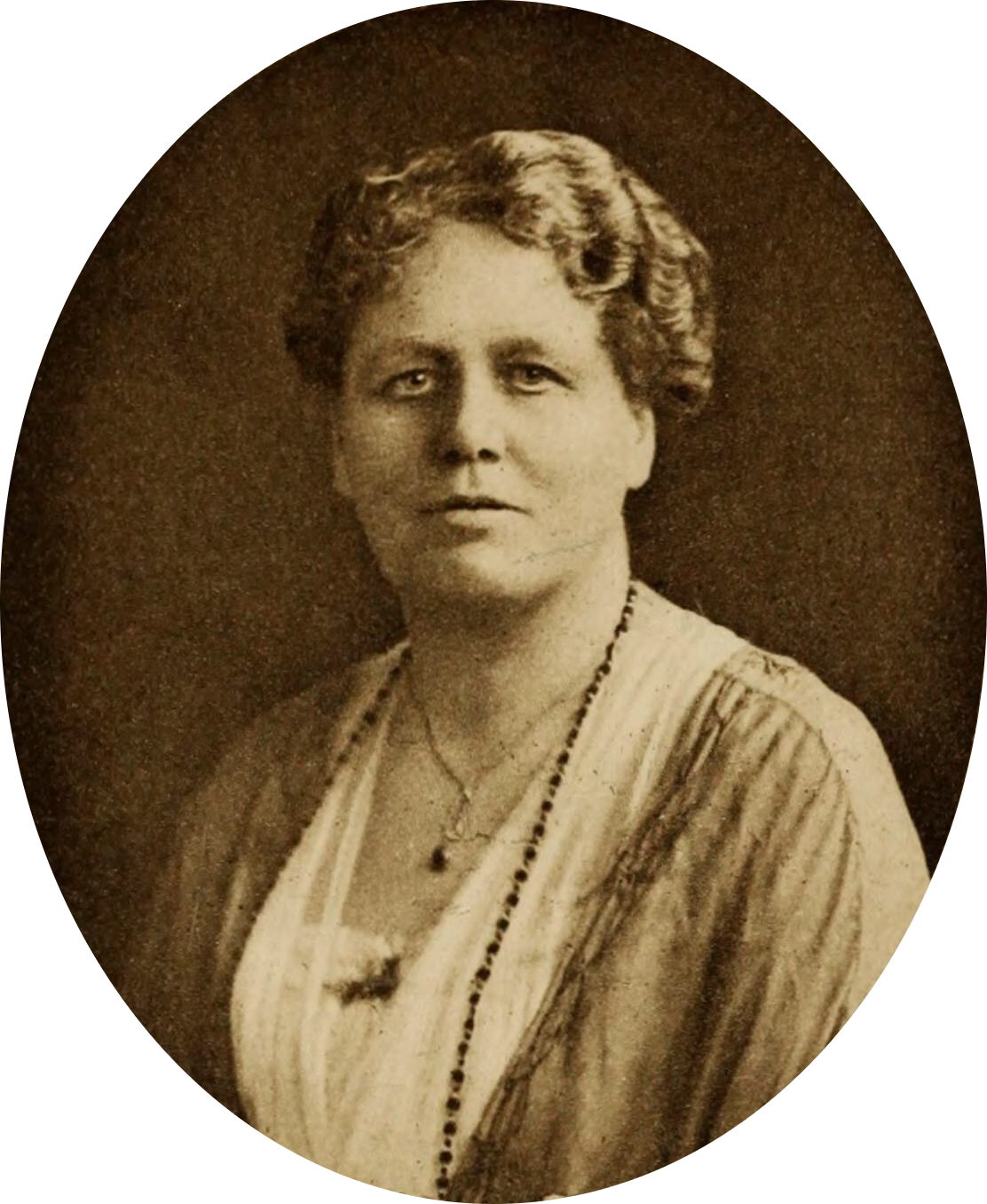
Katherine Routledge

- Brenda Beck (c. 1940), anthropologist and Tamil culture icon
- Beatrice Blackwood (1889–1975), anthropologist; ran the Pitt Rivers Museum
- Maria Czaplicka (1884–1921), Polish cultural anthropologist best known for her ethnography of Siberian shamanism; first woman to receive a Mianowski Scholarship and first female lecturer in anthropology at Oxford
- Rada Dyson-Hudson (1930-2016), American anthropologist
- Ruth Finnegan (1933), Northern Irish linguistic anthropologist; recipient of the Rivers Memorial Medal
- Barbara Freire-Marreco (1879–1967), anthropologist and folklorist; one of the first two women to gain a Diploma in Anthropology at Oxford
- Katherine Routledge (1866–1935), archaeologist and anthropologist who initiated the first true survey of Easter Island (leader of the Mana Expedition)
- Mai Yamani (1956), independent scholar, author and anthropologist; first Saudi Arabian woman to obtain a M.St. and a D.Phil. from Oxford

==== Economists ====
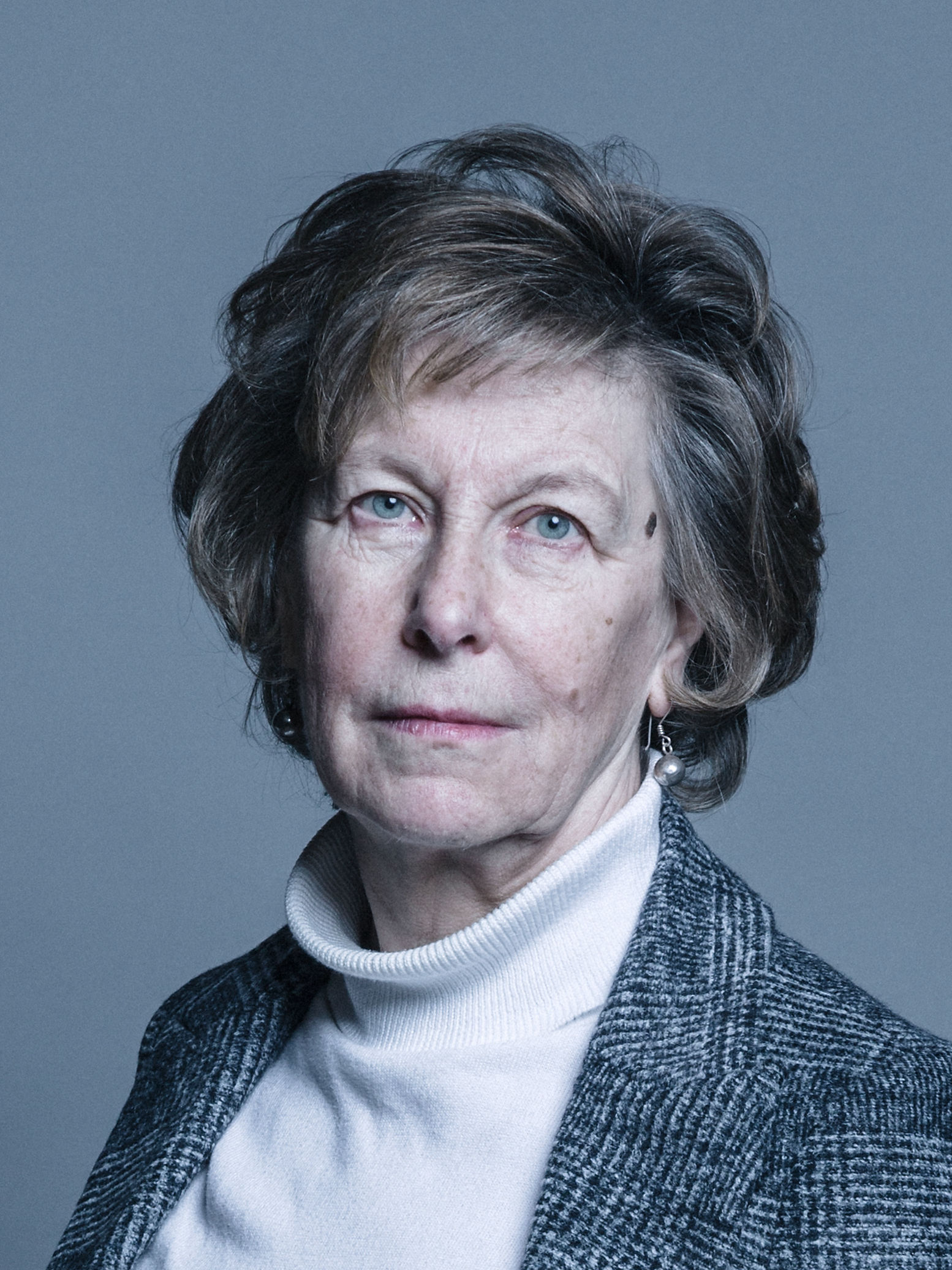
Alison Wolf, Baroness Wolf of Dulwich

- Julia Aglionby (1969), economist, land agent, and politician
- C. Violet Butler (1884-1982), social researcher and educator
- Audrey Donnithorne (1922–2020), British-Chinese political economist and missionary, prominent in her efforts to rebuild the Catholic Church in China after the Cultural Revolution for which she was awarded the Pro Ecclesia et Pontifice
- Rachel Glennerster (1965), Chief Economist at the Department for International Development
- Ursula Kathleen Hicks (1896–1985), Irish-born economist and academic
- Dame Barbara Ward, Baroness Jackson of Lodsworth (1914–1981), economist and writer interested in the problems of developing countries; winner of the Jawaharlal Nehru Award
- Mary Kaldor (1946), academic; current Professor of Global Governance at the LSE; daughter of Nicholas Kaldor
- Utsa Patnaik, Indian Marxist economist
- Frances Stewart (1940), professor emeritus of development economics; daughter of Nicholas Kaldor
- Doreen Warriner (1904–1972), development economist, known chiefly for her role in rescuing refugees just before World War II
- Alison Wolf, Baroness Wolf of Dulwich (1949), economist and professor at KCL

=== Sports ===
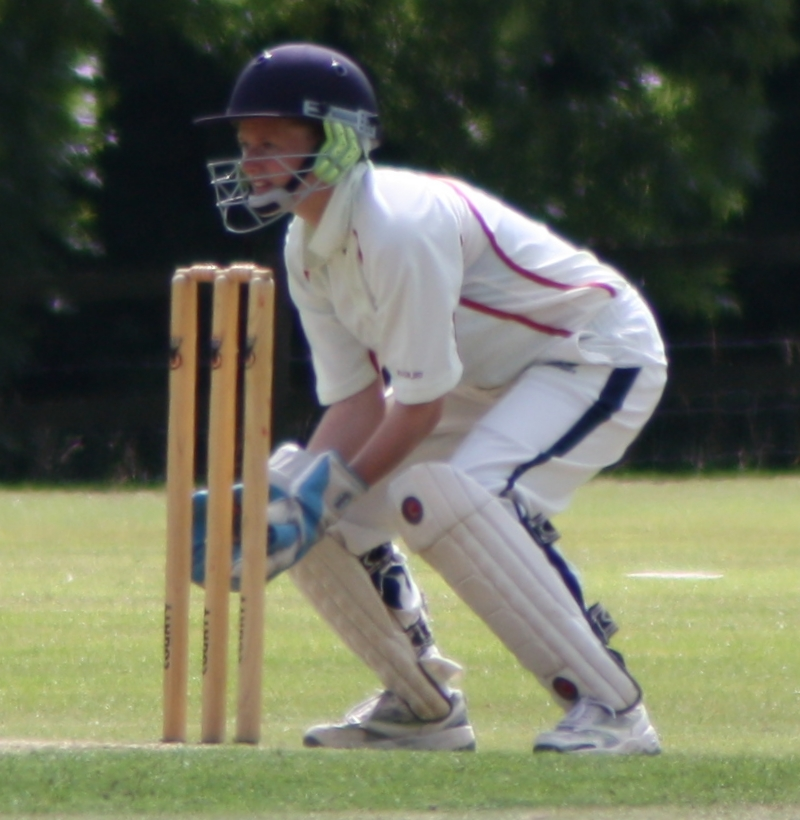
Sophie Le Marchand

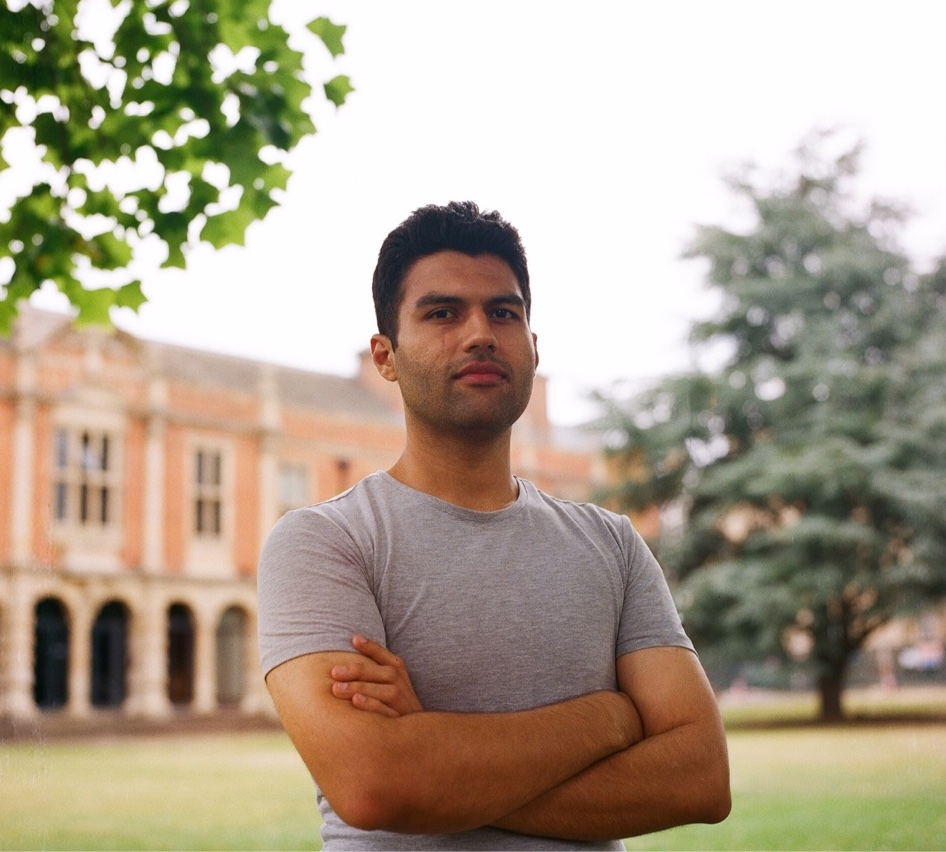
Smit Singh

- Margaret Darvall (1909–1996), mountaineer; president of the Ladies' Alpine Club and the Pinnacle Club
- Rosamund Dashwood (1924–2007), one of the top female masters (i.e. over 35) runners in Canadian history
- Sheila Hill (1928-2022), cricketer, umpire, scorer and administrator; helped with the development of the Association of Cricket Umpires and Scorers and was the first woman to be elected to its general council; one of the first ten women granted honorary MCC membership
- Sophie Le Marchand (1988), cricketer
- Jamie Powe (1995), cricketer
- Mary Russell Vick (1922–2012), field hockey player
- Smit Singh (1991), present National Record holder of India in skeet shooting
- Dorjana Širola (1972), Croatian quizzer, linguist and anglicist; highest placed woman at the World Quizzing Championship in seven years; winner of University Challenge for Somerville
- Claire Tomlinson (1944), highest-rated female polo player; first woman to win the County Cup and the Queen's Cup; first woman in the world to rise to five goals; first female player in The Varsity Polo Match; first female captain of the OUPC

==== Rowers ====
- Fiona Freckleton (1960), rower; bronze medalist in women's pairs, World Rowing Championships, Vienna, 1991; competed at the 1992 Summer Olympics and 1993 World Rowing Championships
- Jennifer Goldsack (1982), American rower; competed at the 2008 Summer Olympics
- Luka Grubor (1973), Croatian rower; won a gold medal at the 2000 Summer Olympics
- Patricia Reid (1964), rower; competed at the 1992 Summer Olympics; silver and bronze medalist at the 1986 Commonwealth Games

=== Spies ===
- Jenifer Hart (1914–2005), academic and senior civil servant; accused of having been a spy for the Soviet Union
- Daphne Park, Baroness Park of Monmouth (1921–2010), spy, clandestine senior controller in MI6; Principal of Somerville College
- Phoebe Pool (1913–1971), art historian and spy for the Soviet Union

=== Translators ===
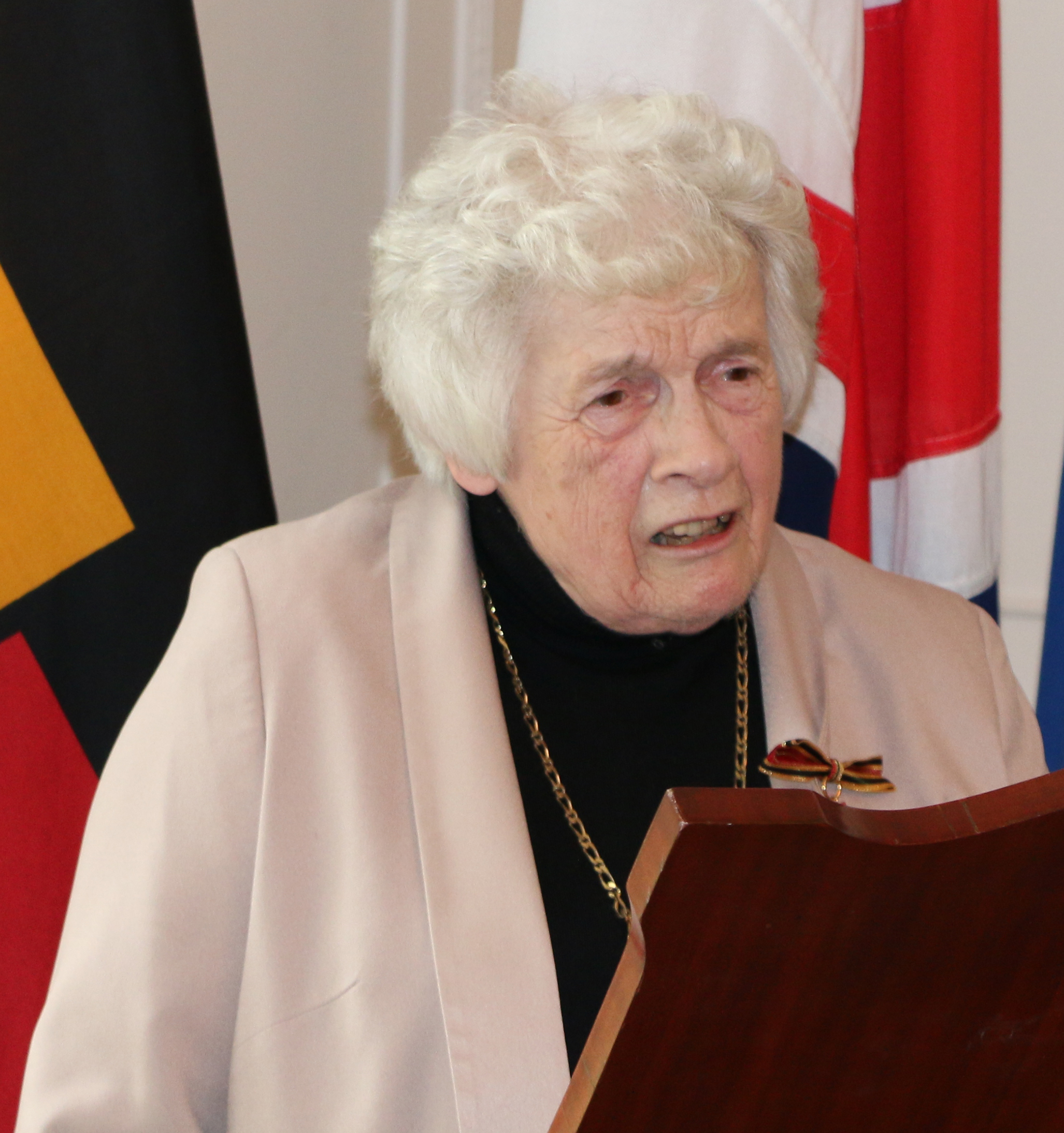
Anthea Bell

- Anthea Bell (1936–2018), translator of numerous literary works, especially children's literature, including Austerlitz and the French Asterix comics
- Catherine Glyn Davies (1926–2007), Welsh historian of philosophy and linguistics; translator
- Lucienne Hill (1923–2012), French-English translator and actor; winner of the Evening Standard Theatre Award and Tony Award
- Emily Lorimer (1881–1949), Anglo-Irish journalist, linguist, political analyst, and writer
- Janet Seymour-Smith (1930-1998), worked as a translator of Greek texts for Robert Graves and she became a life-long muse and collaborator with her husband Martin Seymour-Smith
- Helen Waddell (1889–1965), Irish poet, translator and playwright; winner of the Benson Medal
- Eithne Wilkins (1914-1975), New Zealand Germanic Studies scholar, translator and poet
- Beryl de Zoete (1879–1962), ballet dancer, orientalist, dance critic and dance researcher; also known as a translator of Italo Svevo and Alberto Moravia

== Fellows & staff ==
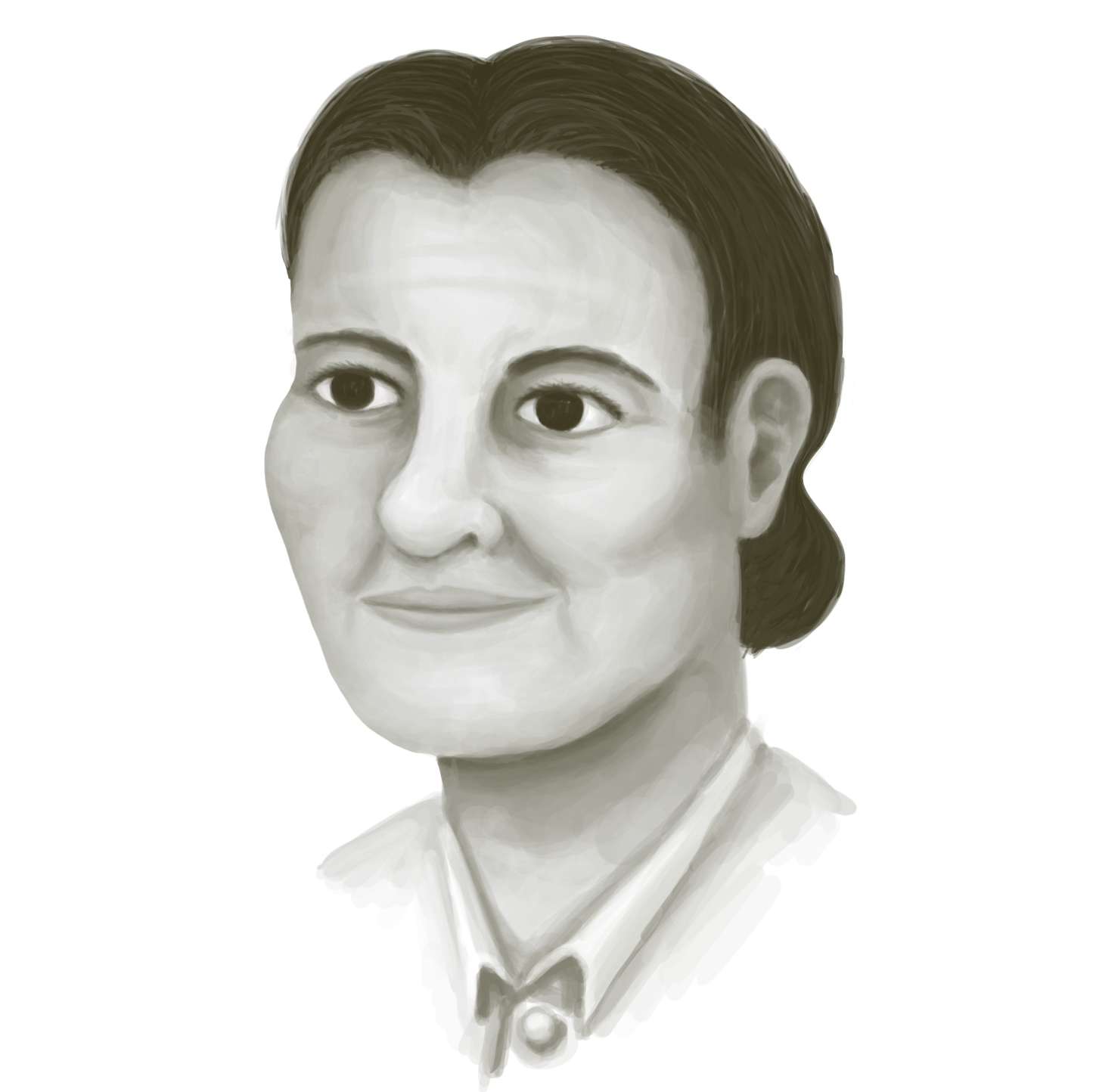
G. E. M. Anscombe

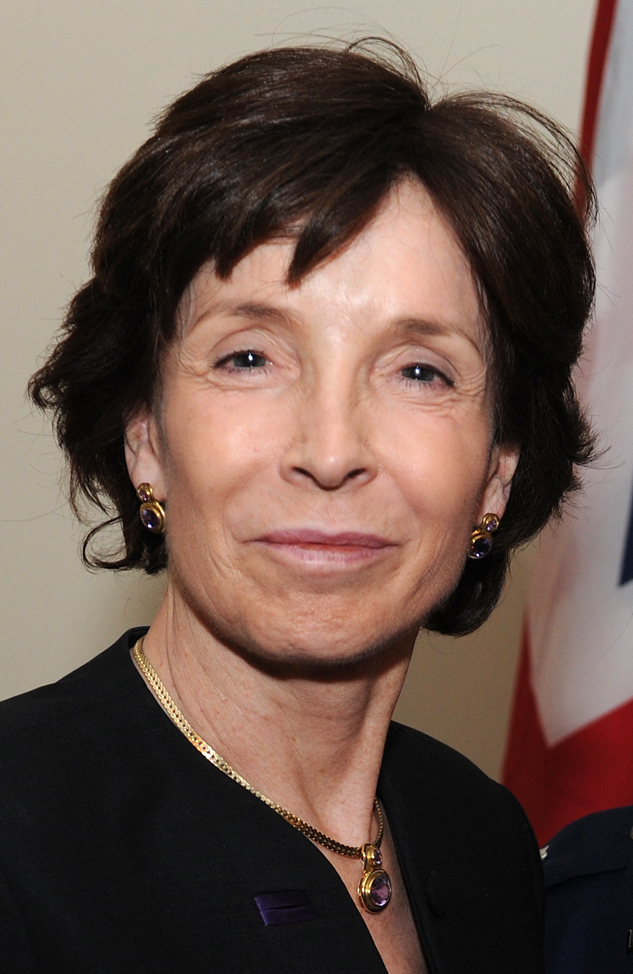
Mary Archer

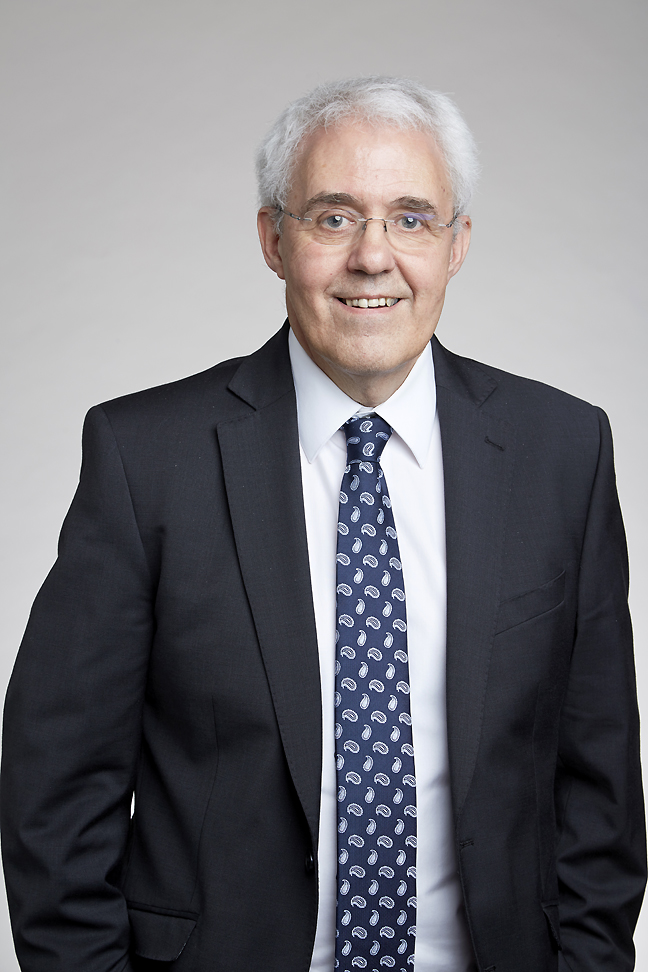
Tony Bell

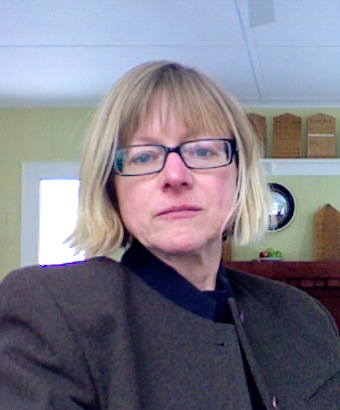
Helen DeWitt

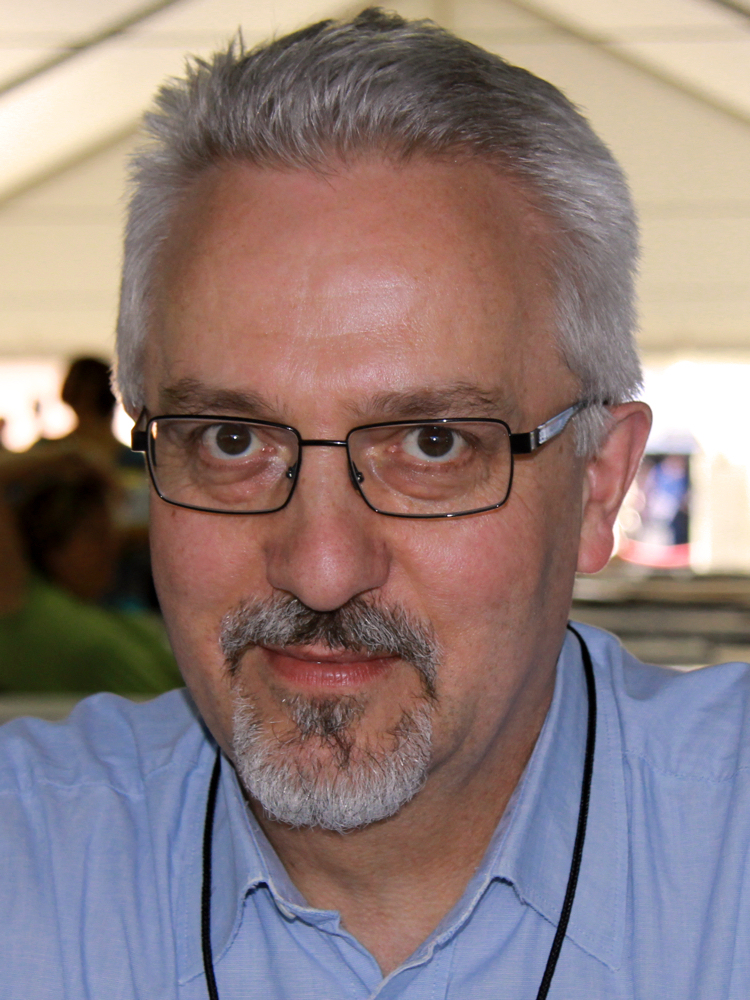
Alan Hollinghurst

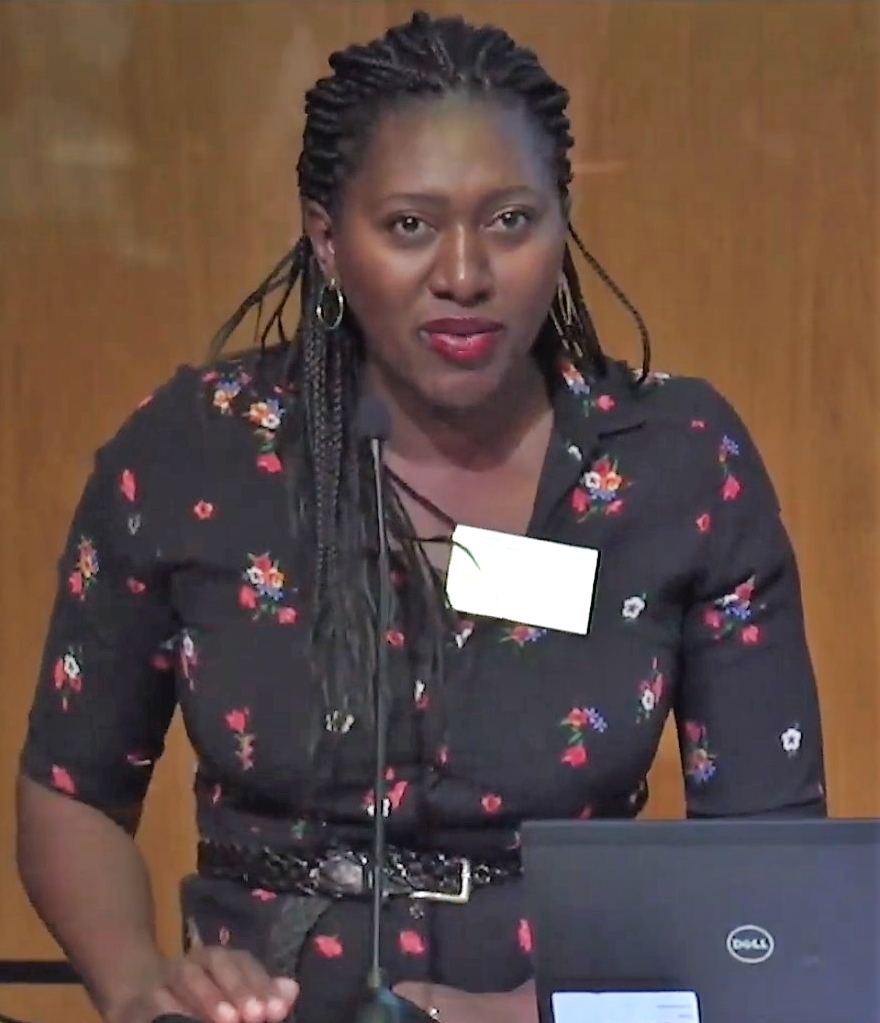
Patricia Kingori

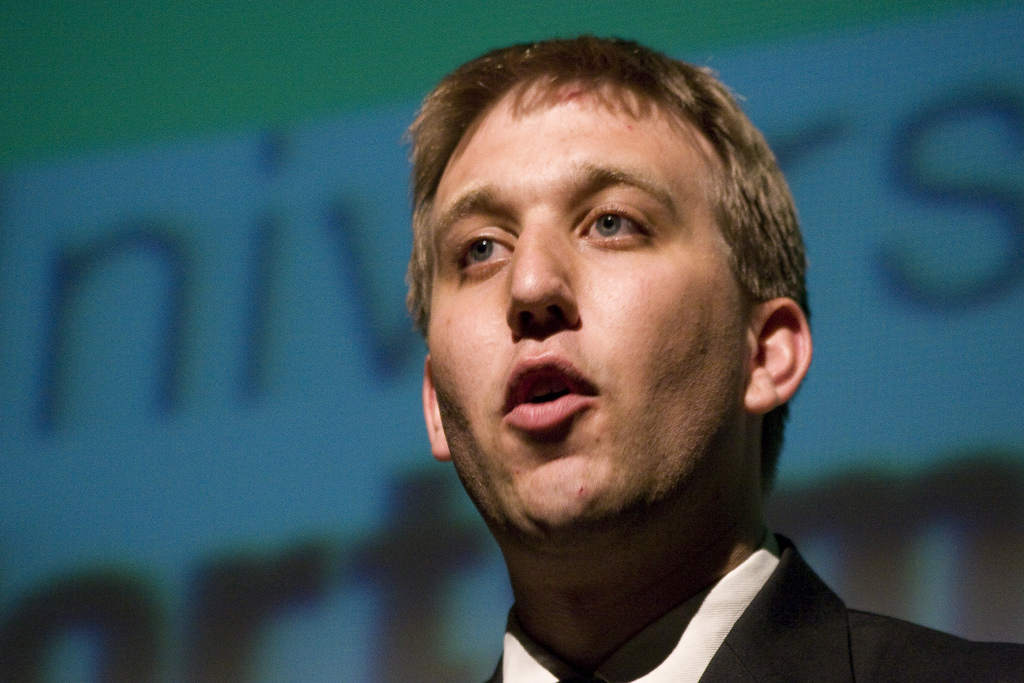
Chris Lintott

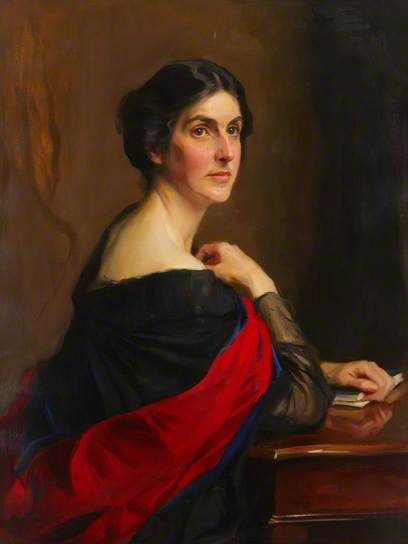
Bertha Phillpotts

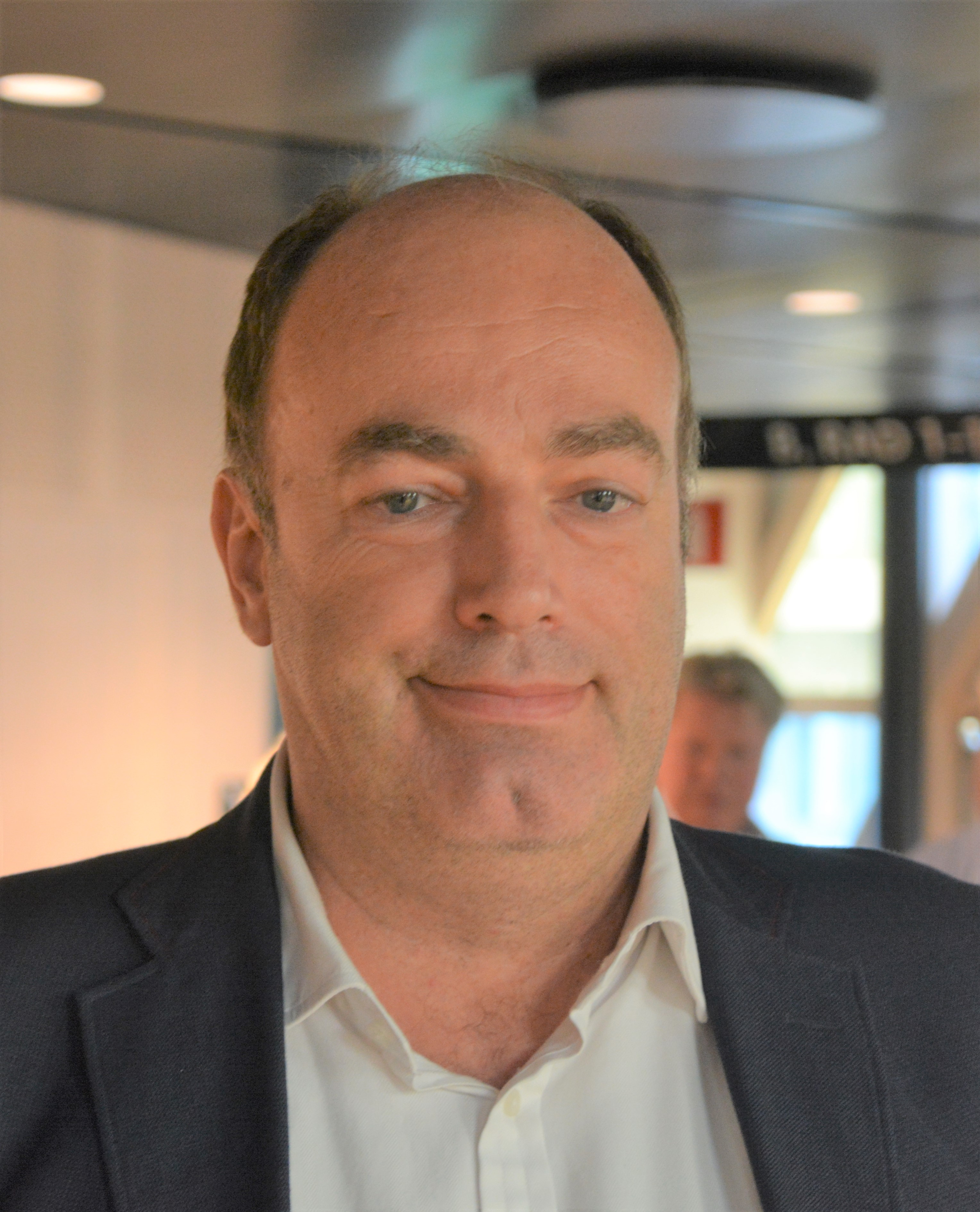
Charles Spence

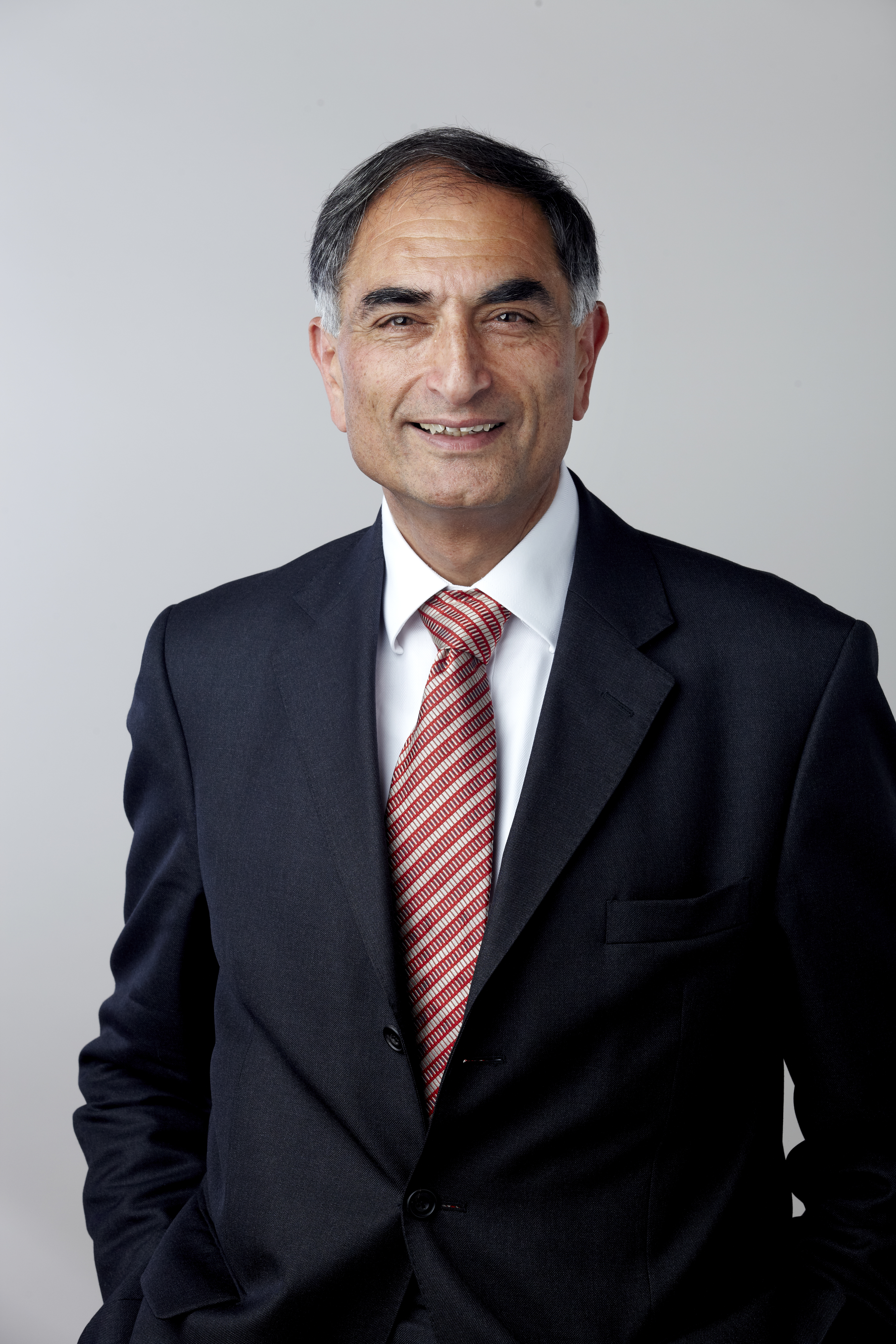
Rajesh Thakker

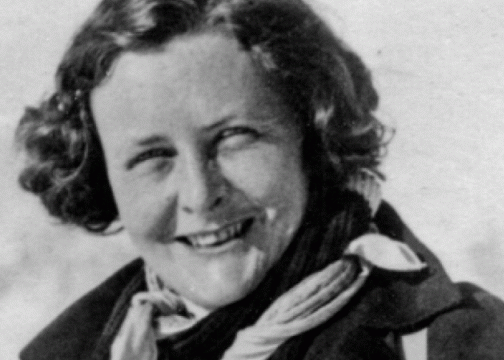
Doreen Warriner

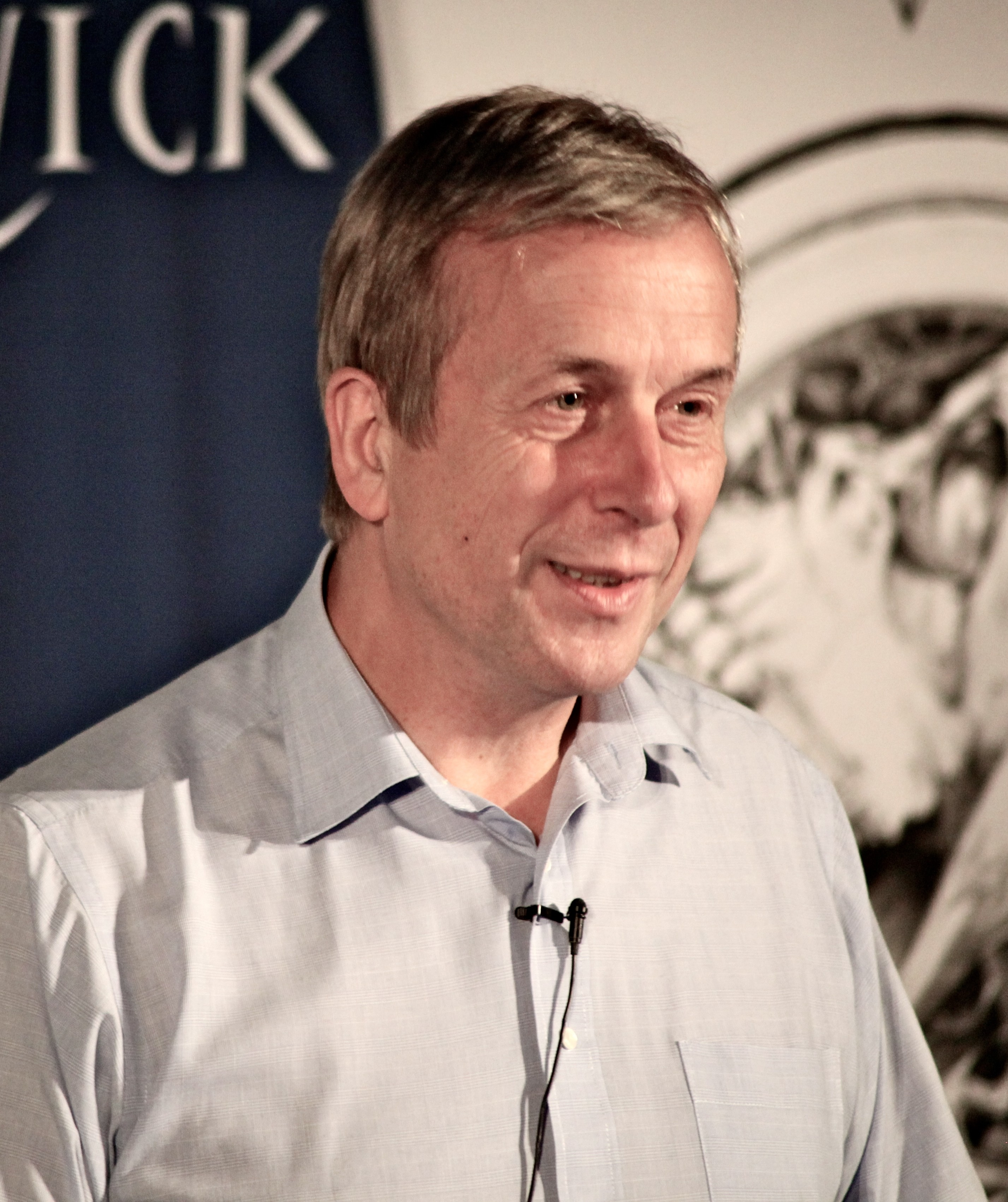
Kevin Warwick

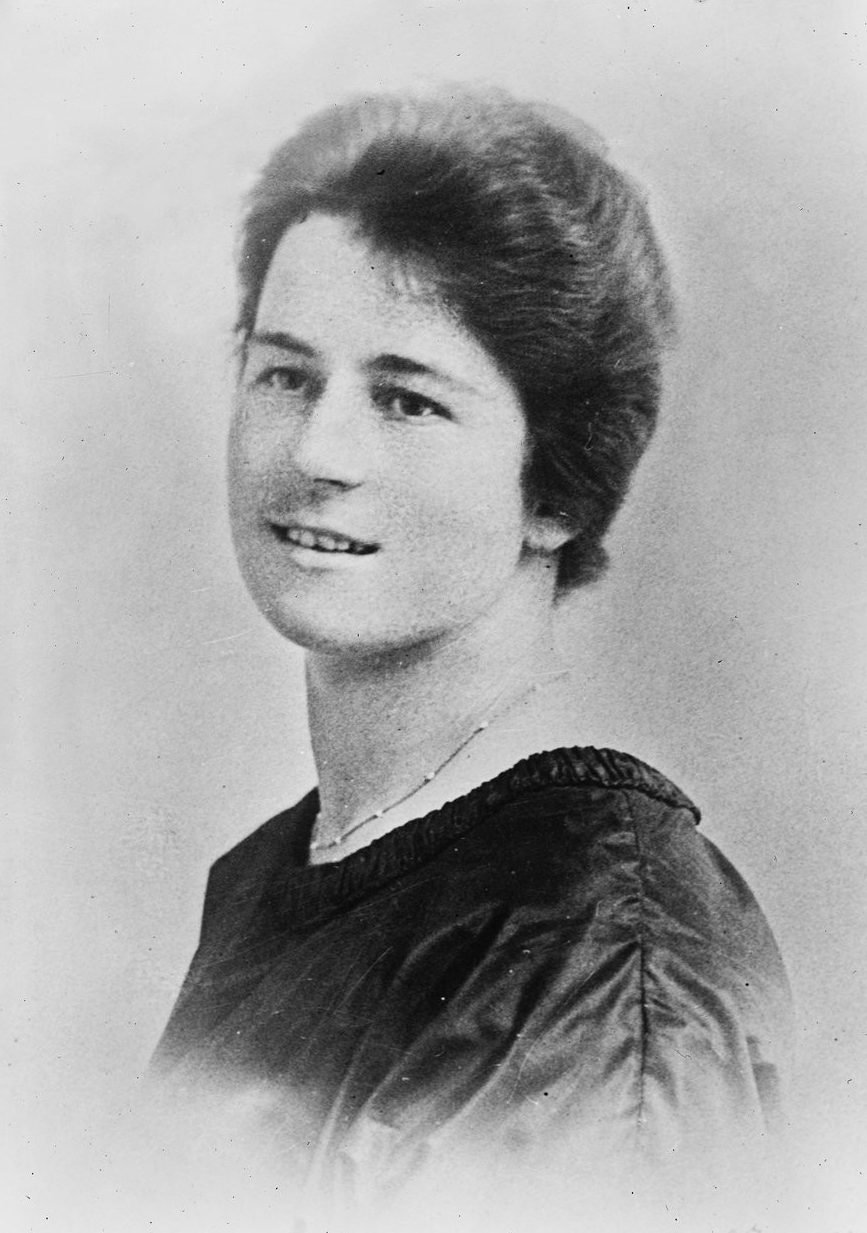
Dorothy Maud Wrinch

- G. E. M. Anscombe (1919–2001), analytic philosopher
- Mary Archer (1944), Baroness Archer of Weston-super-Mare (1944), scientist specialising in solar power conversion; wife of Jeffrey Archer
- Jean Banister (1917-2013), physiologist; first female Departmental Demonstrator in Physiology at Oxford
- David Barford, medical researcher
- Annie Barnes (1903–2003), reader in French literature
- Elise Jenny Baumgartel (1892–1975), German Egyptologist and prehistorian who pioneered the study of the archaeology of predynastic Egypt
- Amita Baviskar, sociologist studying the cultural politics of environment and development in rural and urban India; awarded the Infosys Prize
- Tony Bell FRS, physicist; winner of the Hoyle Medal and Prize, Eddington Medal and Hannes Alfvén Prize
- Margarete Bieber (1879–1978), Jewish German-American art historian, classical archaeologist and professor, second woman university professor in Germany
- Käthe Bosse-Griffiths (1910–1998), German-born Egyptologist and writer in the Welsh language
- Sarah Broom (1972–2013), New Zealand poet; the Sarah Broom Poetry Prize is named after her
- Gráinne de Búrca (1966), Irish legal scholar, specialising in European Union law
- Nina Byers (1930–2014), theoretical physicist
- Muriel St. Clare Byrne (1895–1983), historical researcher
- Herman Cappelen (1967), Norwegian philosopher
- April Carter (1937), peace activist; active in the anti-nuclear movement in the United Kingdom
- Lars-Erik Cederman (1963), Swiss-Swedish political scientist; winner of the Marcel Benoist Prize
- Clare Chambers (1976), political philosopher
- Maude Clarke (1892–1935), Irish historian; first female to join Queen's University Belfast’s academic staff
- Anne Cobbe (1920–1971), mathematician
- Amalia Coldea, Romanian quantum physicist
- Helen De Cruz (1978), Belgian philosopher
- Henriette Dahan Kalev (1947), Israeli feminist theorist and political scientist; one of the founders of the Mizrahi feminist movement, and one of the leading theorists of Mizrahi feminism
- Stephanie Dalley (1943), scholar of the Ancient Near East
- Lady Norma Dalrymple-Champneys (1902–1997, librarian), scholar of English literature; winner of the Rose Mary Crawshay Prize
- Marian Dawkins (1945), biologist; professor of ethology; wife of Richard Dawkins
- Helen DeWitt (1957), novelist; writer of The Last Samurai and Lightning Rods
- Ursula Dronke (1920–2012), medievalist
- Nan Dunbar (1928–2005), classicist
- Katherine Duncan-Jones FRSL (1941), literature and Shakespeare scholar
- Jennifer Durrant (1942), artist-in-residence
- Dorothy Emmet (1904–2000), philosopher; a founder member of the Epiphany Philosophers
- Karin Erdmann (1948), German mathematician
- Colin Espie FRSM FBPsS (1957), Scottish neuroscientist and Professor of Sleep Medicine
- Barbara Everett, academic and literary critic
- Dorothy Everett (1894-1953), scholar of medieval literature
- Marc Feldmann (1944), Australian immunologist; winner of the Crafoord Prize, Lasker-DeBakey Clinical Medical Research Award, Cameron Prize for Therapeutics of the University of Edinburgh, Dr. Paul Janssen Award for Biomedical Research, Ernst Schering Prize and Canada Gairdner International Award.
- Philippa Foot (1920–2010), philosopher and creator of the trolley problem
- Barbara Freire-Marreco (1879–1967), anthropologist and folklorist; one of the first two women to gain a Diploma in Anthropology at Oxford
- Margery Fry (1874–1958), prison reformer; one of the first women to become a magistrate
- Elspeth Garman (1954), professor of molecular biophysics; President of the British Crystallographic Association; the "Garman limit" is named after her; winner of the Suffrage Science award
- Benjamin Goodson (1990), British-German conductor
- Pelagia Goulimari (1964), Greek-British author, editor, and academic specialising in literary criticism, feminist theory, continental philosophy, and writing in English from 1740 to the present; co-founded Angelaki
- Hilary Greaves (1978), philosopher
- Charlotte Byron Green (1842–1929, Vice-President), promoter of women's education
- Miriam T. Griffin (1935–2018), American classical scholar; held the first Women in Classics dinner (at Somerville College)
- Sarah Gurr, plant pathologist
- Grace Eleanor Hadow (1875–1940), author, principal of St Anne's College, Oxford, and vice-chairman of the Women's Institute
- Edith Hall (1959), scholar of classics, specialising in ancient Greek literature and cultural history
- Helena Hamerow (1961), Professor of Early Medieval Archaeology; former Head of the School of Archaeology at Oxford
- Jenny Harrison (1949), American mathematician
- Barbara Harvey (1928), medieval historian
- Margaret Hayes-Robinson (1876-1930), historian and the head of Royal Holloway's History Department
- Isobel Henderson (1906–1967), ancient historian; one of the first woman tutors to be allowed to join Oxford's 'Ancient History Dinners'
- Gertrud Herzog-Hauser (1894–1953), Austrian classical philologist; first Austrian woman to gain a habilitation at university and Vienna’s first university lecturer in classical language.
- James Higginbotham (1941–2014), Vera Brittain Visiting Fellow, professor of Linguistics and philosophy
- Dorothy Hodgkin OM FRS HonFRSC (1910–1994), Nobel Prize winner for her discovery of the structure of Vitamin B12 and development of protein crystallography; first, and only, British woman to win a Nobel Prize in science; first woman to receive maternity pay at Oxford University; first female Chancellor of the University of Bristol
- Alan Hollinghurst (1954), English novelist, poet, short story writer and translator, winner of the James Tait Black Memorial Prize and Booker Prize
- Margaret Hubbard (1924–2011), Australian-born British classical scholar specialising in philology; described as "one of the most distinguished classical scholars of the modern age"; one of St Anne's College's 15 founding fellows
- David Hutchinson FInstP (1969), quantum physicist
- Evelyn Jamison (1877–1972), medievalist
- Louise Johnson (1940–2012), biochemist and protein crystallographer; winner of the Suffrage Science award; part of the team that discovered the structure of the enzyme lysozyme
- Dame Carole Jordan (1941), physicist, astrophysicist, astronomer and academic; first woman President of the Royal Astronomical Society and one of the first female professors of astronomy in the UK
- Patricia Kingori, British Kenyan sociologist interested in misinformation and pseudoscience; included in the 2015 Powerlist; youngest black Oxbridge professor and the youngest woman to ever be awarded a full professorship at the University of Oxford
- Jane Kister (1944–2019), mathematical logician and executive editor of Mathematical Reviews
- Lotte Labowsky (1905–1991), exiled Jewish German classicist
- Aditi Lahiri (1952), India born German linguist
- Renaud Lambiotte, Belgian mathematician and physicist
- Claire Lamont (1942), specialist in the works of Jane Austen and Sir Walter Scott; winner of the Rose Mary Crawshay Prize
- Mary Lascelles (1900–1995), literary scholar
- Irene Lemos, classical archaeologist specialising in the Late Bronze Age and Early Iron Age of Greece
- Chris Lintott (1980), astronomer
- Mary Lobel (1900–1993, librarian), historian who edited several volumes of the Victoria County History
- Michael Lodge, Secretary-General of the International Seabed Authority
- Emily Lorimer (1881–1949), Anglo-Irish journalist, linguist, political analyst, and writer
- Hilda Lorimer (1873–1954), classical scholar; one of the first three women to participate in an excavation conducted by the British School at Athens
- Jonathan Marchini (1973), Bayesian statistician and professor of statistical genomics
- Faith Martin (secretary), pen name of English author Jacquie Walton best known for her detective series
- Andrea G. McDowell, American Egyptologist
- Lois McNay, political theorist
- Anita Mehta, Indian physicist
- Dame Anna Morpurgo Davies (1937–2014), Italian philologist
- Natalia Nowakowska (1977), historian of late medieval and Renaissance Europe
- Hilary Ockendon, applied mathematician and an expert on problems in fluid dynamics
- Daphne Osborne (1930–2006), botanist
- Patricia Owens (1975), British-Irish academic, author and professor in International Relations
- L. P. E. Parker (1933-2026), classical scholar
- Clara Pater (1841–1910), language and literature scholar; pioneer and early reformer of women's education; tutor of Virginia Woolf
- Valerie Pearl (1926–1916), historian, President of New Hall, Cambridge
- Dame Emily Penrose (1858–1942), Principal of Royal Holloway College, Bedford College and Somerville College; first woman to gain a First in Greats (Classics) at Oxford
- Colin Phillips, psycholinguist
- Bertha Phillpotts (1877–1932), scholar in Scandinavian languages, literature, history, archaeology and anthropology
- Antoinette Pirie (1905–1991), biochemist, ophthalmologist, and educator
- Gita Piramal (1954), Indian writer and business historian
- Mildred Pope (1872–1956), scholar of Anglo-Norman England; first woman to hold a readership at Oxford University; the character Miss Lydgate in Sayers' Gaudy Night (1935) is based on Pope
- Mary Winearls Porter (1886–1980), crystallographer and geologist, known for her publications about ancient Roman architecture
- Mason Porter, American mathematician and physicist; winner of the Erdős–Rényi Prize and Whitehead Prize
- Tessa Rajak (1946), ancient historian, primarily focused on Judaism in the Hellenistic and Roman periods; expert on the writings of Josephus
- Tobias Reinhardt (1971), German classical scholar, specialising in Latin literature and ancient philosophy
- Stephen Roberts FREng, professor of machine learning
- Alex Rogers, professor of conservation biology
- Bridget Rosewell (1951), economist
- Peter Rutledge, New Zealand chemist
- Susan M. Scott, Australian physicist whose work concerns general relativity, gravitational singularities, and black holes; first female physicist to win the Prime Minister's Prize for Science
- Chehrzad Shakiban (1951), Iranian and American mathematician, the first Iranian woman to receive a Ph.D. in mathematics and the first Iranian woman to become a full professor of mathematics
- Rose Sidgwick (1877–1918), one of the founders of the International Federation of University Women
- Steven H. Simon (1967), American theoretical physicist; LeRoy Apker Award and Royal Society Wolfson Research Merit Award winner
- Mary Snow (1902–1978), botanist who contributed to the study of geotropism and phyllotaxis
- Iyiola Solanke, Professor of European Union Law; founded the Black Female Professors Forum
- Charles Spence (1969), experimental psychologist
- Fiona Stafford, Professor of English Language and Literature
- Phyllis Starkey (1947), Labour party politician
- Enid Starkie (1897–1970), Irish literary critic known for her biographical works on French poets; officer of the Legion of Honour
- Frances Stewart (1940), professor emeritus of development economics; daughter of Nicholas Kaldor
- Mary Stocks, Baroness Stocks (1891–1975), writer who was deeply involved in women's suffrage, the welfare state, and other aspects of social work
- Martin Suckling (1981), composer and violinist
- Dame Lucy Sutherland (1903–1980), Australian-born historian and head of Lady Margaret Hall, Oxford
- Rachel Tanner, immunologist; winner of the 'Women of the Future' Award for Science in 2019
- Jenny Teichman (1930–2018), Australian/British philosopher, writing mostly on ethics
- Rajesh Thakker (1954), Professor of Medicine
- Angela Vincent (1942), neuroscientist
- Timothy Walker (1958), botanist, Horti Praefectus (Director) of the University of Oxford Botanic Garden and Harcourt Arboretum
- Doreen Warriner (1904–1972), development economist, known chiefly for her role in rescuing refugees just before World War II
- Kevin Warwick (1954), engineer and Deputy Vice-Chancellor (Research) at Coventry University; known for his studies on direct interfaces between computer systems and the human nervous system; winner of the IET Mountbatten Medal, Ellison–Cliffe Medal and Golden Eurydice Award
- Stephen Weatherill (1961), professor of European law
- Dame Veronica Wedgwood (1910–1997), historian specializing in the history of 17th-century England and Continental Europe; winner of the James Tait Black Memorial Prize and the Goethe Medal; President of the English Association
- Jennifer Welsh (1965), Canadian researcher, writer and consultant; United Nations Secretary-General’s Special Adviser on the Responsibility to Protect
- Stephanie West, classical scholar
- Hilary Davan Wetton (1943), Senior Music Associate, conductor
- Deirdre Wilson (1941), linguist and cognitive scientist
- Rosemary Woolf (1925–1978), scholar of medieval literature
- Dorothy Maud Wrinch (1894–1976), mathematician and biochemical theorist; first female Lecturer in Mathematics at Oxford and first woman to receive an Oxford DSc
- Leonie Zuntz (1908–1942), German Hittitologist, included in The Black Book

=== Honorary fellows ===
Notable honorary fellows (excluding alumni) are Simon Russell Beale, Vijaya Lakshmi Pandit, Venkatraman Ramakrishnan, Nancy Rothwell, and Kiri Te Kanawa. Notable foundation fellows are Charles Powell, Baron Powell of Bayswater, and Wafic Saïd.

== Principals ==
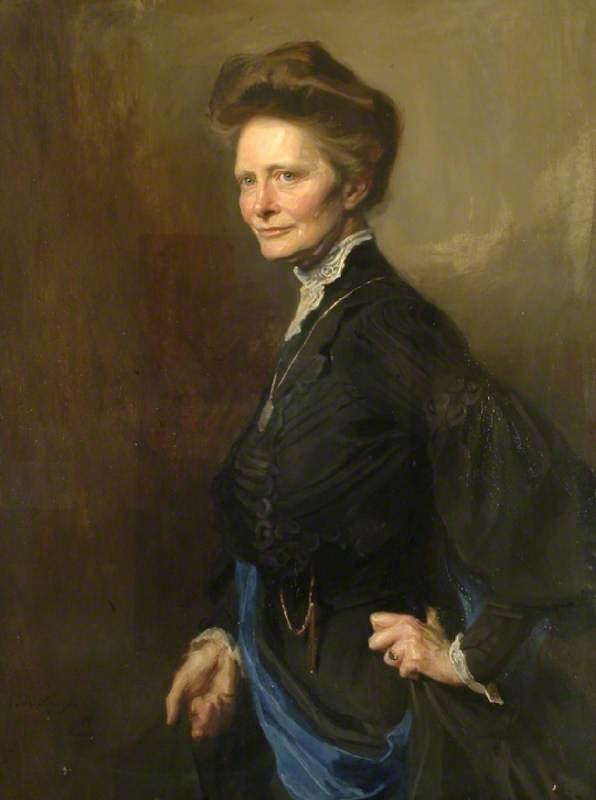
Emily Penrose

The first principal of Somerville Hall was Madeleine Shaw-Lefèvre (1879–1889). The first principal of Somerville College was Agnes Catherine Maitland (1889–1906) when in 1894 it became the first of the five women's halls of residence to adopt the title of 'college', the first of them to appoint its own teaching staff, the first to set an entrance examination, and the first to build a library. She was succeeded by classical scholar Emily Penrose (1906–1926), who established the Mary Somerville Research Fellowship in 1903 which was the first to offer women in Oxford opportunities for research. Alumnae Margery Fry (1926–1930), Helen Darbishire (1930–1945), Janet Vaughan (1945–1967), Barbara Craig (1967–1980) and Daphne Park, Baroness Park of Monmouth (1980–1989) also served as Principal of Somerville College.

The current principal is Catherine Royle. She succeeded Janet Royall, Baroness Royall of Blaisdon in October 2025.

== Rejected offers ==
Notable people who did not or could not accept an offer to study or conduct research at Somerville include Elizabeth Alexander, Christabel Bielenberg, Gertrude Elles, Emmy Noether, Olwen Rhys, Alison Settle, and Elisabeth de Stroumillo.
