= Greenham (disambiguation) =

Greenham is a village and civil parish in Berkshire, England.

Greenham may also refer to:

- RAF Greenham Common, former military airfield in Berkshire
- Greenham (surname)
- Greenham Stakes, horse race
- Greenham Barton, manor house in Somerset, England
- Greenham Lock, lock in Berkshire
