= Alice Bruce =

British educator and school administrator (1867–1951)

The Honourable Alice Bruce
- detail of portrait by Robert Duckworth Greenham
- Born: 29 April 1867; London, England
- Died: 4 November 1951 (aged 84); Oxford, England

Alice Bruce (29 April 1867 – 4 November 1951) was a British educator and school administrator. She was a long serving staff member of Somerville Hall, Oxford, and was President of Aberdare Hall in Cardiff.

== Life ==
Bruce was born in London in 1867. She was the youngest daughter of the eight children born to Henry Austin Bruce, first Baron Aberdare (1815–1895), and his second wife Nora Creina Blanche (born Napier). Her father had three children from his first marriage. She had a fine education ending with Bedford College and Somerville Hall in Oxford University. She graduated with a second class degree in history in 1890. In 1894 she returned to Somerville to become the secretary of Agnes Maitland.

When she retired from Somerville she was appointed as president of Aberdare Hall, Cardiff in 1929 and she served until 1936. (Her mother had been the founding President of the hall in 1883 and had served until 1895.) She took on other roles including becoming the vice-President of the Girls' Public Day School Trust.

Bruce died in Oxford in 1951 as an honorary fellow of Somerville Hall. Somerville owns a painting of Bruce by Robert Duckworth Greenham.
