= Greenham (surname) =

Greenham is a surname. Notable people with the surname include:

- Chris Greenham (1923–1989), English sound editor
- Dave Greenham (1889–1945), Australian rules footballer
- Fiona Greenham (born 1976), British field hockey player
- Grant Greenham (1954–2018), Australian archer
- Peter Greenham (1909–1992), British artist
- Richard Greenham (1535?–1594?), English clergyman
- Robert Duckworth Greenham (1906–1976), British artist
