= Aberdare Hall =

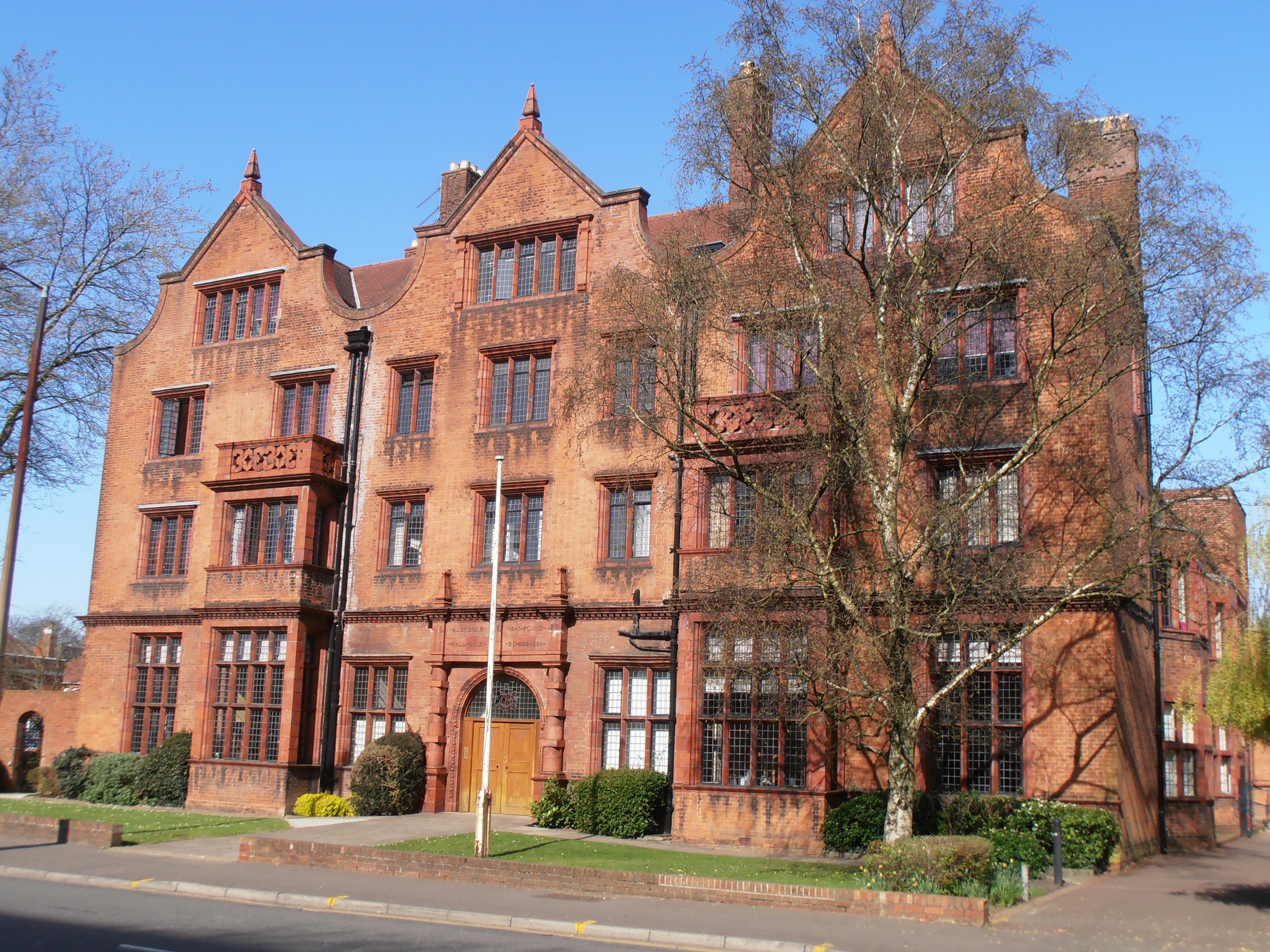
- Aberdare Hall

General information
- Type: Student residence
- Architectural style: Gothic Revival
- Location: Cardiff, Wales
- Coordinates: 51.489°N 3.184°W
- Completed: 1895
- Owner: Cardiff University

Design and construction
- Architect: W. D. Caröe

Website
- Aberdare Hall

Aberdare Hall (Welsh: Neuadd Aberdâr) is a Grade II-listed Gothic Revival hall of residence at Cardiff University in Wales. It was built at the end of the nineteenth century.

== History ==
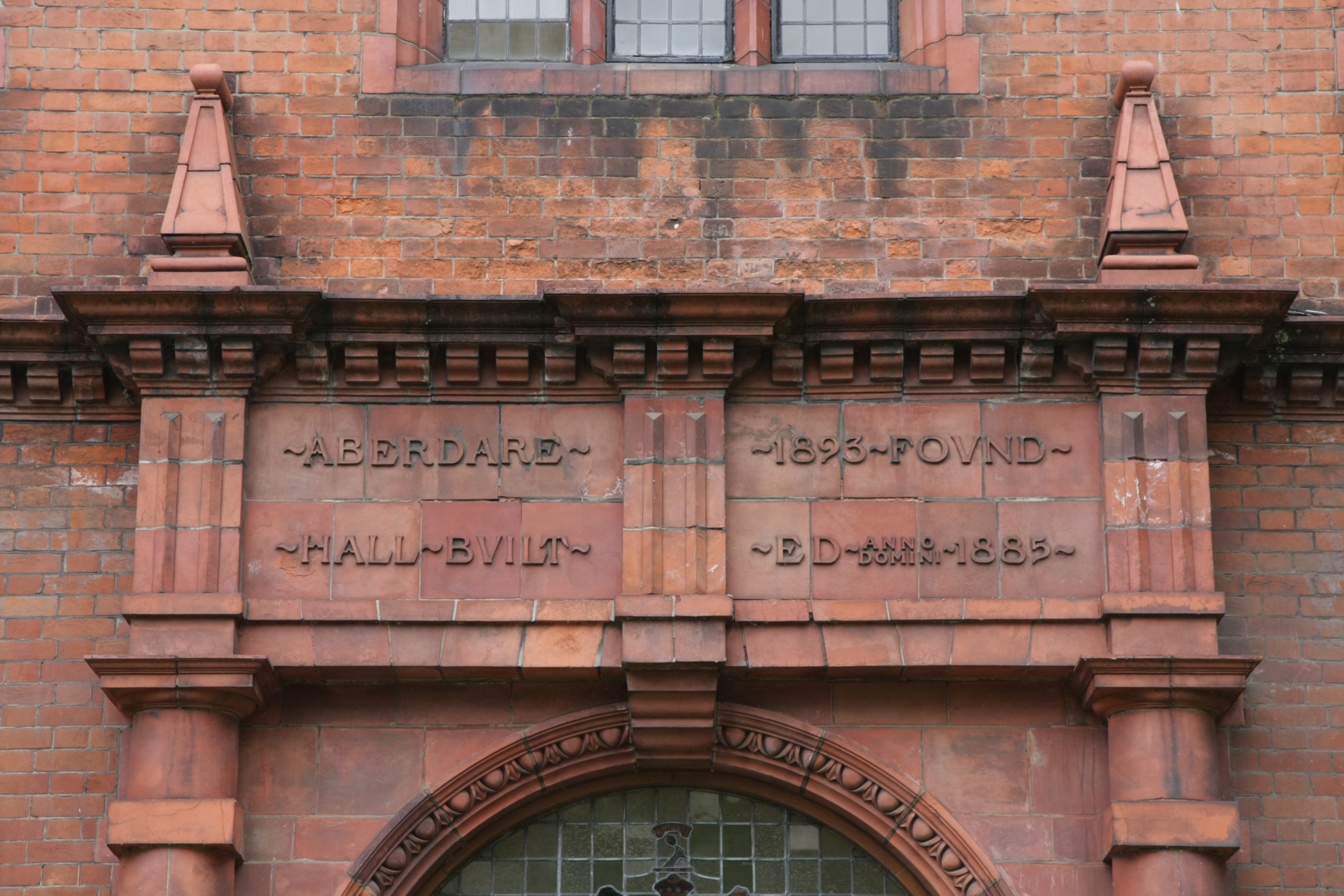
Commemorative plaque above main entrance

Aberdare Hall was established in 1883 by the University College of South Wales and Monmouthshire (later University College, Cardiff, now Cardiff University) as a residence for female students. Its foundation was due to the efforts of Lady Aberdare (1827–1897) (the wife of Henry Bruce, 1st Baron Aberdare) and John Viriamu Jones (1856–1909), the principal of the University College. There were few opportunities for women's higher education in Britain at the time.

The first building was Keswick House in Richmond Road, which opened in 1885 with nine students. The first two principals were Isabel Bruce, daughter of Lady Aberdare, and Isabel Don. Later principals included Ethel Hurlbatt. The current building was built 1893–1895 and was designed in the Gothic revival style in brick and terracotta by W. D. Caröe. Ethel Hurlbatt became the principal of Bedford College in the University of London in 1898. The next principal was Kate Hurlbatt who was Ethel's younger sister. She served for more than thirty more years until she retired in 1934.

The original Corbett Road facade was asymmetic and a third gable was added after 1908 to make it symmetrical. More additions were made to the rear of the building in the early twentieth century. The library wing to the north-east designed by Verner O. Rees was built in 1939–40, and the garden wing designed by Verner Rees, Laurence and Mitchell in 1963. Alice Bruce who was the daughter of the founder and a leading educationalist was the President of the hall from 1929 to 1936.

== Location ==
Aberdare Hall is in Corbett Road in Cathays Park, near to the Cathays district of Cardiff. It is the closest hall of residence to the main university buildings.
