= Villa Latomia =

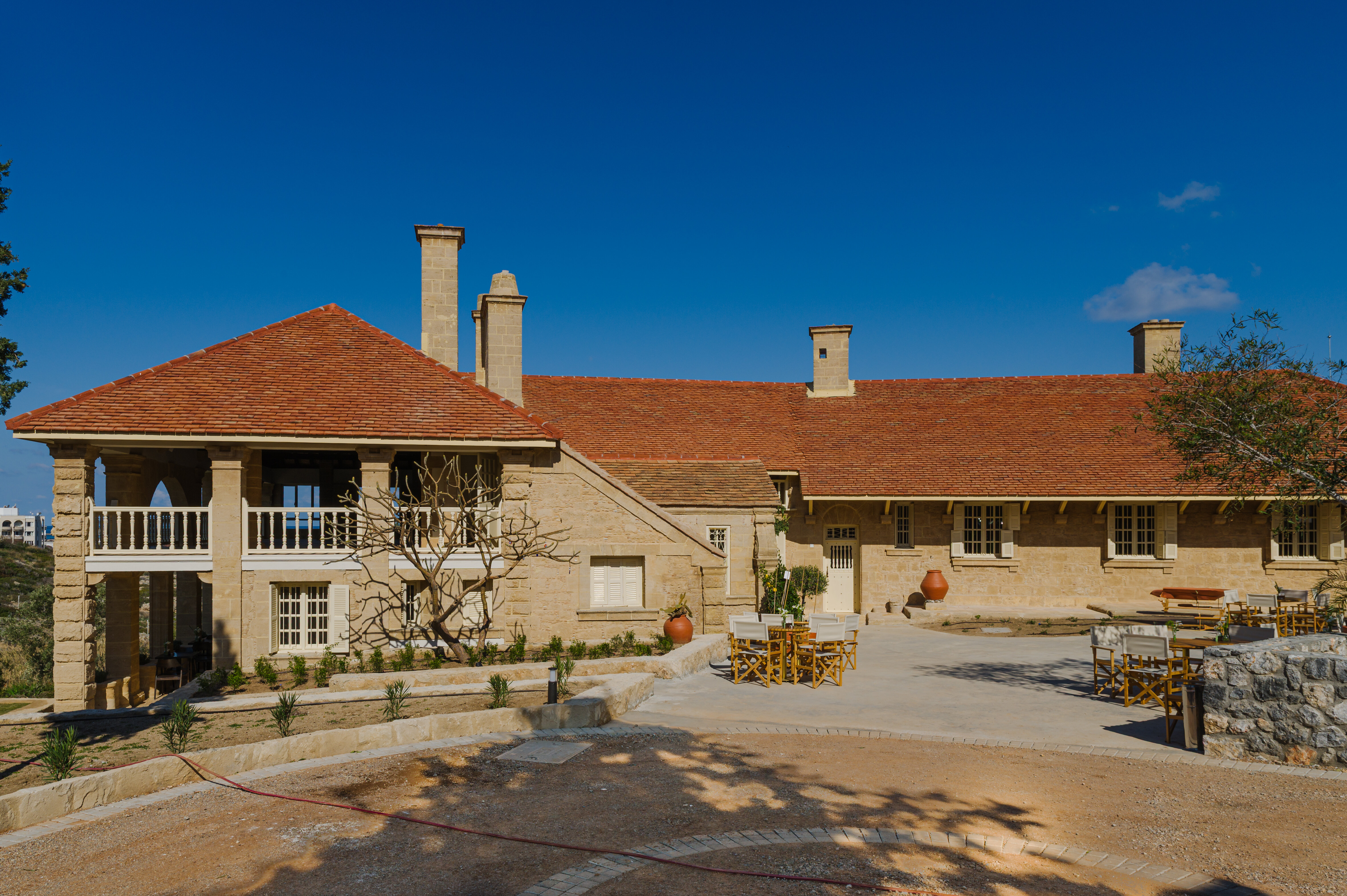

General information
- Location: Kyrenia, Northern Cyprus (de facto)
- Year built: 1933
- Renovated: 2022

Design and construction
- Architect: W. D. Caröe

Villa Latomia is a historical building located in Kyrenia in Northern Cyprus. It was designed and built in 1933 by the English architect William Douglas Caröe as his winter residence. Caröe died there in 1938, aged 80.

Sandstone sourced from the Latomia quarries, from where the villa takes its name, was used in its construction.

The villa served as the Fine Arts Museum of Northern Cyprus between 1974 and 2010. It remained unused between 2010 and 2022. After the restoration work initiated in 2022 was completed, it reopened in 2025. Restored in accordance with its original form, it began serving both as a cultural and arts centre and as a café operated by a private business.

== Architecture ==
Villa Latomia was designed in accordance with the architectural principles of the English Arts and Crafts movement, emphasizing craftsmanship and the use of traditional materials.

The building features a three-wing plan and is constructed on a projection overlooking the sea. The west wing consists of the main entrance, a living room, and a dining room. The east wing houses four bedrooms, while the north wing includes the kitchen and auxiliary spaces. The roof system is composed of pitched hipped roofs supported by carved wooden beams.

The exterior face is clad with sandstone blocks extracted from the Latomia quarries. Above the entrance, there is a pediment inscribed with the word "LATOMIA" and the date MCMXXXIII (1933). Wide eaves with wooden cladding rest on stone cornices, and ventilation openings are featured on the roofs of the east and north wings. The west wing has a large veranda supported by stone columns.

=== Interior ===
The interior is shaped with stone craftsmanship and wooden details. At the centre of the building, there is a large fireplace, described as an inglenook. Inscriptions in French, Latin, and Greek are engraved above the fireplace. The building features ornate wooden panels, arched transitions, and large windows in various sections.

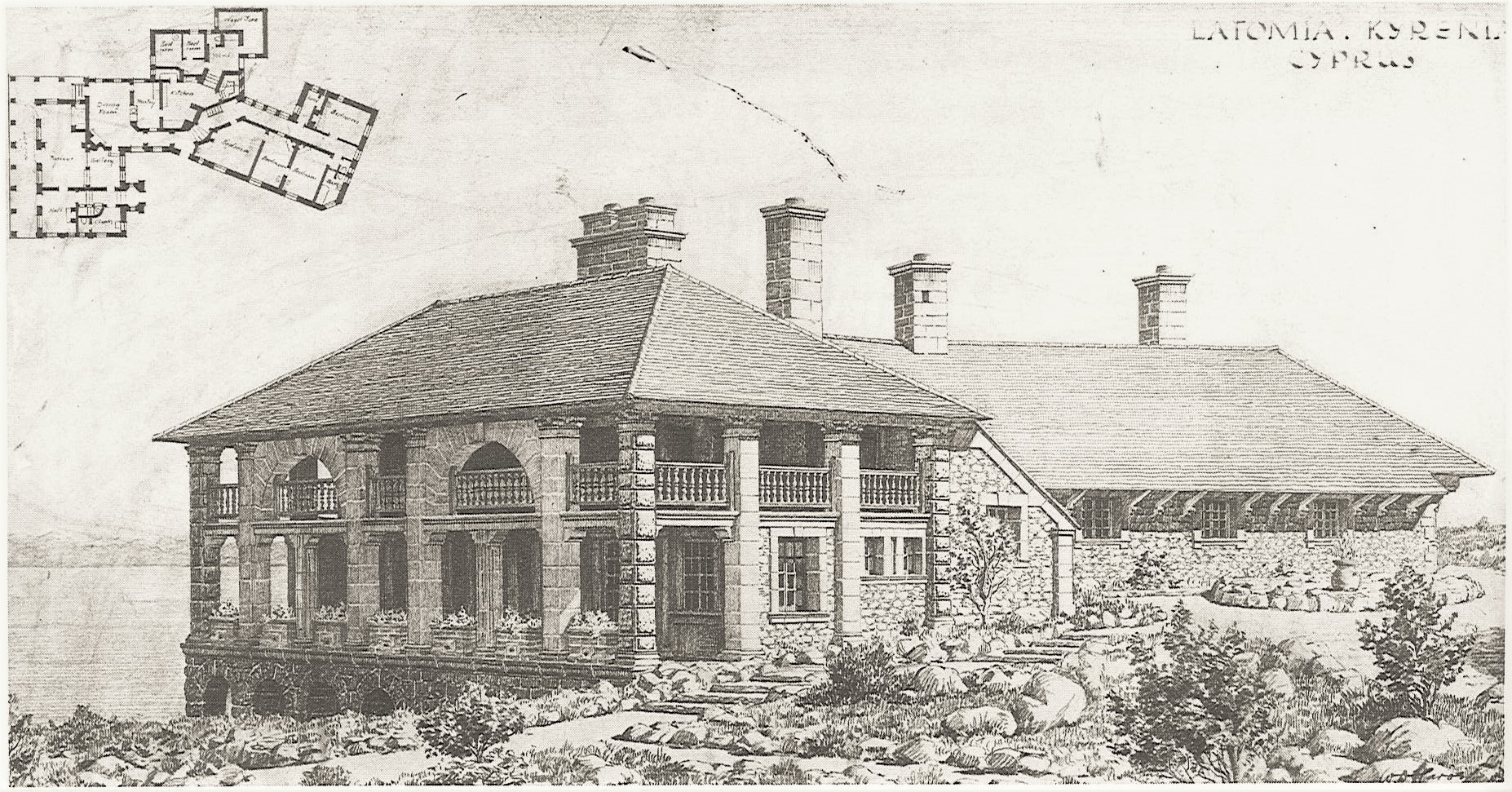
Caröe's perspective drawing of Villa Latomia with an inlaid plan

The living room and dining room feature wooden ceiling decorations and carved furniture. The arched corridor leading to the bedrooms is directed towards the exterior with large window openings. The interior includes various architectural details, such as ironwork, carved wardrobes, and stone wall decorations.

The ironwork, carpentry, and furniture in the building were designed by Caröe and produced by local craftsmen.

== Fine Arts Museum ==
After the 1974 Turkish invasion of Cyprus, the villa was preserved as one of the examples of British Colonial-era civil architecture in Cyprus and transferred to the Department of Antiquities and Museums.

Artworks collected from Fieros, an antique dealer in Kyrenia, and from a shop next to the Dome Hotel were moved to the villa, and in 1975, it was opened to the public under the name Fine Arts Museum. The museum displayed oil paintings, works of Far Eastern art, and various objects reflecting European porcelain craftsmanship.

In 2010, the museum was closed, and the artworks were relocated to other places.

== Gallery ==
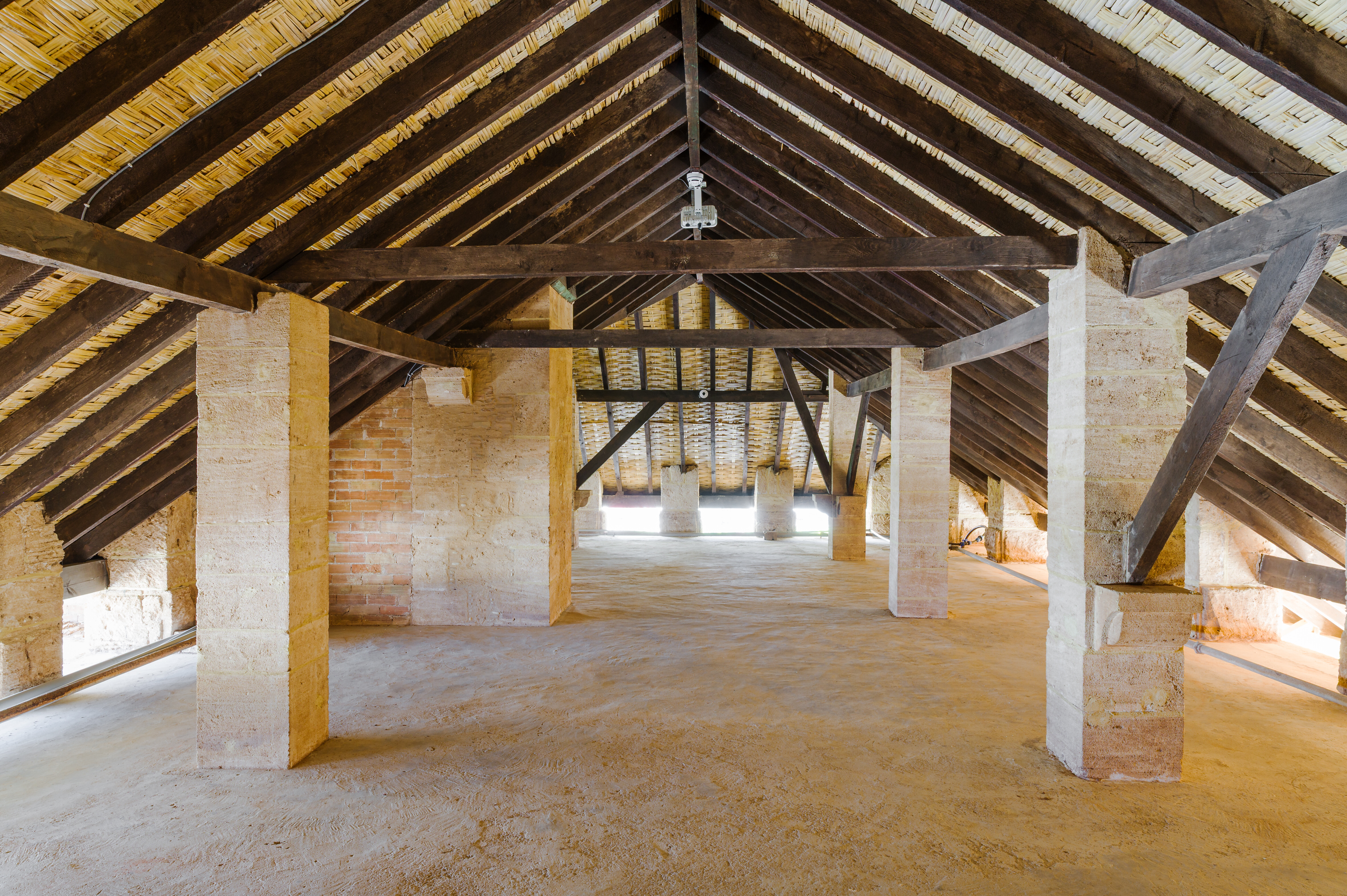
Attic floor of the restored building.

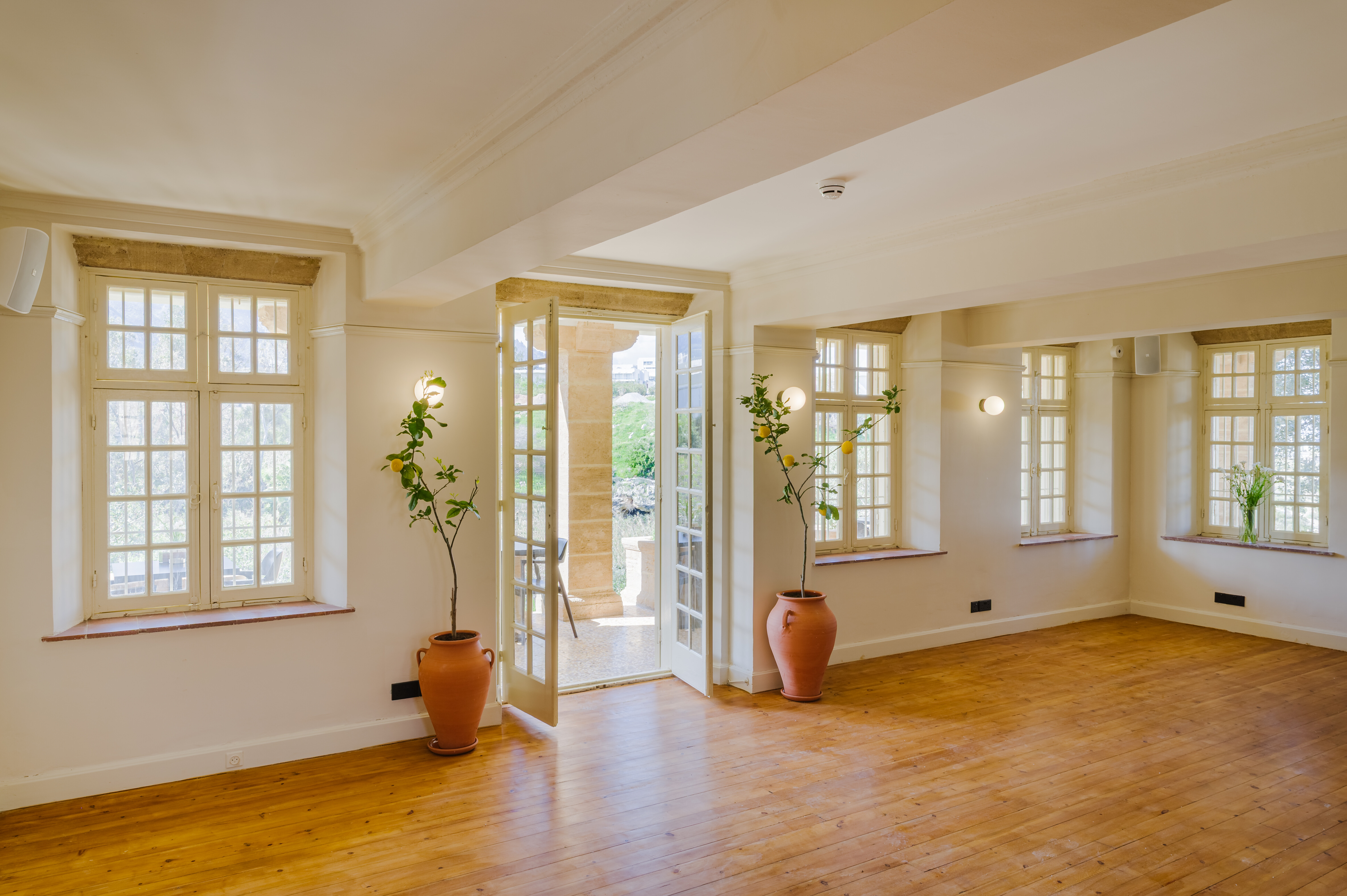
Door to the hall balcony.

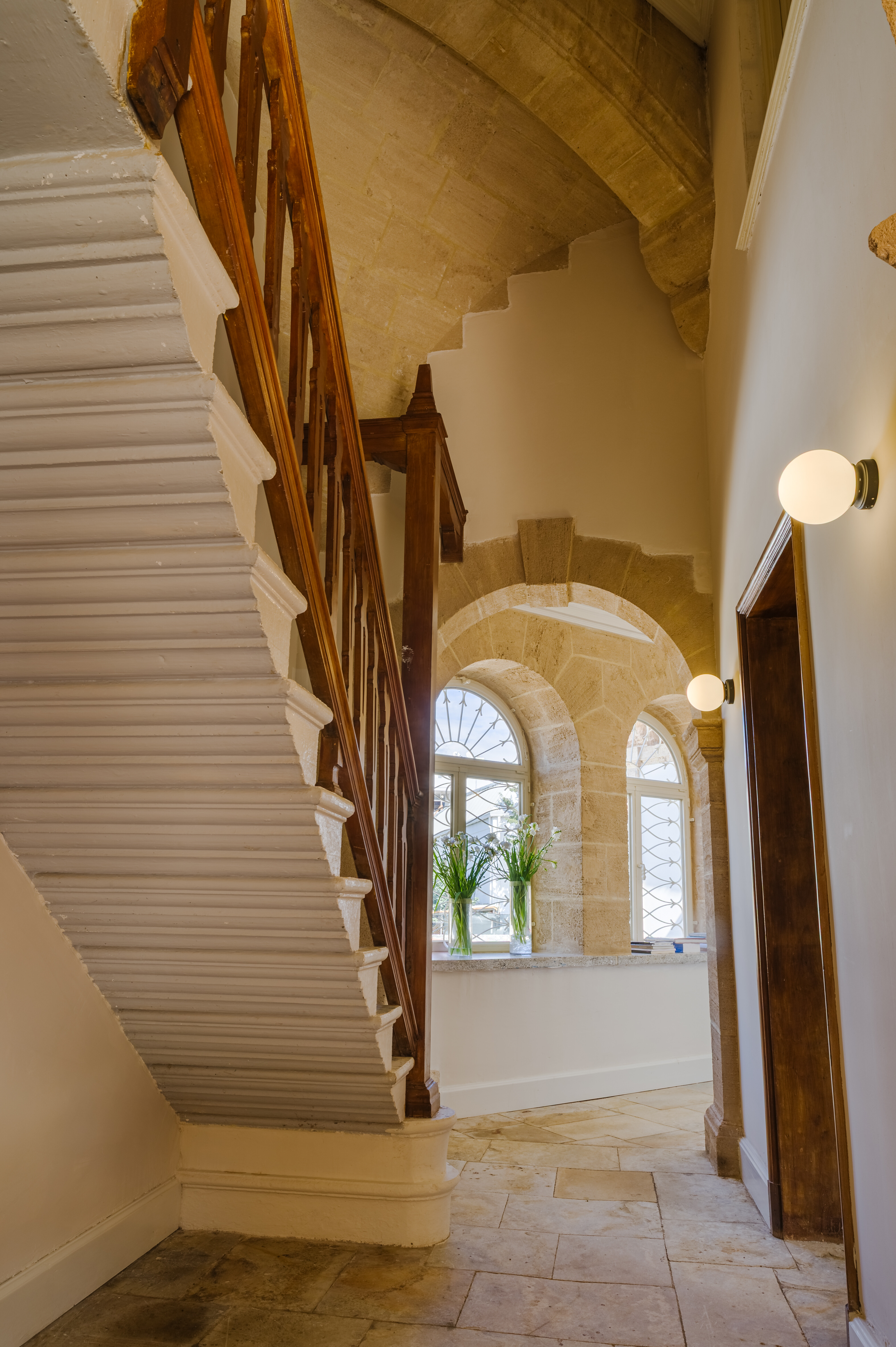
Entrance to the east building hallway.

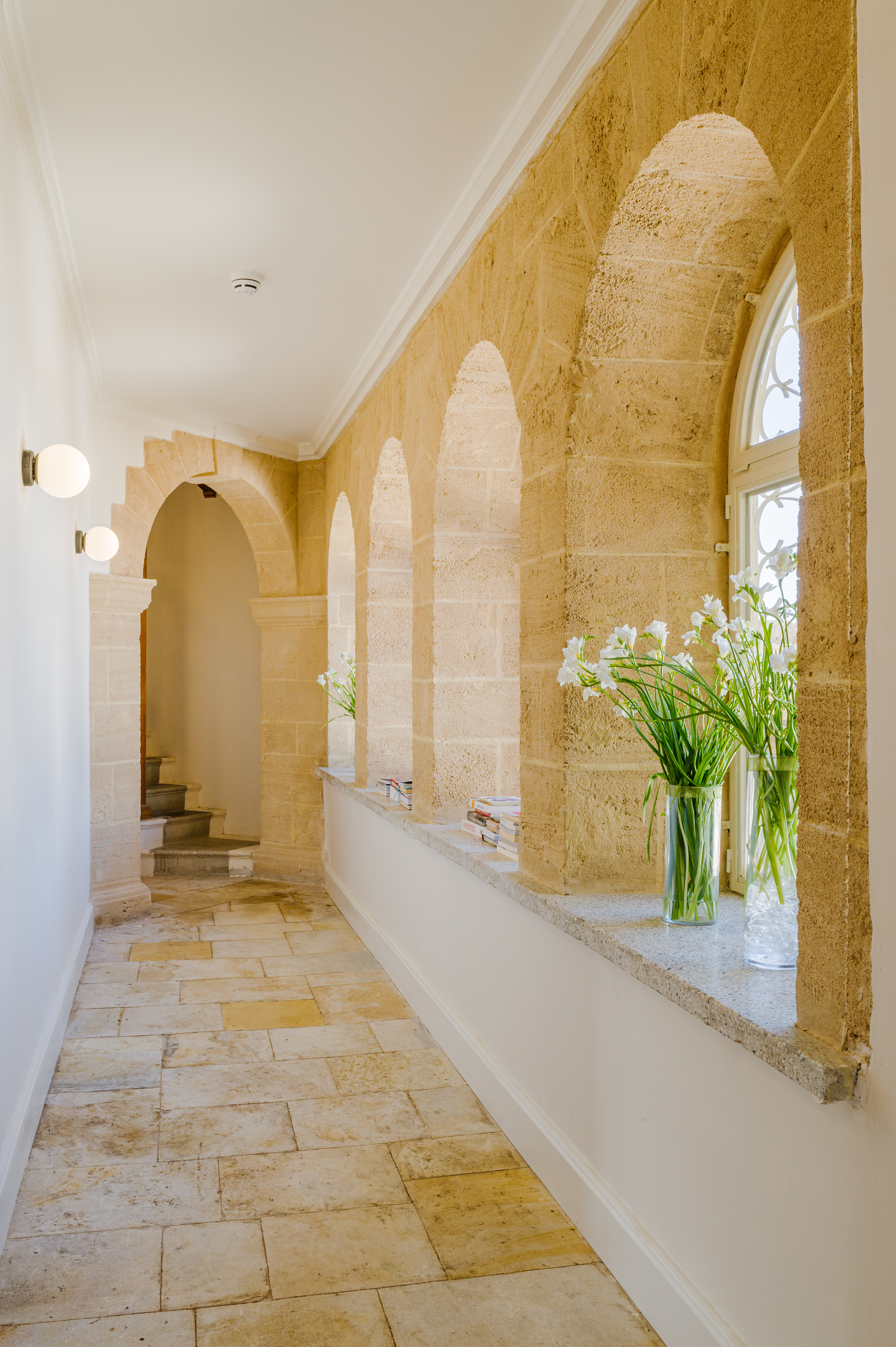
Interior hallway in the east building.

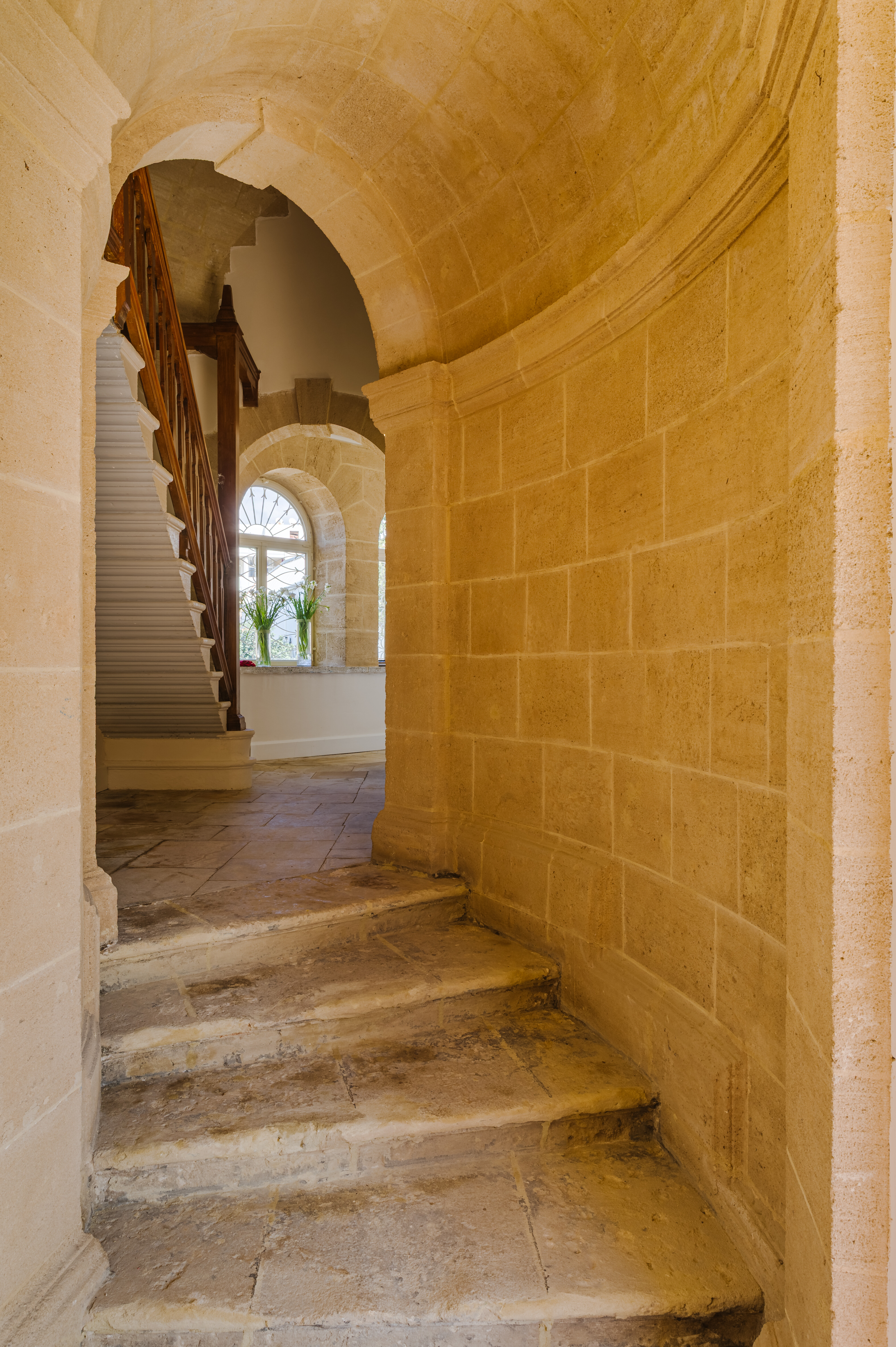
Stairs within the east building.

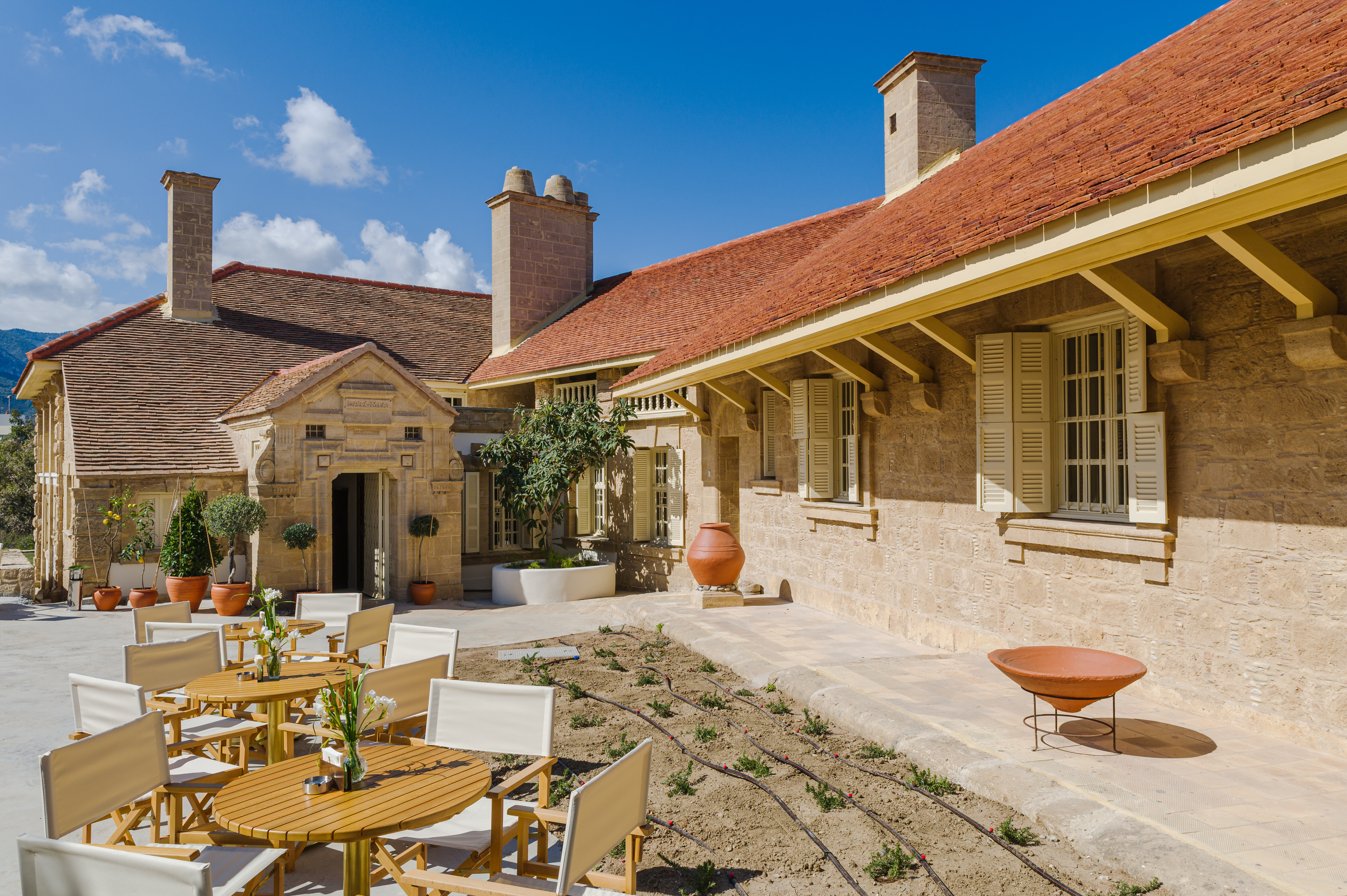
Exterior of the east building.

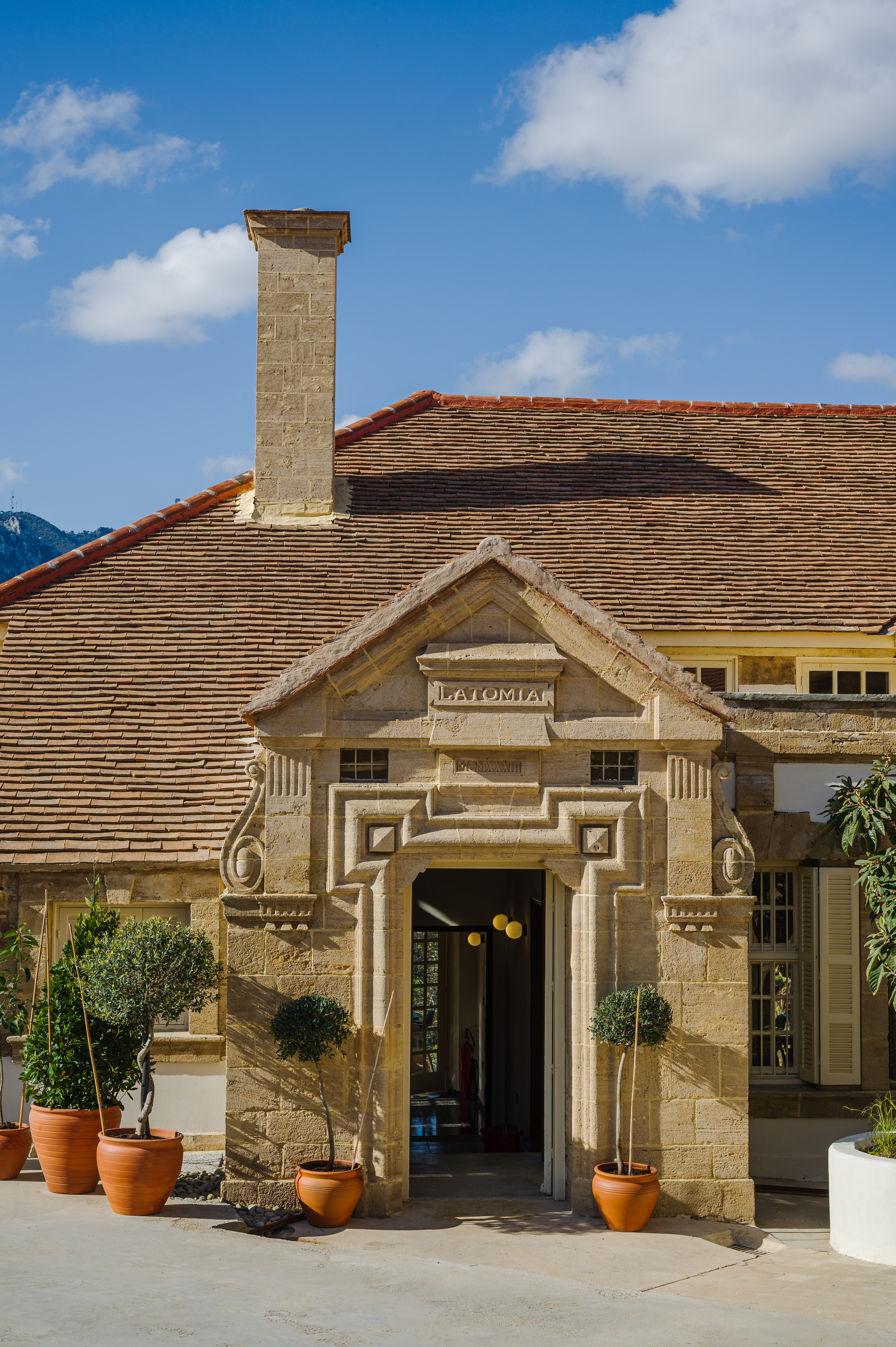
Restored historic entrance gate.

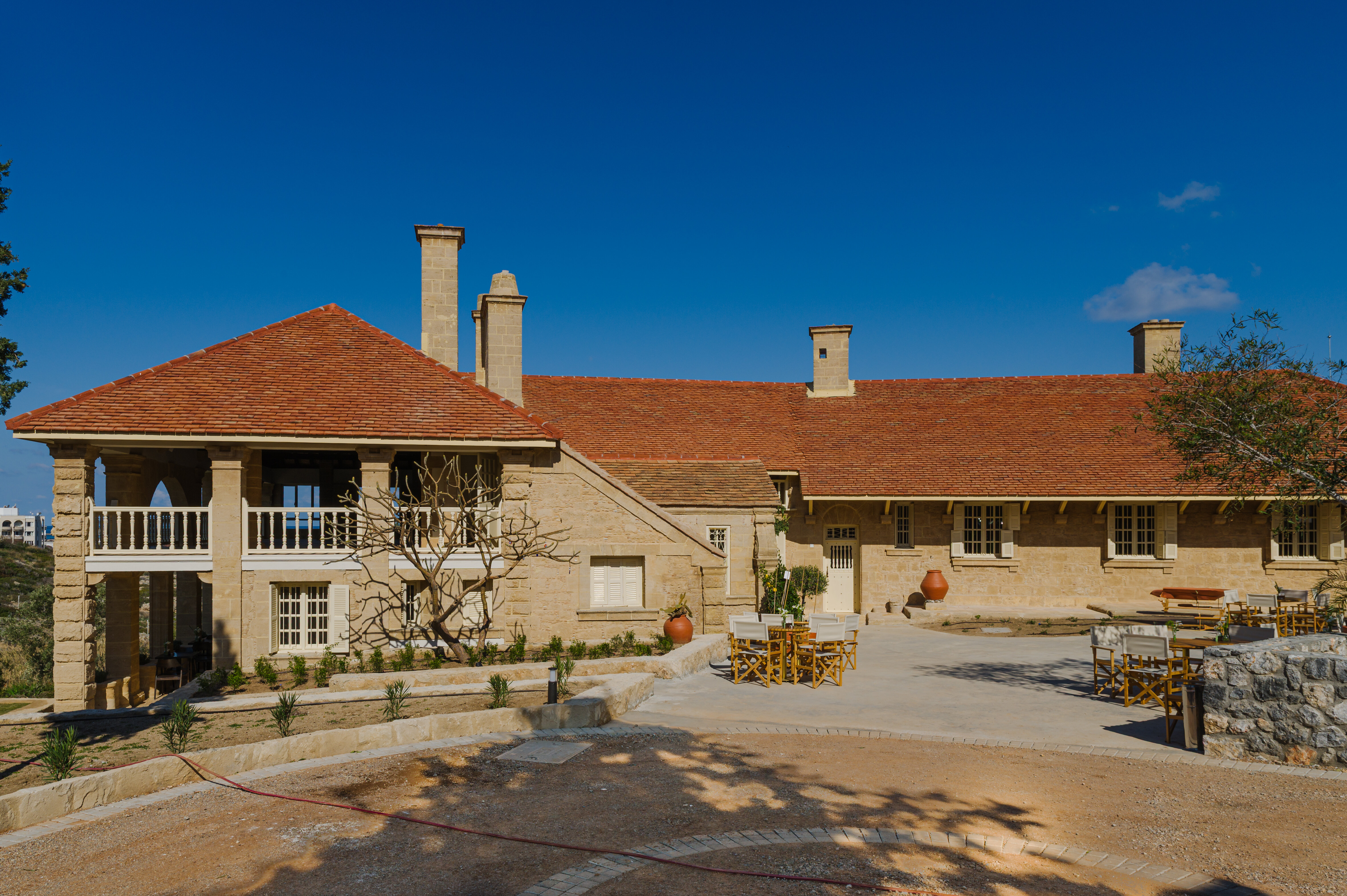
General exterior view of the structure.

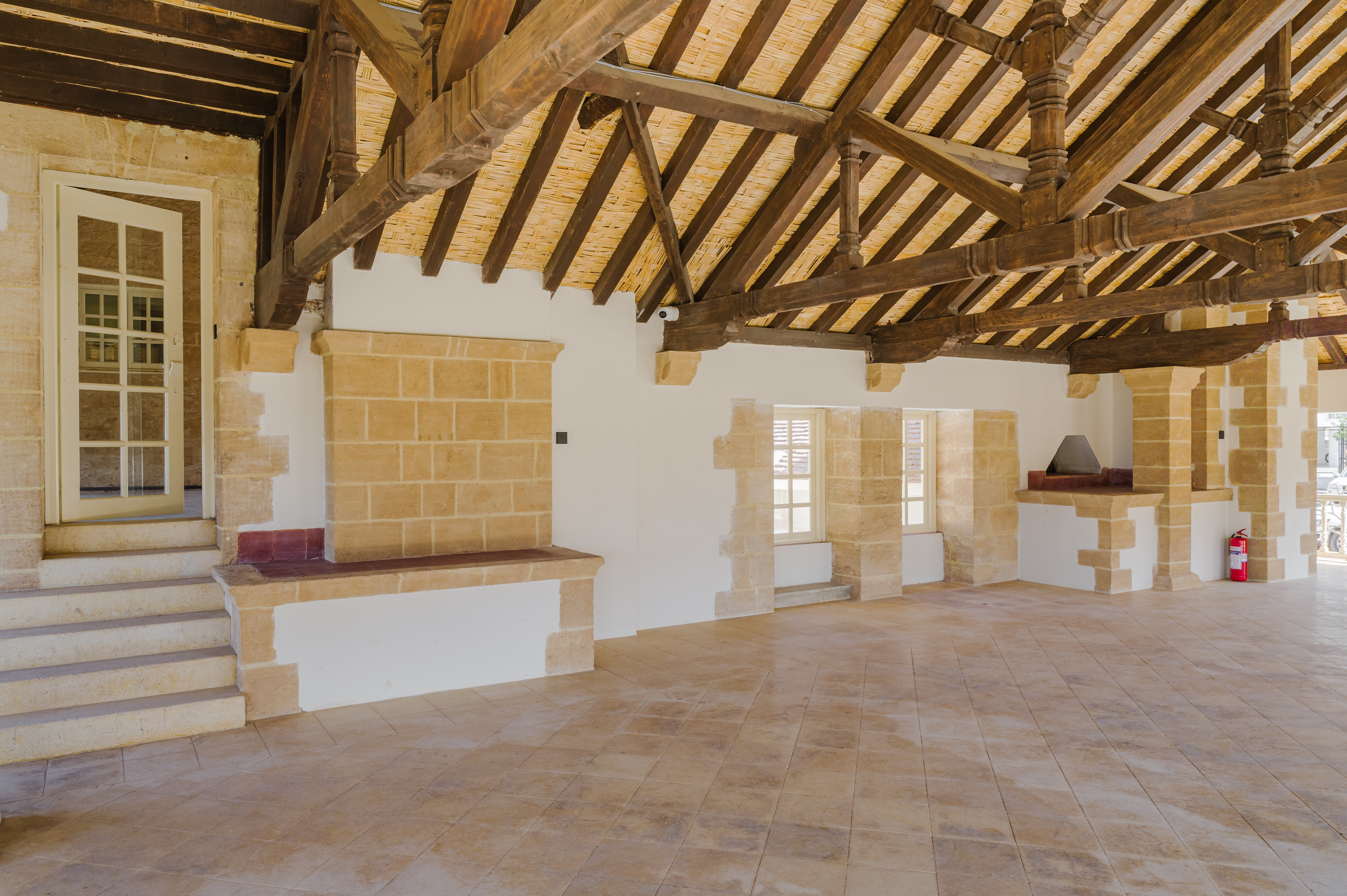
Glazed terrace section.

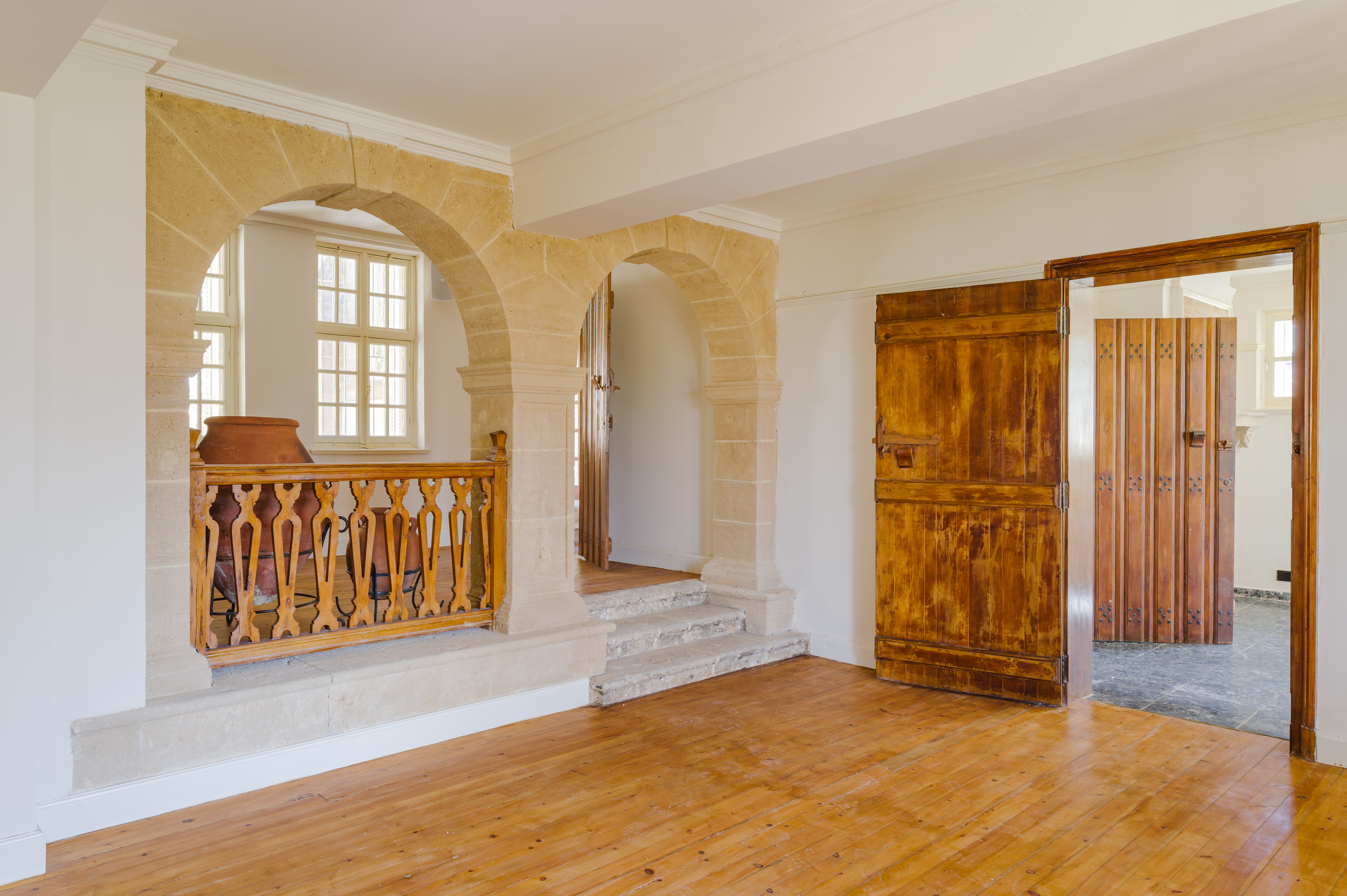
Main hall entrance area.

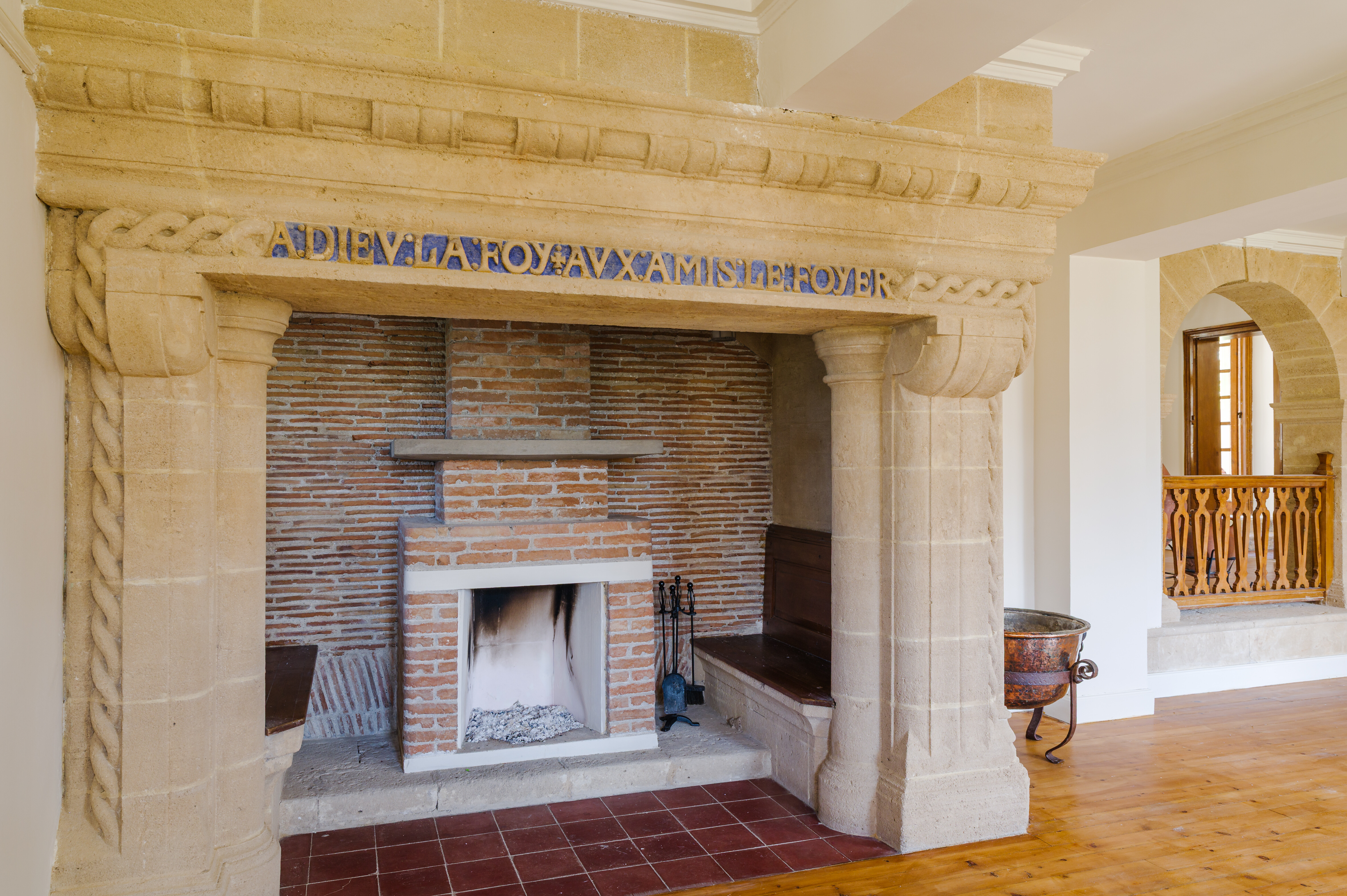
Hearth located in the main hall.

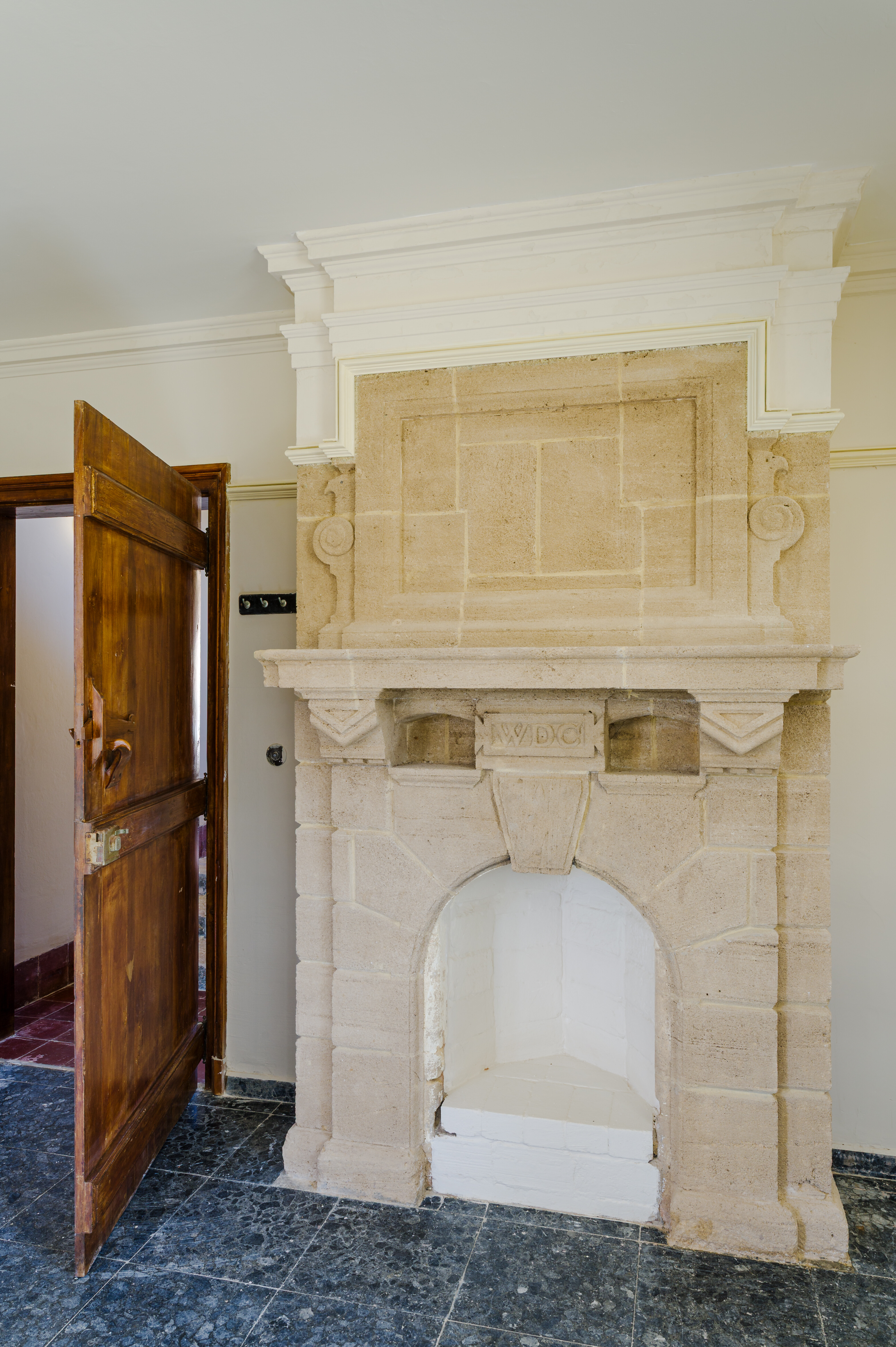
Vertical view of the hearth.

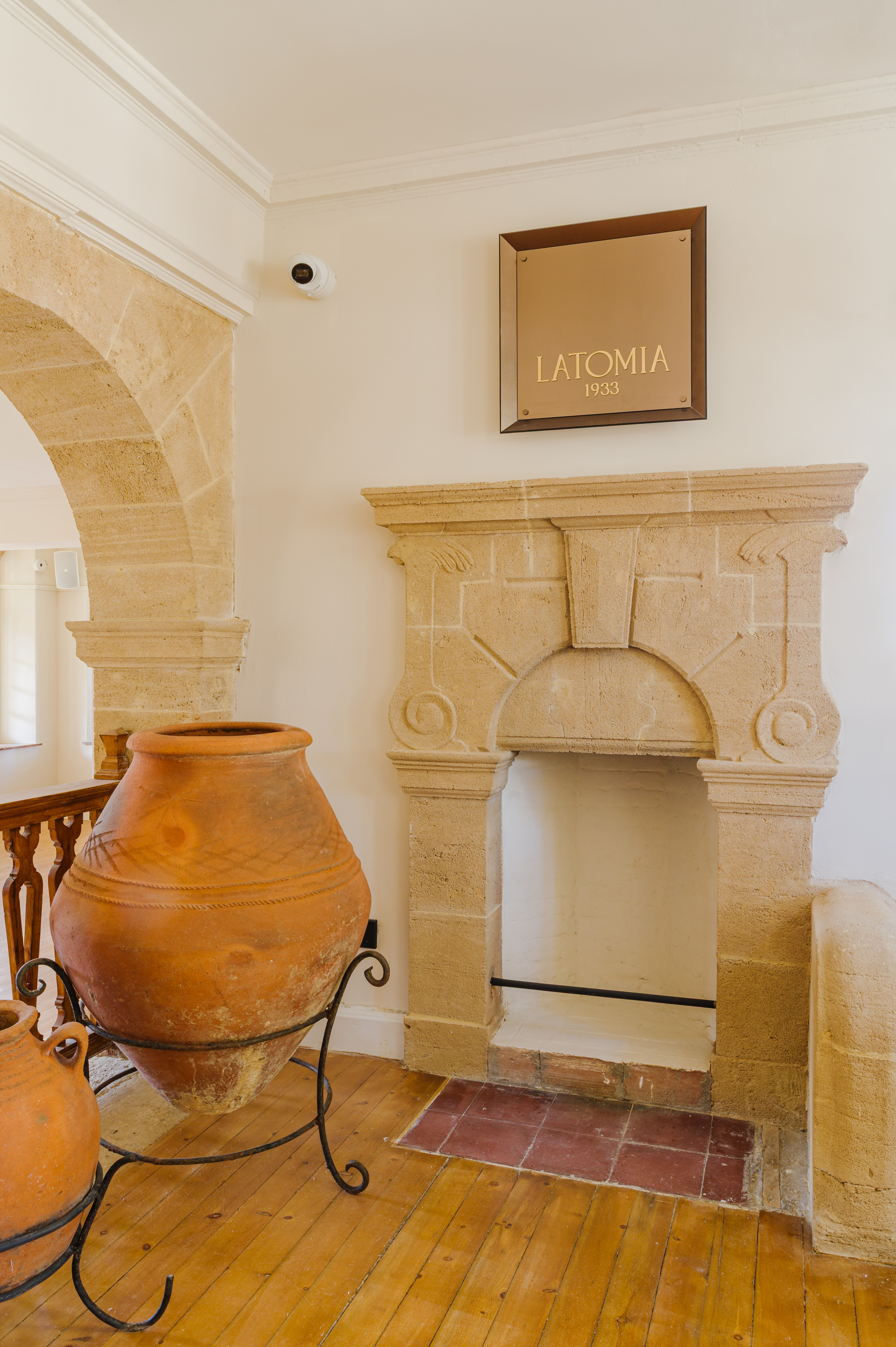
Another angle of the hearth.

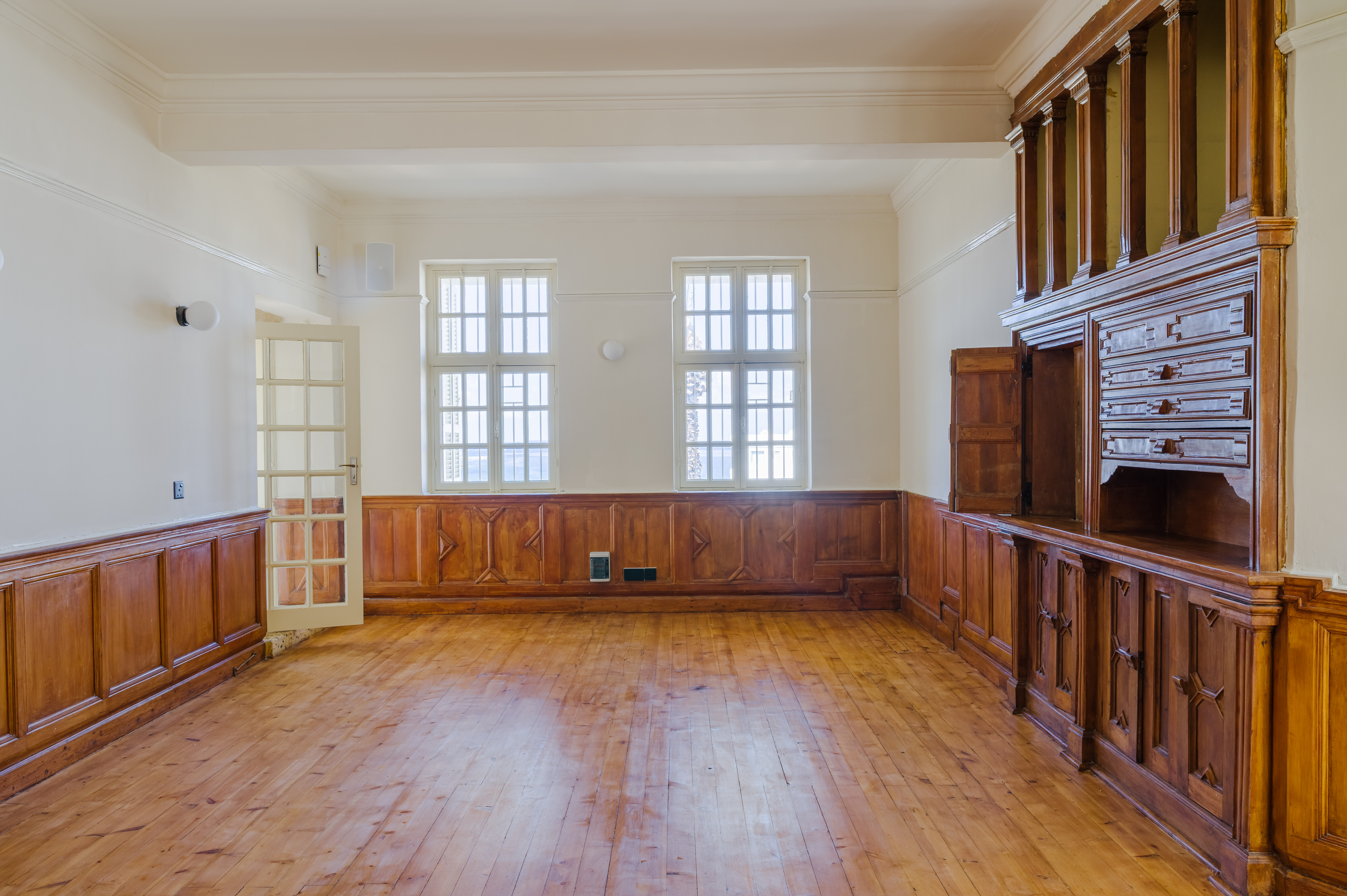
Restored kitchen area.

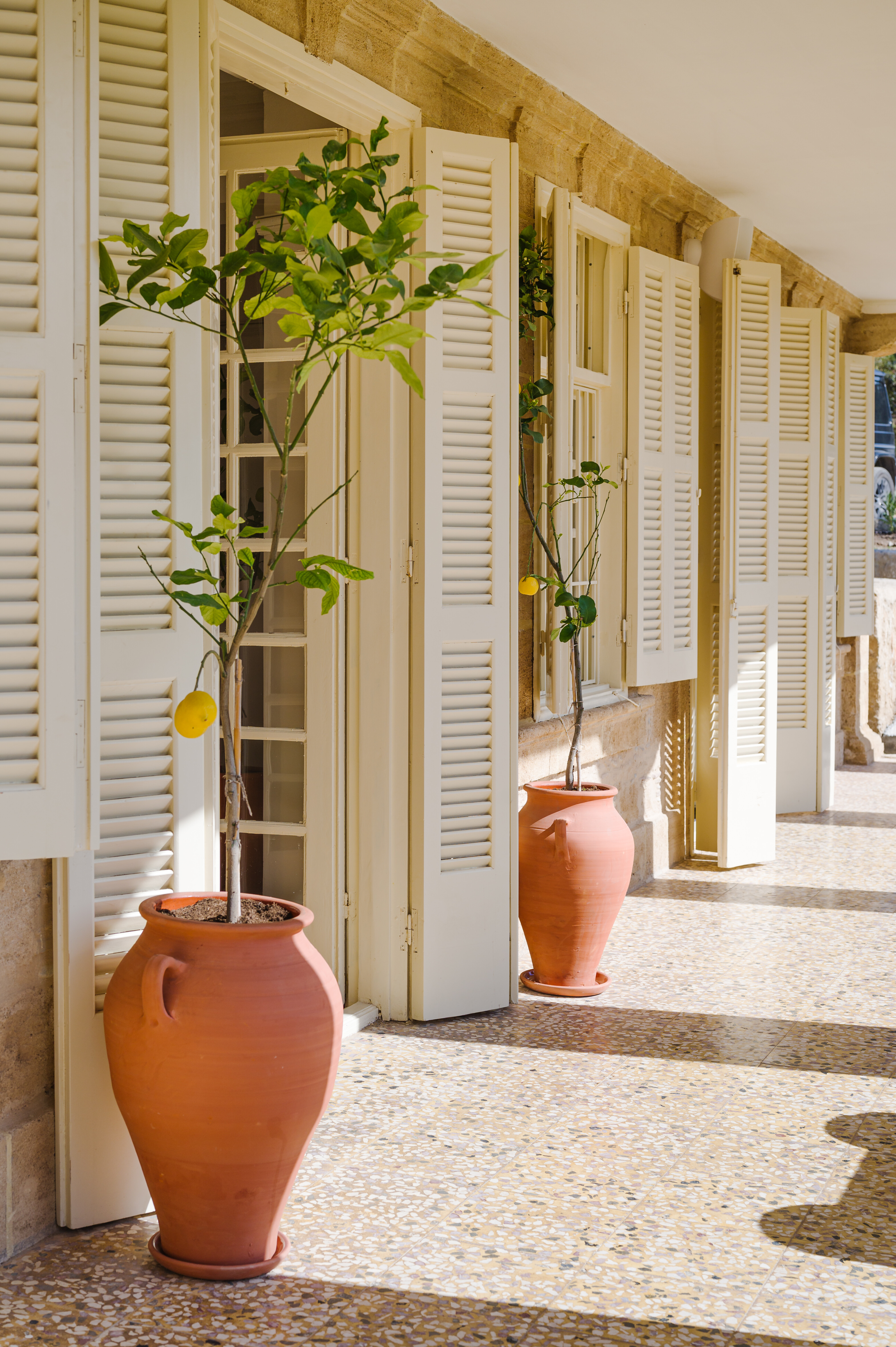
Outside balcony area of the structure.

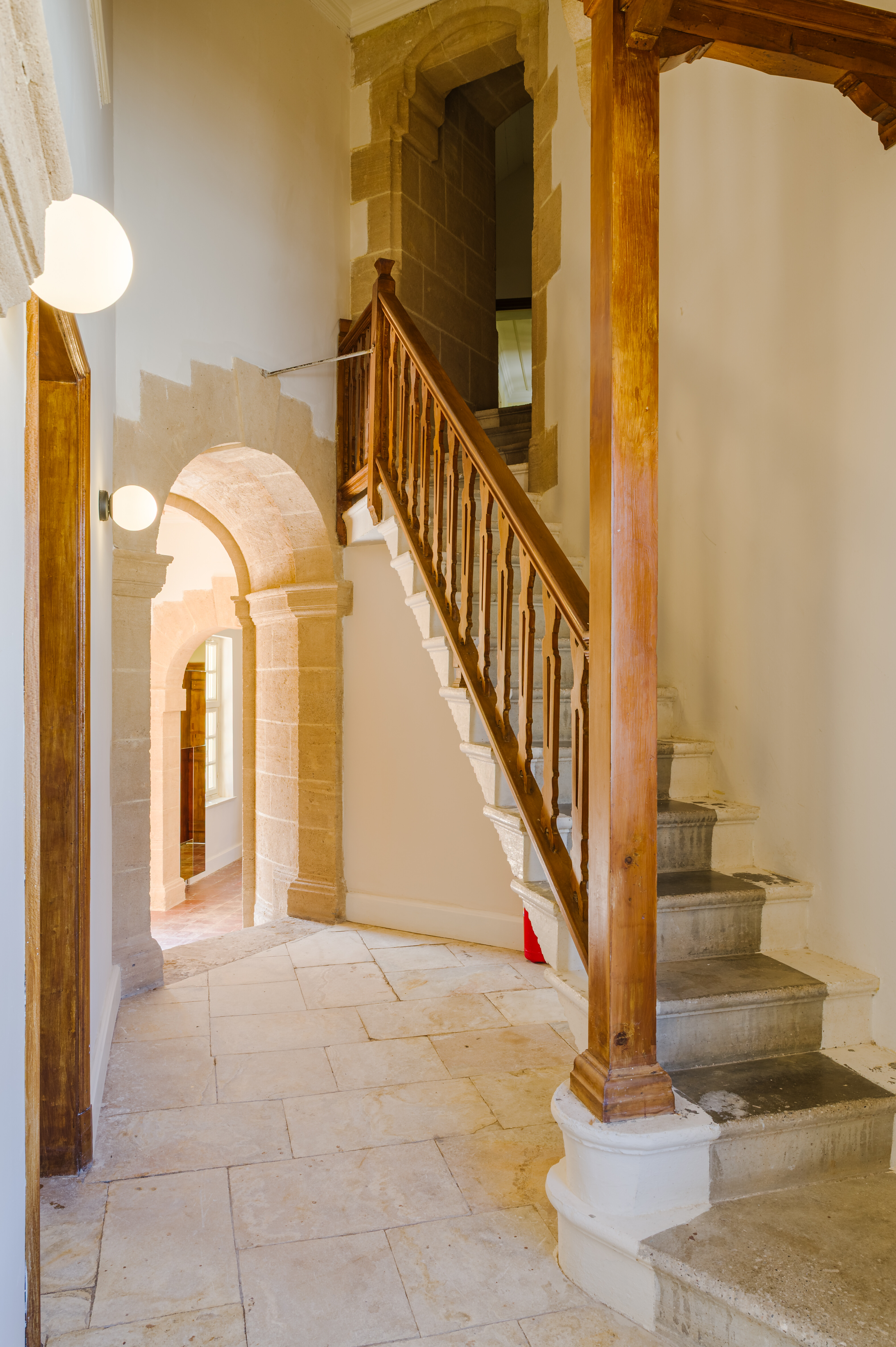
Staircase leading to the upper floor.

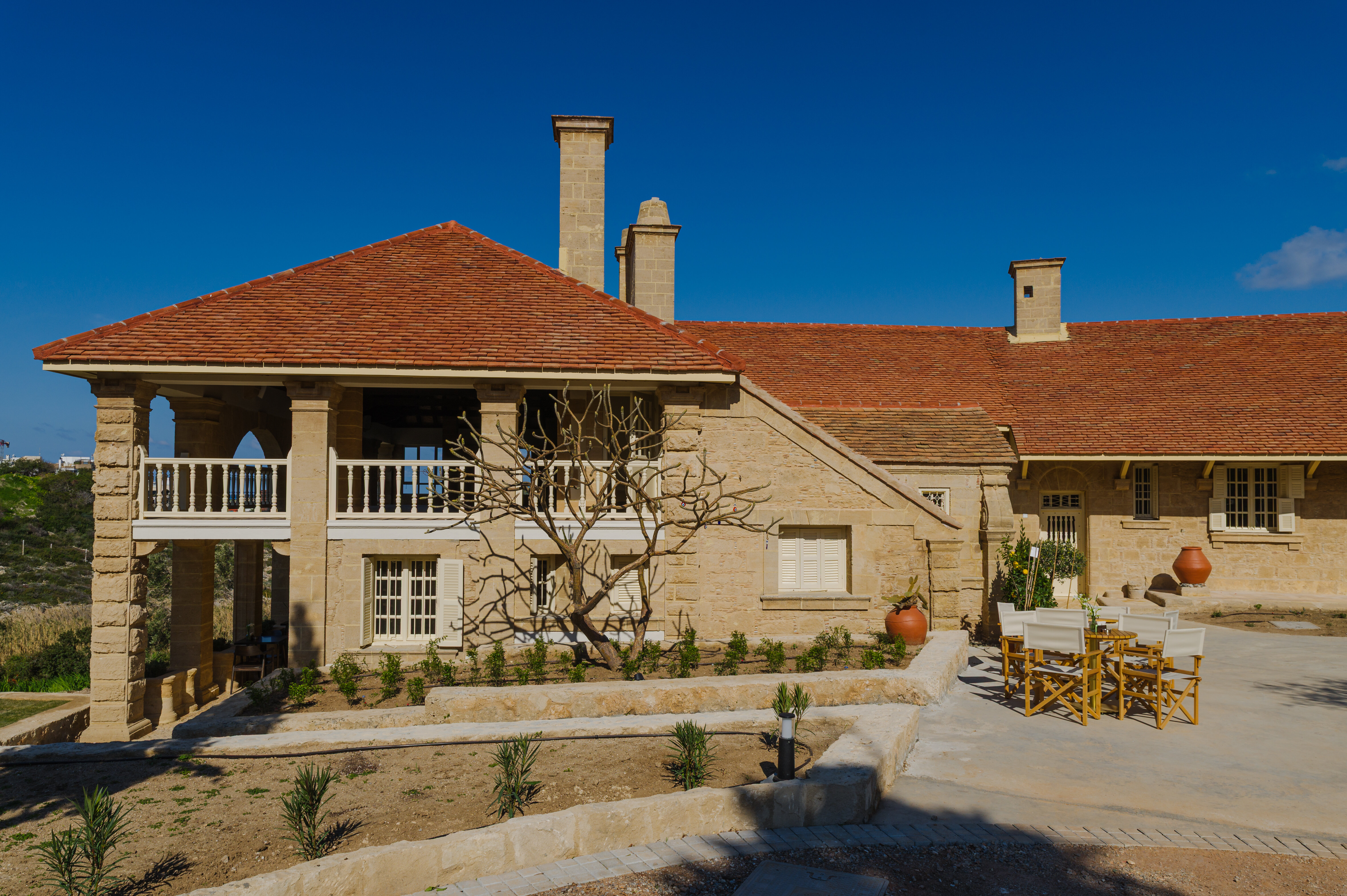
View of the western building from the entrance road.

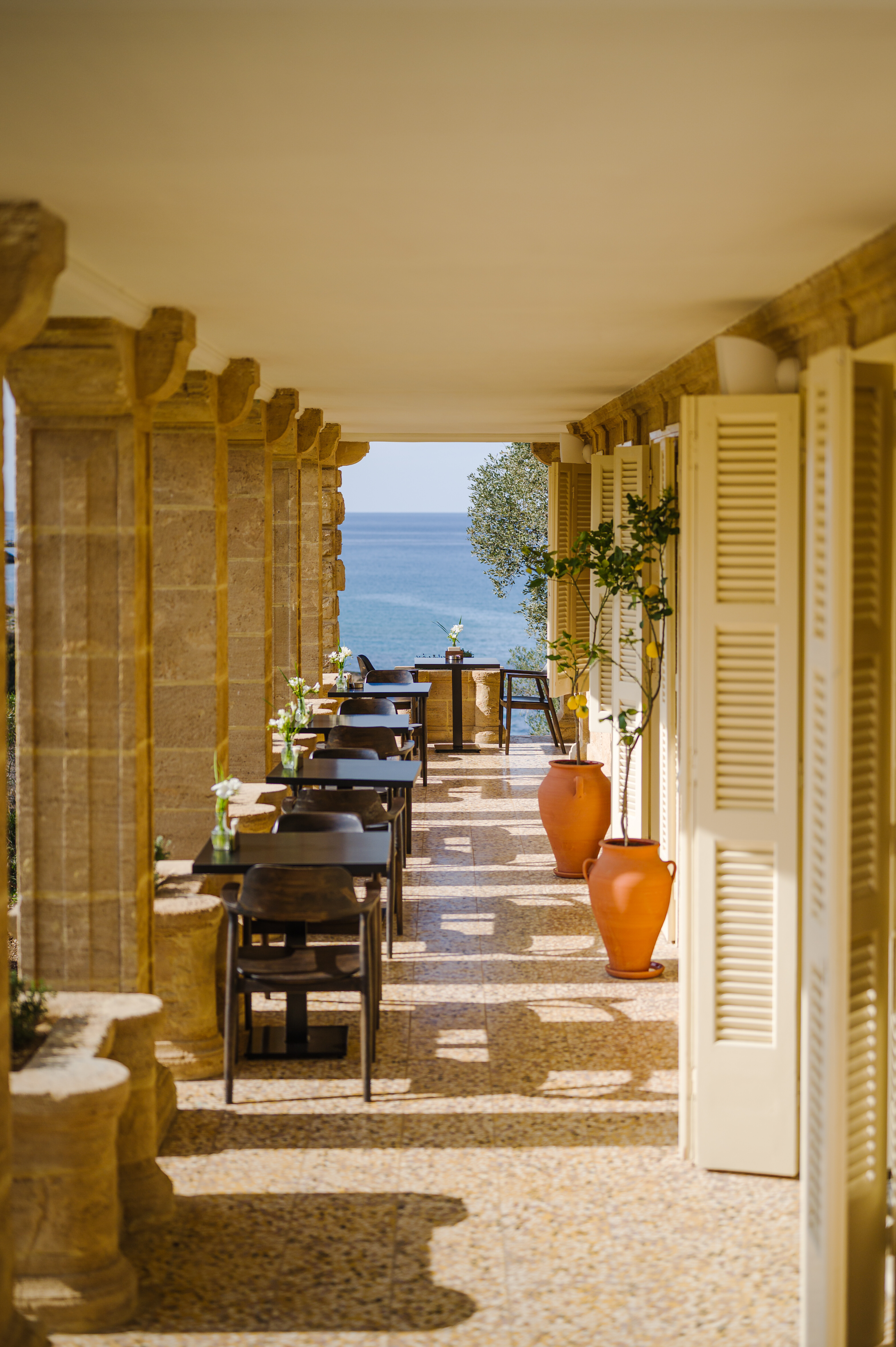
Western building’s outside balcony.

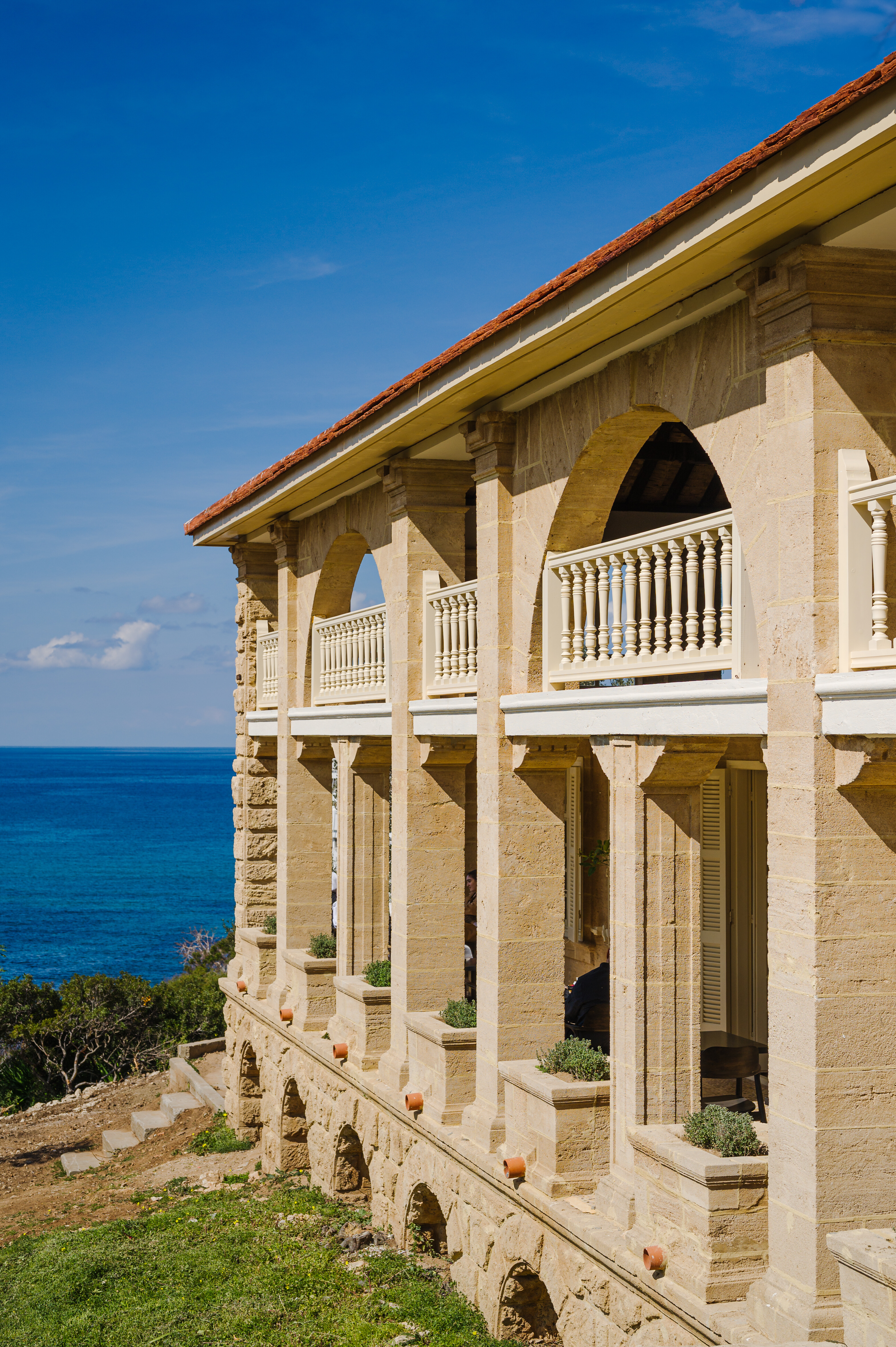
Terrace and balcony of the west building.

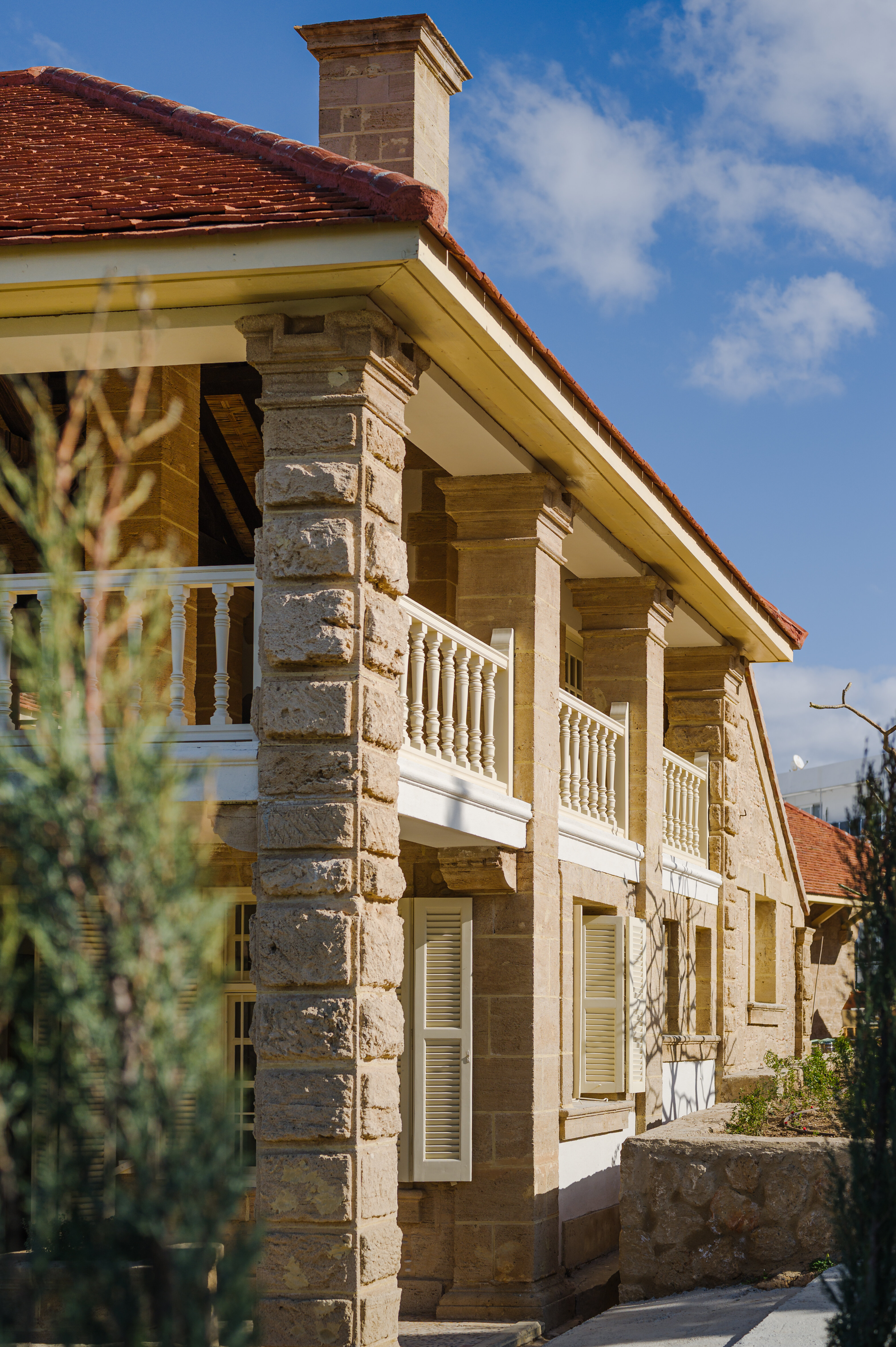
Full view of the western building.

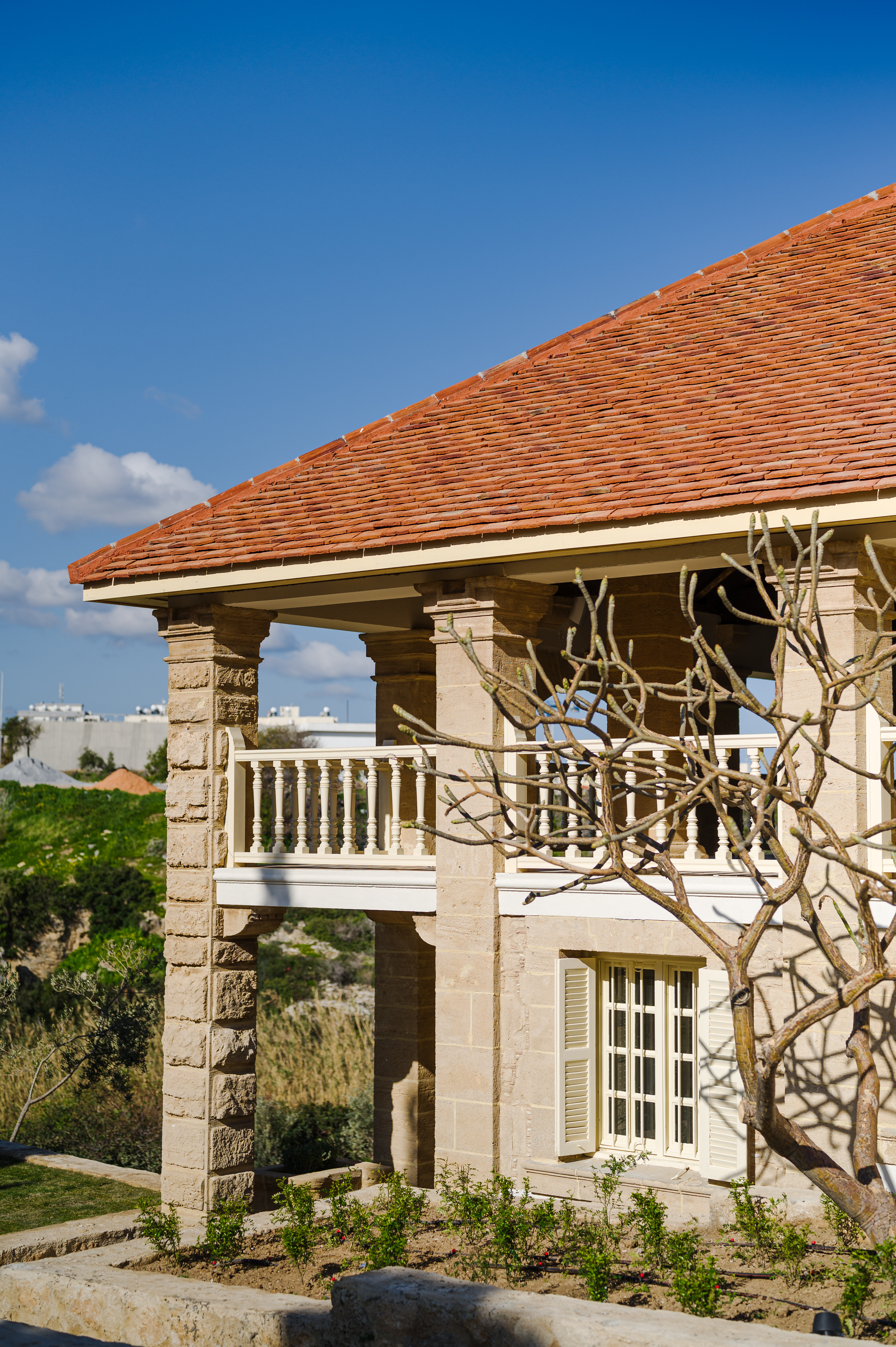
General view of the restored structure.
