= Isabel Don =

Scottish author (1854–1896)

- Born: c. 1854; Forfar
- Died: August 24, 1896; Geneva
- Occupation: Writer
- Father: William Gilbert Don

Isabel Turnbull Sturrock Don (c. 1854 – August 24, 1896) was a Scottish writer.

Isabel Don was born c. 1854 in Forfar, the daughter of linen manufacturer William Gilbert Don. She attended Oxford University and earned first class in literature with honours but did not receive a degree because Oxford did not award degrees to women until 1920. She was an assistant at Somerville Hall and was the second principal of Aberdare Hall.

Don wrote several novels and a history of Holland. Her novel Only Clärchen (1891) is a Cinderella story featuring an English woman, Clare Melville, in Hungary.

Isabel Don died on 24 August 1896 in Geneva.

== Bibliography ==
- The Story of Holland. London: 1886.
- Only Clärchen. 2 vol. London: Eden, 1891.
- Zohrah: A Story of the Sahara and Other Tales. 1 vol. London: Eden, 1892.
- A Strong Necessity: A Novel. 1 vol. London: Jarrold and Son, 1897.
