= Ethel Hurlbatt =

British academic

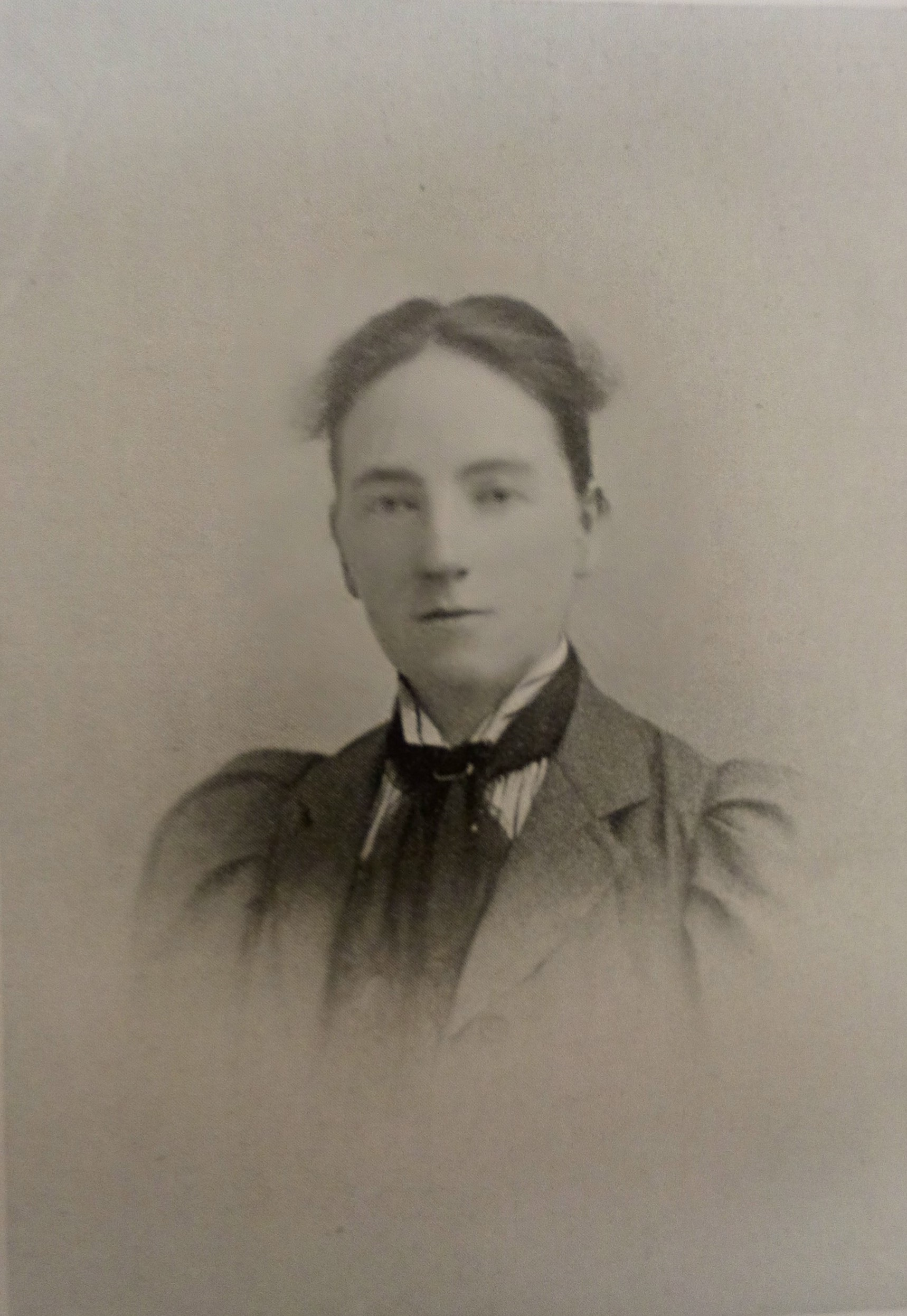
- Born: 1 July 1866; Bickley, Kent, United Kingdom of Great Britain and Ireland
- Died: 22 March 1934 (aged 67); Tours, France
- Education: Somerville College, Oxford; Trinity College, Dublin
- Occupation: educator
- Employer(s): Aberdare Hall, Bedford College, Royal Victoria College
- Organization(s): Cardiff and District National Suffrage Society (CDWSS), Cardiff Charity Organisation Society, Welsh Union of the Women’s Liberal Association (WUWLA), University Women’s Club of London, Comité France-Amérique de Montréal, Alliance Française, Montreal Women’s Canadian Club, Art Association of Montreal, Women’s War Registry Committee
- Awards: Officier de l’Instruction Publique (1918)

Ethel Hurlbatt (1 July 1866 – 22 March 1934) was an English educator and a promoter of women’s entrance into the professions. She is recognised for her work in women's education combined with loyalty to the institutions she worked for. She was Principal of Bedford College, University of London, and later Warden of Royal Victoria College, the women's college of McGill University, in Montreal, Quebec, Canada, which had opened in 1899.

== Early life ==
Hurlbatt was born in Bickley, Kent, England, on 1 July 1866. Her parents were Charles Hurlbatt, a mining engineer, and Sophia Margaret Hurlbatt (née Smith). She was one of seven children.

== Education ==
Hurlbatt was educated privately and then read modern history at Somerville College, Oxford, from 1888 to 1892 gaining second class. Her BA and MA were conferred by Trinity College, Dublin in 1905, as Oxford allowed women to sit the examinations but did not confer degrees on women at that time. She did however receive an honorary MA from the University of Oxford in 1925.

== Career ==
After a year living in Oxford and researching in the Bodleian Library, in 1892 Hurlbatt became the founding principal of Aberdare Hall, the women’s residence of the University College of South Wales and Monmouthshire in Cardiff and now part of Cardiff University.

While living in Wales, Hurtlbatt supported the women's suffrage movement and joined the Cardiff and District National Suffrage Society (CDWSS). She was also honorary secretary for the Association for Promoting the Education of Women, was a member of the Cardiff Charity Organisation Society and her name her name features in documents of the Welsh Union of the Women’s Liberal Association (WUWLA).

Hurlbatt's sister Kate, also educated at Somerville College, succeeded her as warden in Cardiff. In 1898, Hurlbatt became principal of the London women's college, Bedford College, but resigned in 1906 due to ill health.

From 1907 until her retirement in 1929, Hurlbatt was Warden of Royal Victoria College in Montreal, Canada, where she was also "resident tutor" of history. Her service to the college was recognized in 1930 when she received an honorary LLD from McGill.

In Montreal, Hurlbatt was involved with many clubs and philanthropic ventures, including the women’s commission of the Comité France-Amérique de Montréal [fr], the local branch the Alliance Française, the Montreal Women’s Canadian Club and the Art Association of Montreal. She was awarded the Officier de l’Instruction Publique in 1918. Hurlbatt maintained her membership in the University Women’s Club of London during her time living in Canada. She also linked Canadian college women to British women's movements.

During World War I, Hurlbatt served as chairwoman of the Women’s War Registry Committee in Montreal.

== Later life and death ==
During her retirement Hurlbatt travelled widely pursuing her interest in sketching. In the year before she died she had several heart attacks, complicated by influenza. Hurlbatt died on 22 March 1934 in Tours, France.

== Publications ==
- Women and McGill (1920)

Academic offices
Preceded by Dame Emily Penrose	Principal; Bedford College; University of London; 1898-1906	Succeeded by Dame Margaret Jansen Tuke
