= Peter Greenham =

British artist (1909–1992)

Peter Greenham CBE RA
- Born: 9 September 1909; Streatham, London, England
- Died: 11 July 1992 (aged 82); Oxford, England, United Kingdom
- Education: Dulwich College; Oxford University, English; Byam Shaw School of Art (1935–39), Francis Ernest Jackson
- Known for: Painting; portraiture; teaching; author
- Spouse: Jane Dowling (m. 1964)
- Relatives: Robert Duckworth Greenham (brother)
- Elected: Royal Academician ARA: 27 April 1951 RA: 21 April 1960 Senior RA: 31 December 1984; Keeper of the Royal Academy Schools: 1964–85
- Website: Peter Greenham – Art UK

Peter Greenham CBE RA (9 September 1909 – 11 July 1992) was a British artist and Royal Academician, serving as Keeper of the Royal Academy Schools from 1964 to 1985. He was the younger brother of Robert Duckworth Greenham.

== Collections ==
- Ashmolean Museum
- Arts Council Collection
- British Museum
- Government Art Collection
- Guildhall Art Gallery
- National Portrait Gallery, London
