= W. D. Caröe =

British architect (1857–1938)

William Douglas Caröe
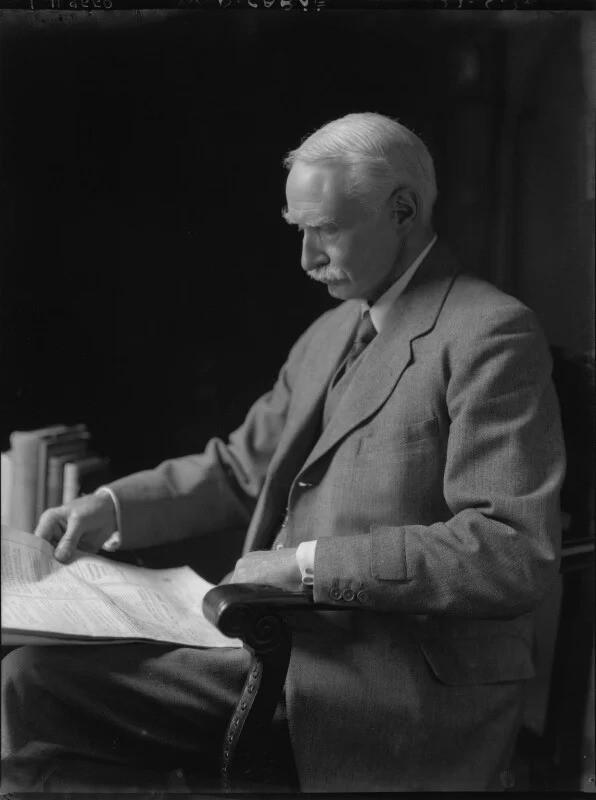
- Born: 1 September 1857; Holmsdale, Blundellsands, Lancashire, England
- Died: 25 February 1938 (aged 80); Kyrenia, Cyprus
- Occupation: Architect

William Douglas Caröe (Note: The surname Caröe is Danish) (1 September 1857 – 25 February 1938) was a British architect, particularly of churches.

== Early life ==
Caröe was born on 1 September 1857 in Holmsdale, Blundellsands, near Liverpool, the youngest son of the Danish Consul in Liverpool, Anders Kruuse Caröe (d. 1897) and Jane Kirkpatrick Green (d. 1877). He was educated at Ruabon Grammar School in Denbighshire, Wales, before entering Trinity College, Cambridge in 1875. He was a senior optime in the mathematical tripos of 1879 and graduated with a BA in the same year. He was articled to John Loughborough Pearson and would later write the article on Pearson in the Encyclopædia Britannica (11th ed., 1911).

== Career ==
Caröe was a major figure in the Arts and Crafts Movement and described as a "master of spatial painting". The firm he founded, Caroe & Partners, still specialises in ecclesiastical architecture, especially the restoration of historic churches.

Caröe was architect to numerous ecclesiastical buildings including St Davids and Durham cathedrals, and Tewkesbury and Romsey abbeys. His restoration of the interior of St Lawrence's church at Stratford-sub-Castle in Wiltshire has been described as "careful". Although he primarily made his name in church architecture, he was also the architect for the 1905–1909 Main Building of University College Cardiff (now Cardiff University), which was inspired by his alma mater Trinity College, Cambridge.

Caröe designed additions to his country house, Vann in Hambledon, Surrey; the house was featured in the TV series The Curious House Guest in 2006. No. 1 Millbank, London, was built for the Church Commissioners in 1903.

In later life, Caröe lived in Cyprus in the winter months. He designed his residence in Kyrenia, North Cyprus: called Villa Latomia, it was built in 1933. He also designed the colonial-style Catsellis Dome Hotel on the Kyrenia seafront.

== Personal life ==
He married Grace Desborough (d.1947), with whom he had two sons and a daughter. The couple's elder son was (Sir) Olaf Kirkpatric Kruuse Caröe (1892–1981), who became an Indian administrator; then came a daughter, Christian Desborough Caröe (1894–1973); and finally a second son, Alban Douglas Rendall Caröe (1904–1991), who followed his father's footsteps in architecture.

Caröe died in Cyprus on 25 February 1938.

== See also ==
- Category:Buildings by W. D. Caröe

== Gallery ==
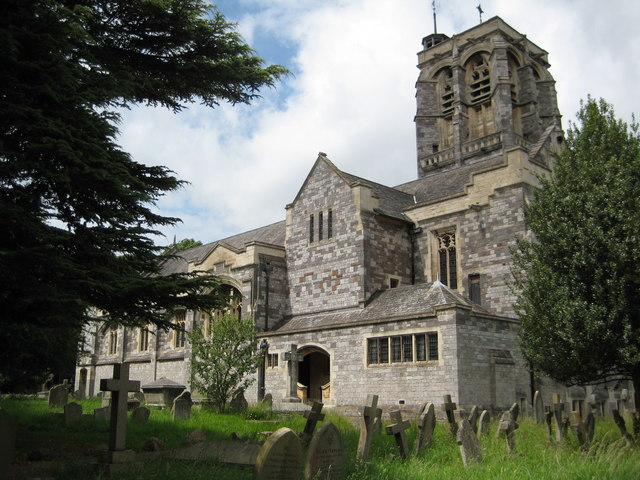
St David's Church, Exeter, 1897–1900

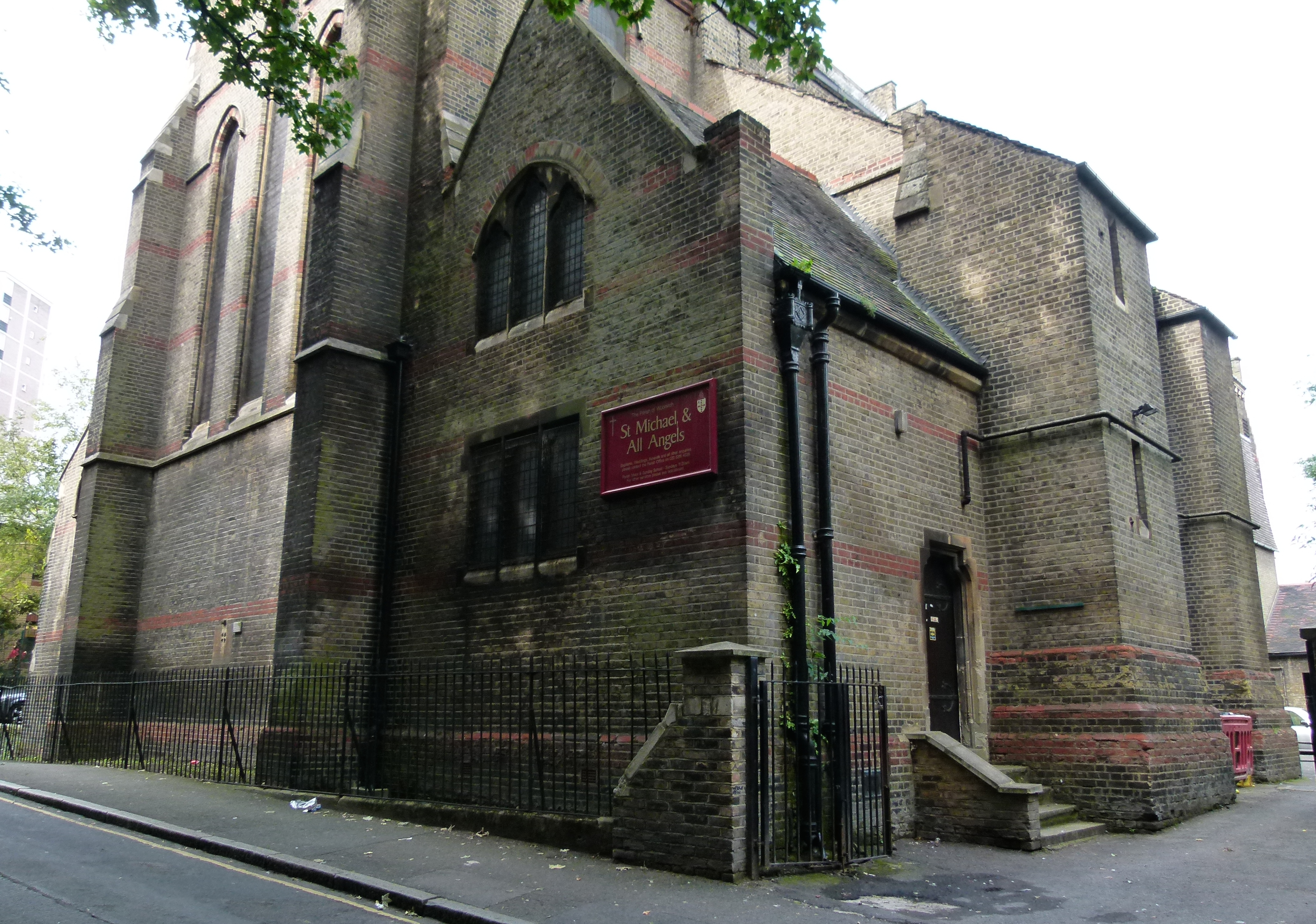
St Michael's Woolwich, west front, by Caroe (to designs by William Butterfield), 1898-1899

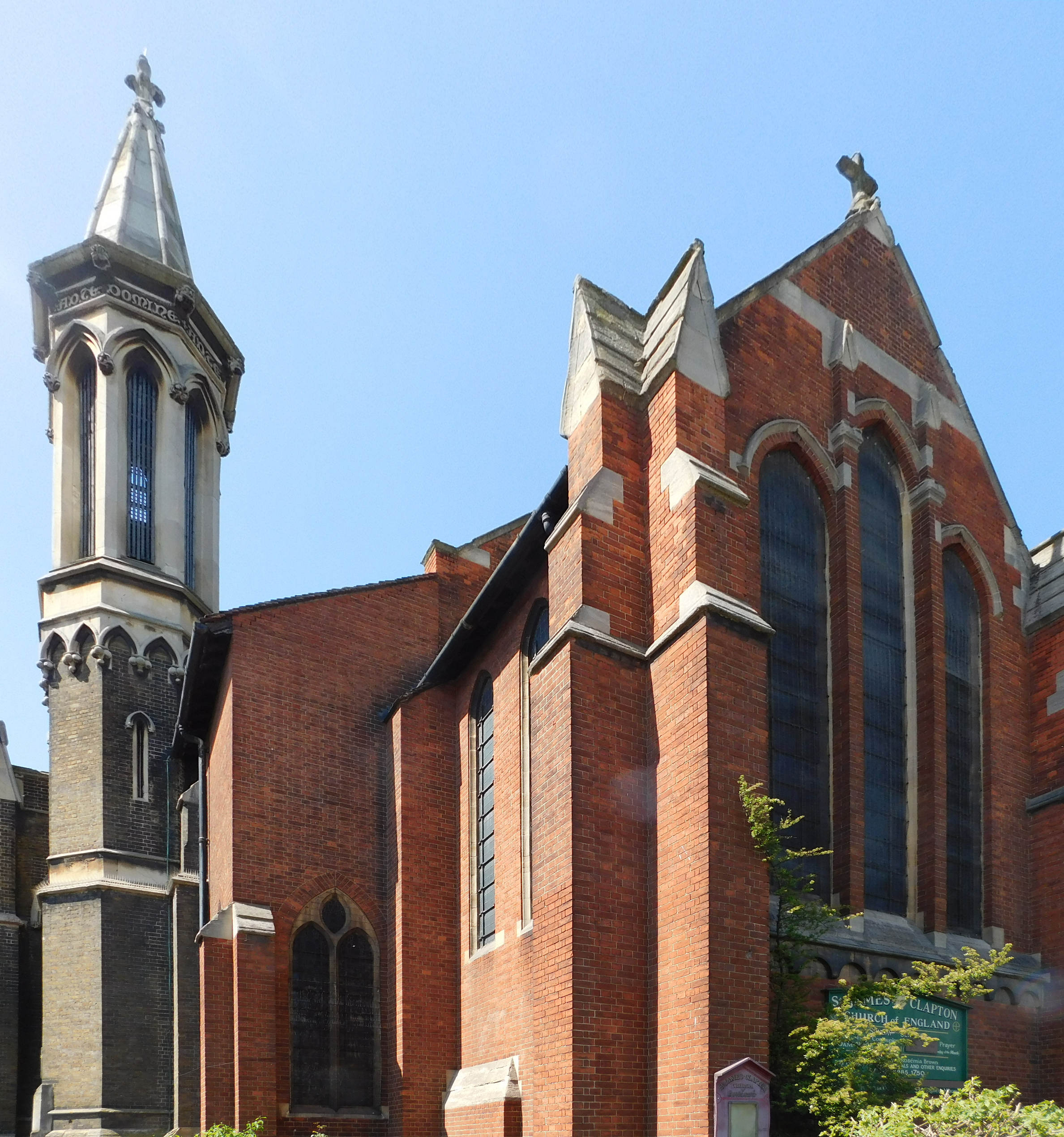
St James the Great church, Clapton: chancel by Caroe, 1902

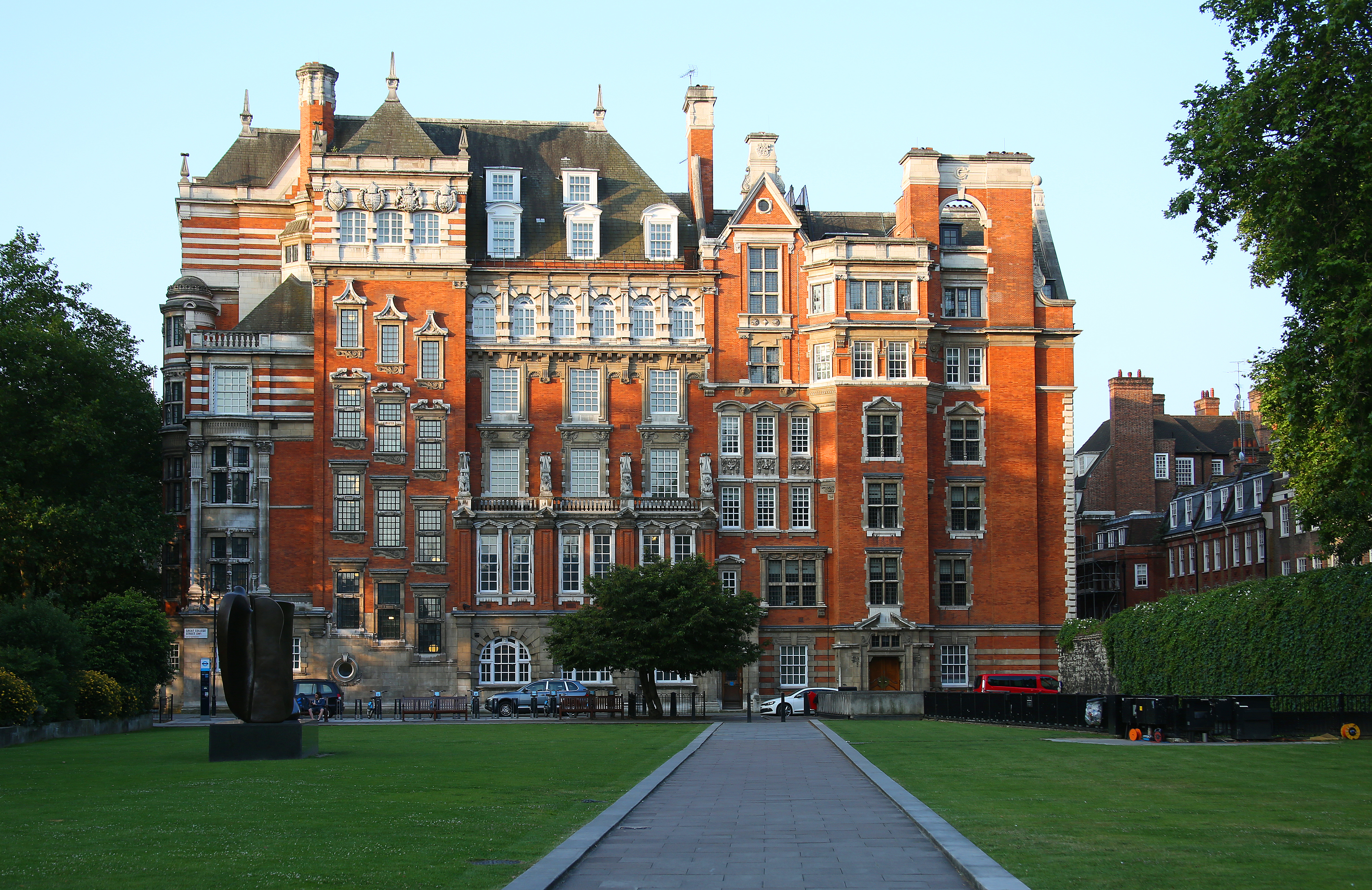
Millbank House, built for the Church Commissioners in 1903

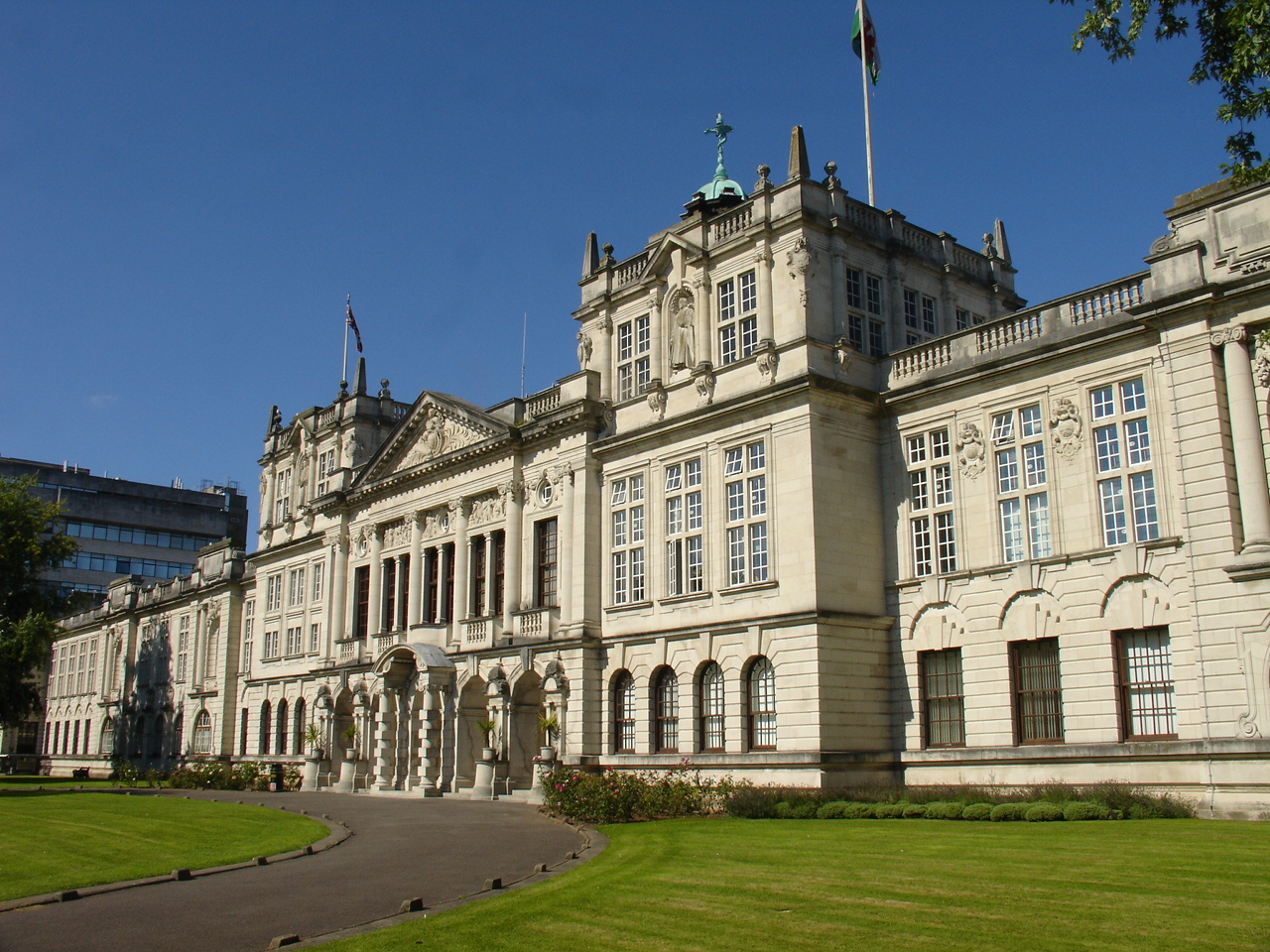
Cardiff University main building, 1905–1909

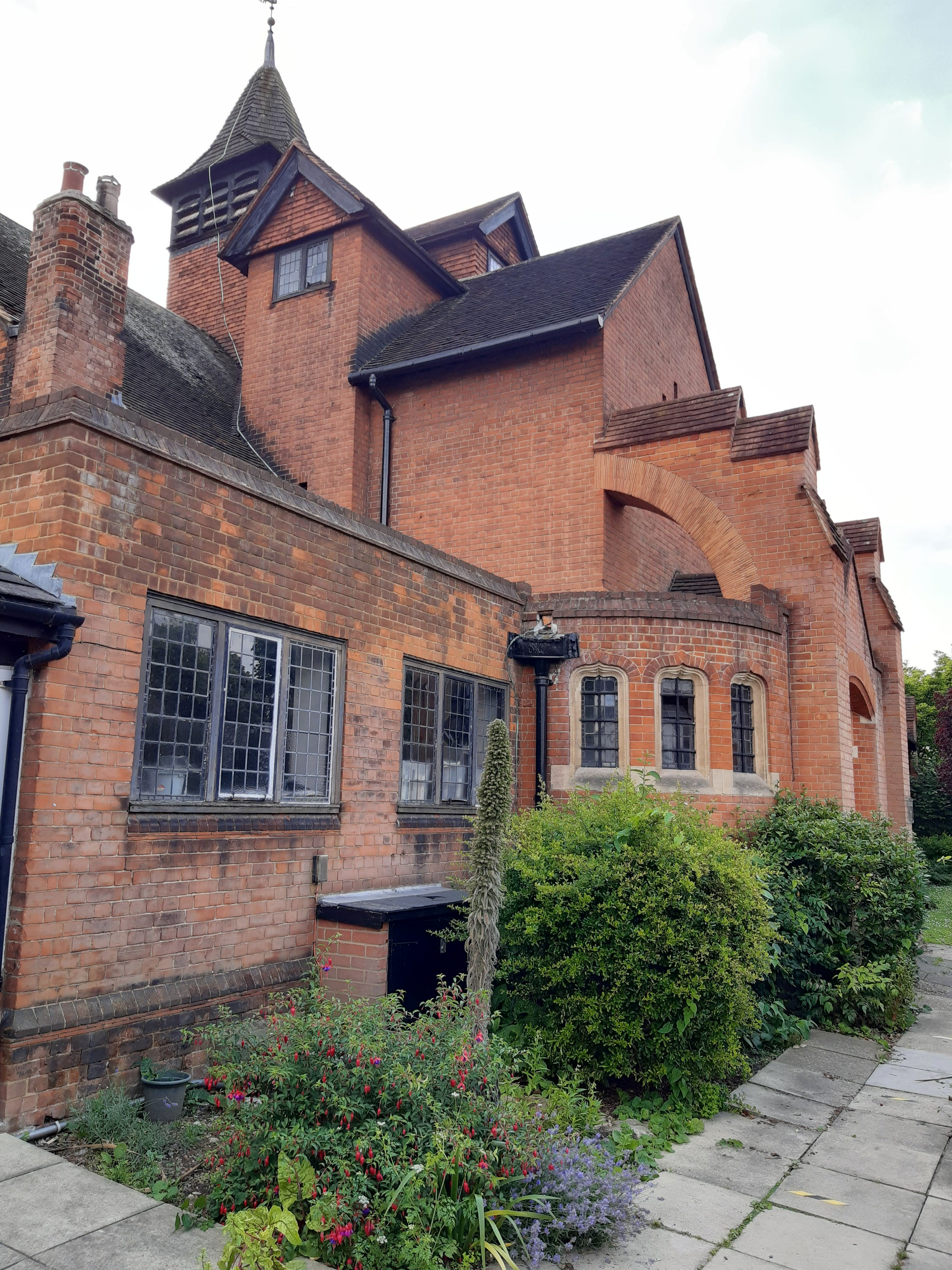
St Michael's Church, Grove Park, Chiswick, 1909

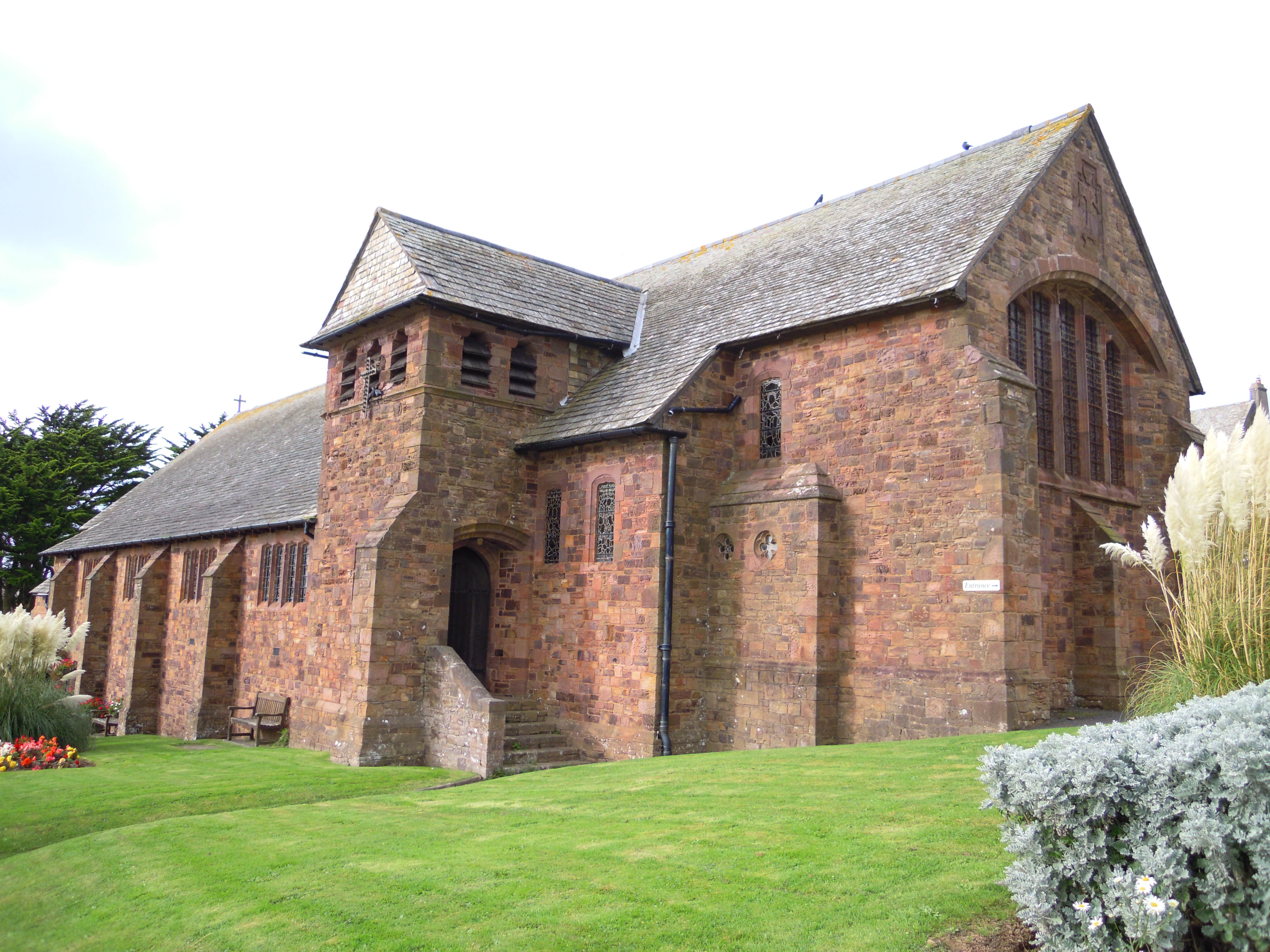
The Church of St Sabinus in Woolacombe, Devon, 1912

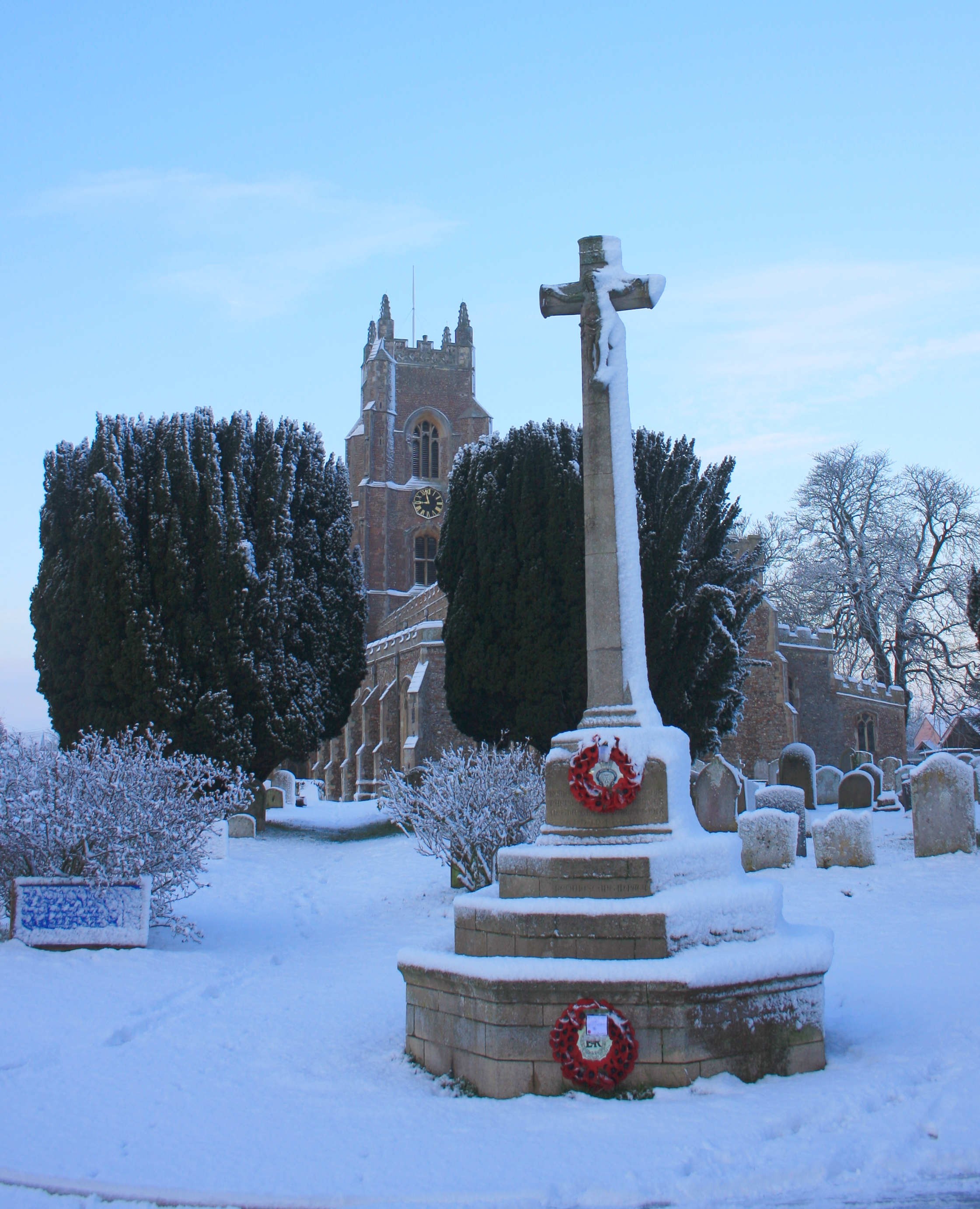
Stoke-by-Nayland War Memorial, Suffolk, 1921

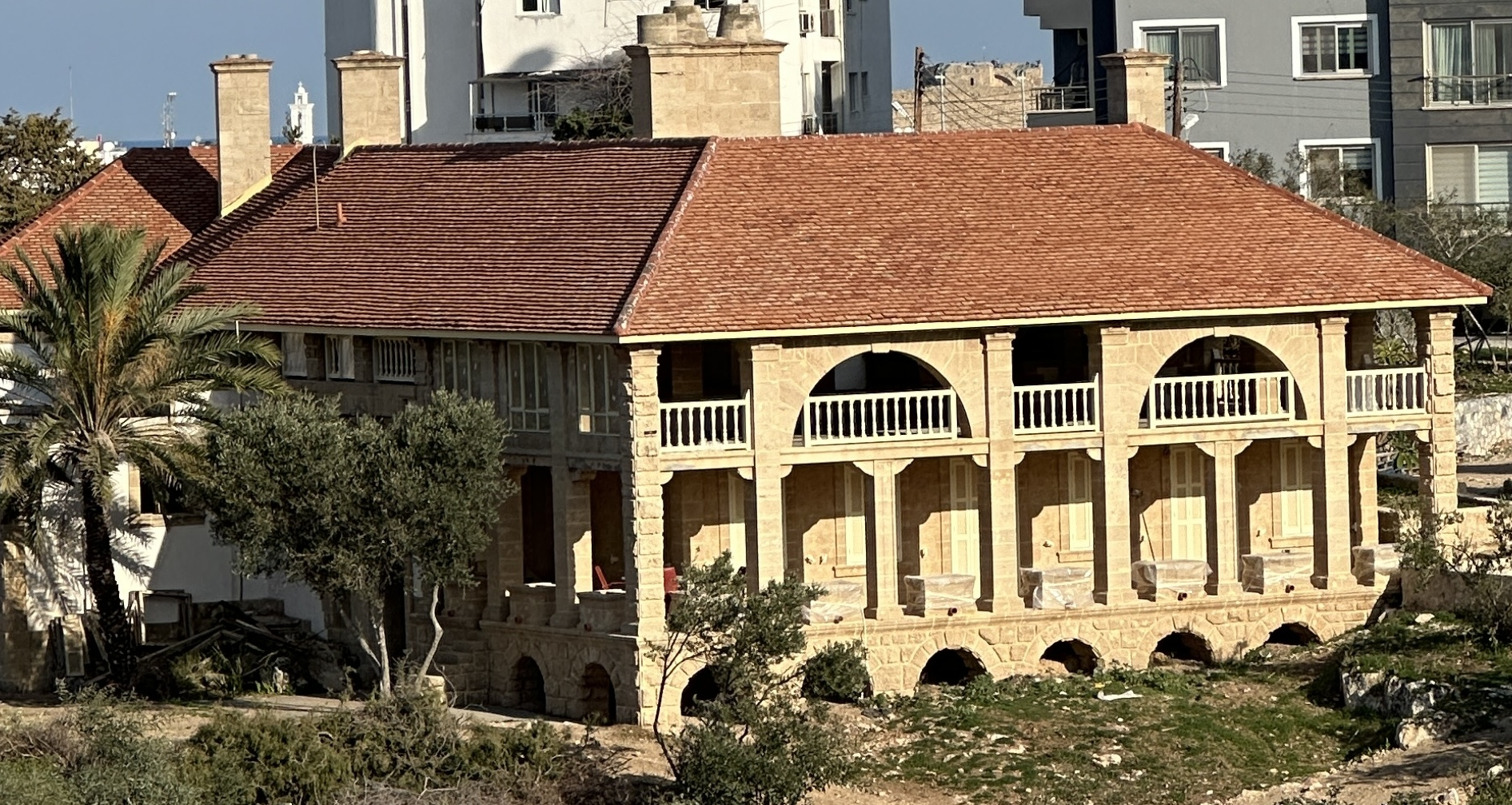
Villa Latomia, Kyrenia, Northern Cyprus, built in 1933 as a winter residence

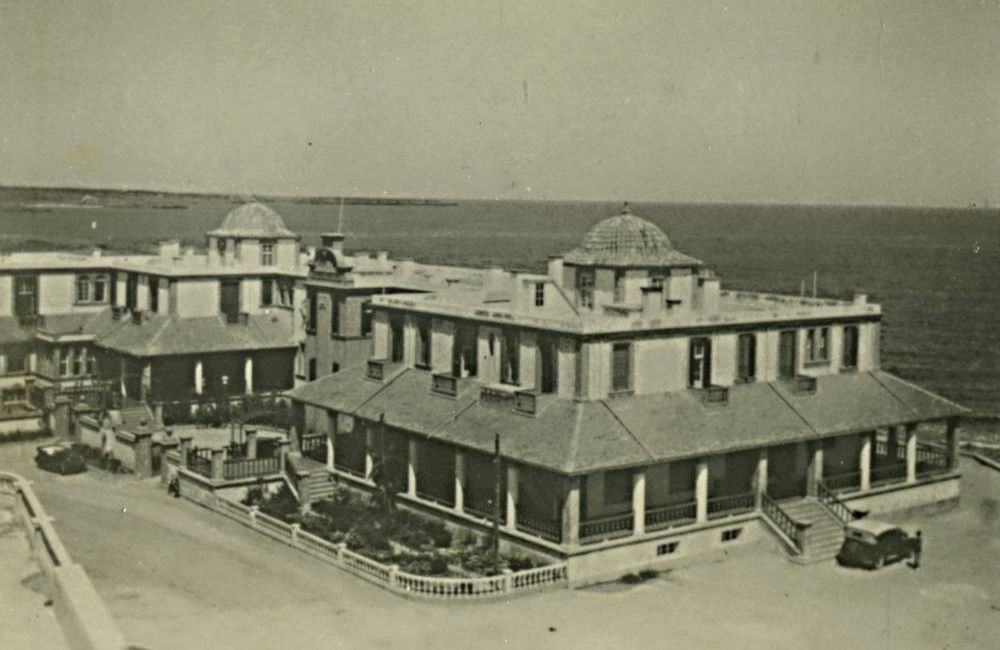
Catsellis Dome Hotel, Kyrenia, before alterations in 1939
