= Robert Duckworth Greenham =

British artist (1906–1976)

Robert Duckworth Greenham (6 September 1906 – 13 March 1976) was a British artist, the elder brother of Peter Greenham. He was a regular exhibitor at the Royal Academy from 1931 to 1969.

He was born in Streatham, educated at Dulwich College and trained at the Byam Shaw School of Art and then at the Royal Academy Schools between 1926 and 1929. While there he was awarded a Landseer Scholarship, the Creswick Prize, the Silver Medal for painting, and the British Institute Scholarship. He was elected a member of the Royal Society of British Artists in 1931, and the Royal Society of Oil Painters in 1933. There was a one-man show in New York in 1937. Greenham produced posters for the London and North Eastern Railway in 1938 and 1939. He is particularly noted for his scenes of the coast and the beach, often in Suffolk, and for depictions of outdoor social occasions. He also produced a series of film star and actor portraits taken from cinema stills during the 1930s and 1940s. There are etchings, prints, wood engravings and murals as well as paintings.

Greenham lived in Abbey Road, London in the 1930s. He was conscripted into the Inns of Court Regiment in 1941 and invalided from the Army in 1943. By the late 1950s he and his second wife Joan were living at Chilterns Manor in Bourne End, Buckinghamshire. He later moved to Gillingham, Dorset. Greenham was married three times: to Kay Gilbert Fahey in 1937 (divorced 1942), to Joan Anne Benbow (married 1943, two daughters, died 1962), and to Janet Phyllis Williams (married 1964). He died in Southampton, Hampshire.

== Examples ==
- '8th Army' (1943)
- 'Anna Sten as Nana' (Royal Academy, 1935)
- 'Ann Todd', (Royal Society of British Artists, 1943)
- 'Bathing Beach' (purchased by the Australian government)
- 'Beach, Late Afternoon' (c1955)
- 'By the Lock' (1947)
- 'Cromer Beach, midsummer' (1928)
- 'Elisabeth Bergner' (Royal Academy, 1936)
- 'The Fun Fair, Paris', (1943)
- 'Greta Garbo as Anna Karenina' (Royal Academy, 1937)
- Hampstead Fair' (1945)
- 'Martita Hunt' (after 1943), National Portrait Gallery
- 'Jessie Matthews' (1934)
- 'Mary' (1932)
- 'Near Cromer'
- 'On the Beach' (1934), the Ingram Collection
- 'Paddington Station in the snow' (1946)
- 'Portrait of a Lady' (1933)
- 'Portrait of Anna Stern' (1937)
- 'Portrait of E. Byford' (1928), Braintree District Museum
- 'Regatta on the Thames' (1957)
- 'St Peter Port' (1974), Guernsey Museums & Galleries
- 'Sherringham Beach' (1955)
- 'Snow in Dulwich'

== Exhibitions ==
- Barbizon House, Cavendish Square
- Carnegie Institute, Pittsburgh, USA
- Chenil Galleries
- Royal Academy
- Royal Society of British Artists
- Royal Society of Portrait Painters
- New English Art Club
- The London Group
- Manchester City Art Gallery
- Redfern Gallery
- Royal Scottish Academy
- Royal Institute of Oil Painters
