= First women admitted to degrees at the University of Oxford =

First women awarded with degrees from Oxford University

First women's colleges at the University of Oxford

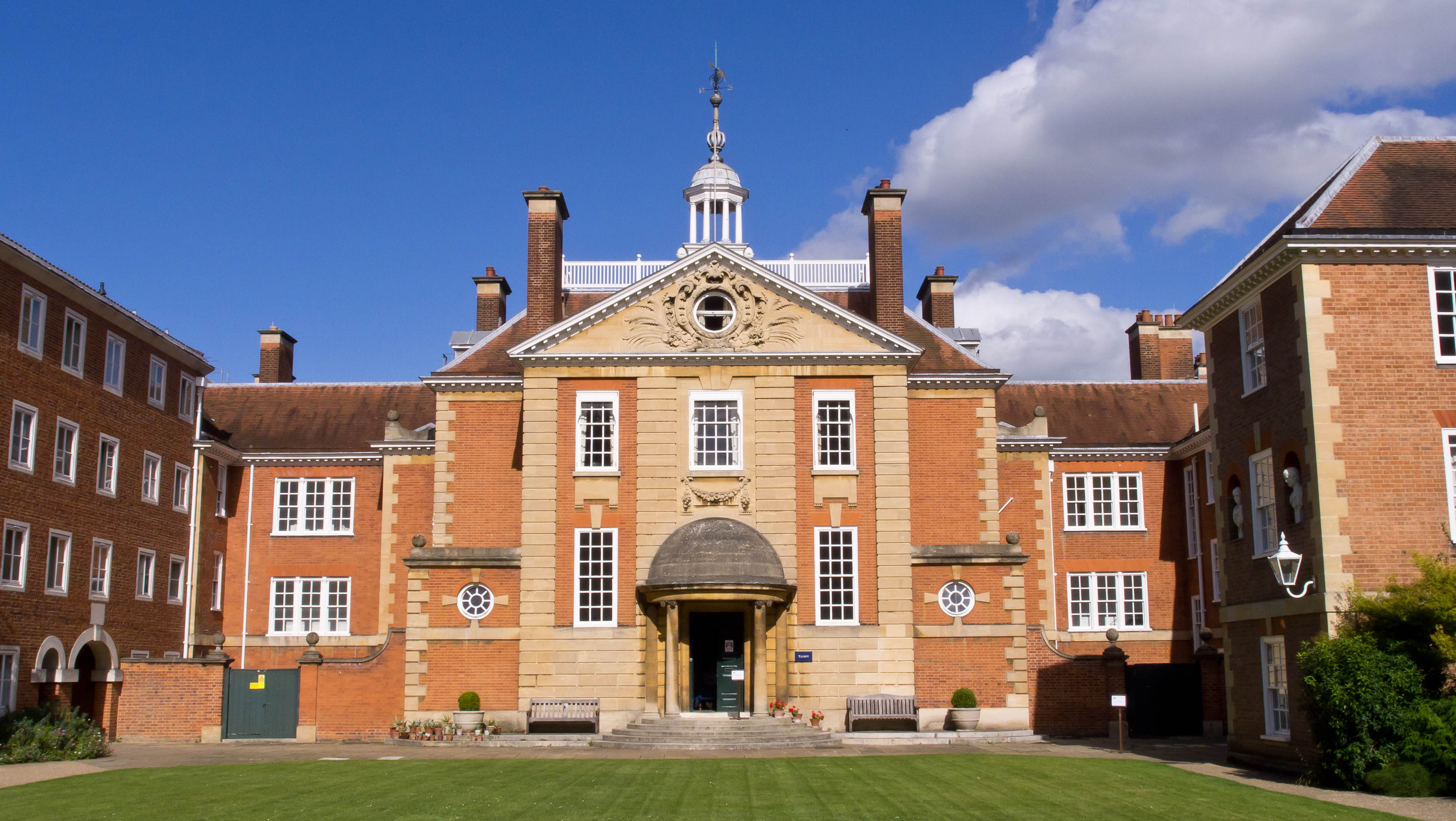
Lady Margaret Hall, founded in 1878

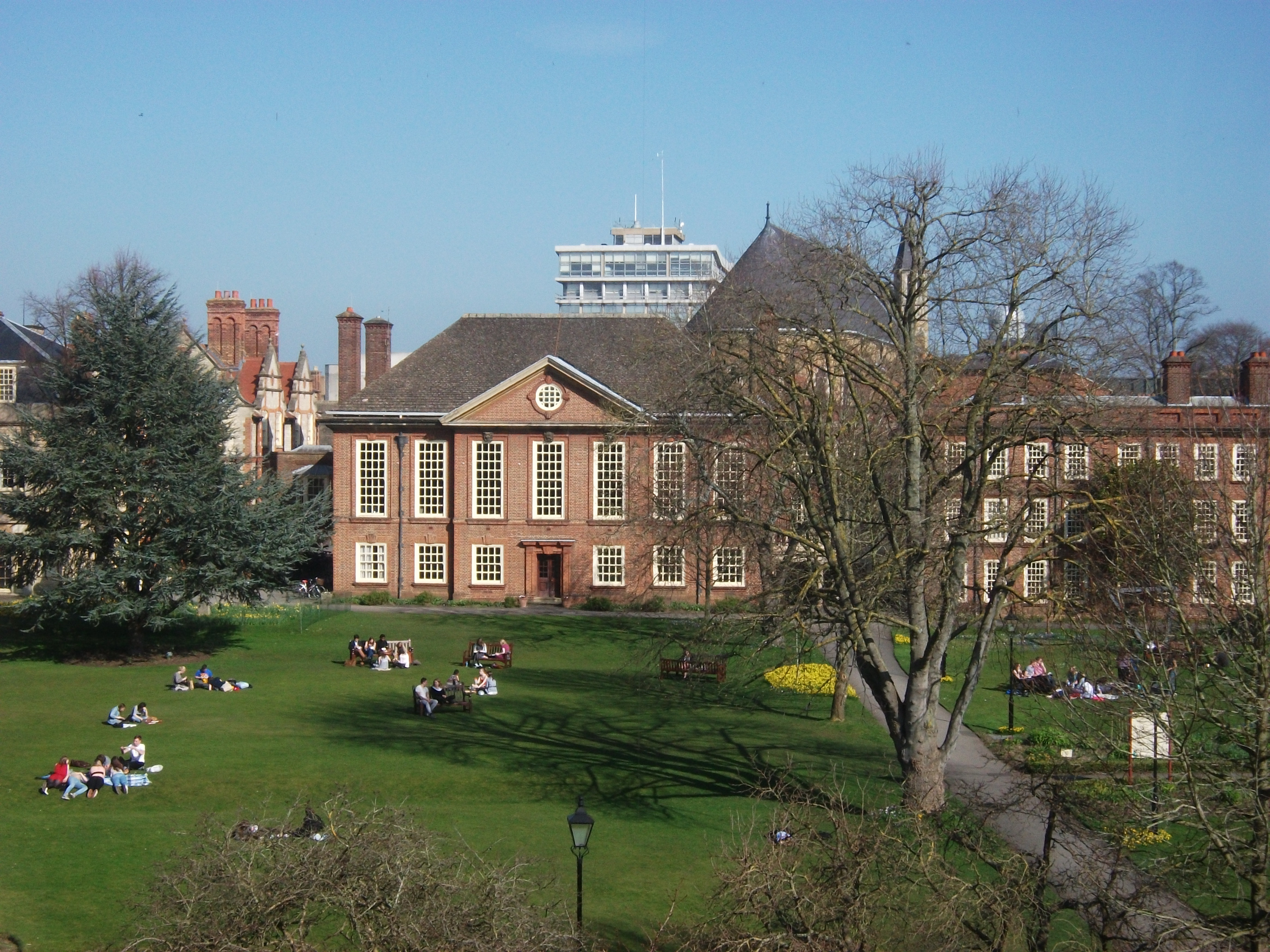
Somerville College, founded in 1879

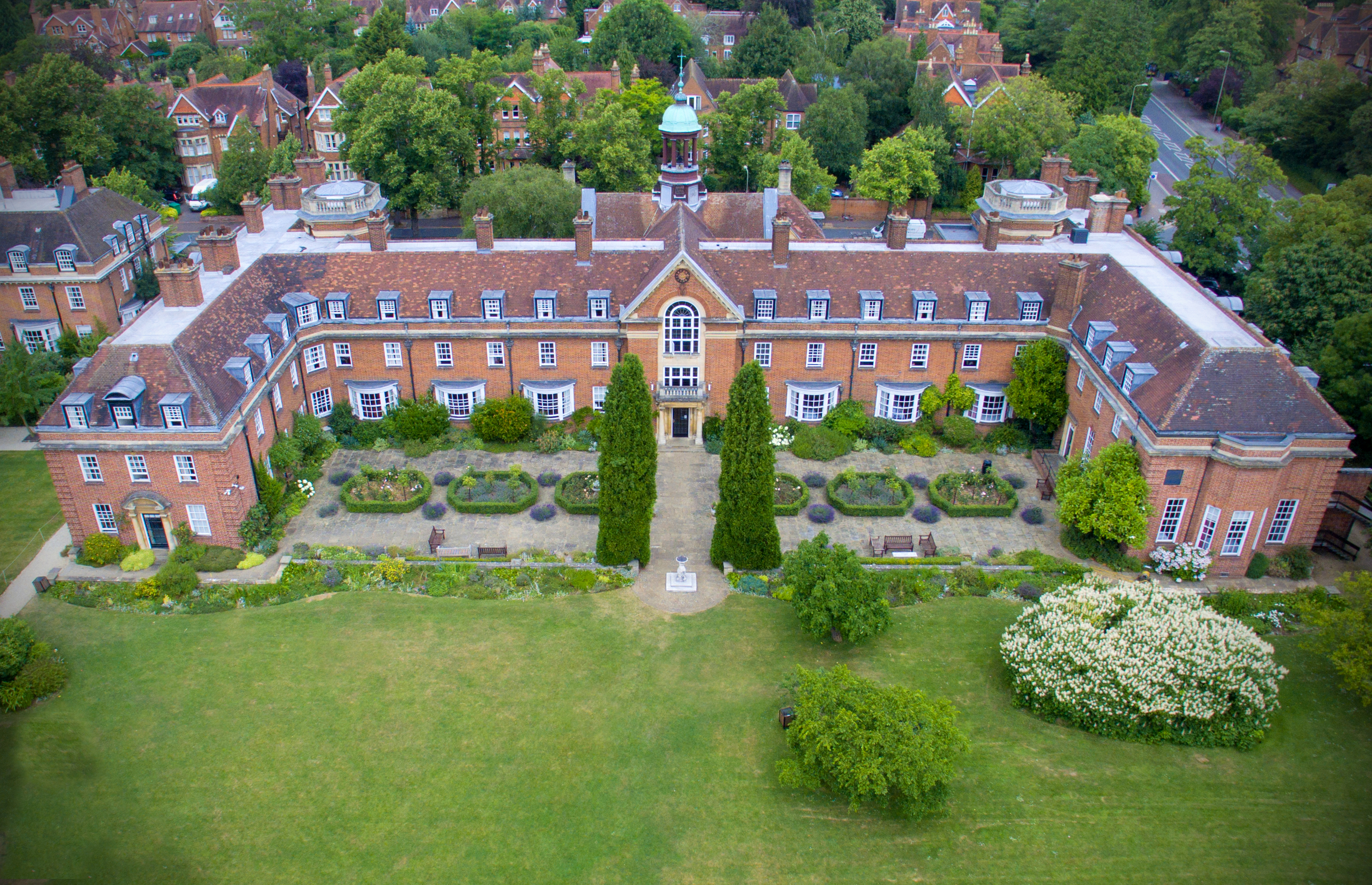
St Hugh's College, founded in 1886

In 1920, the University of Oxford admitted women to degrees for the first time during the Michaelmas term. The conferrals took place at the Sheldonian Theatre on 14 October, 26 October, 29 October, 30 October and 13 November. That same year, on 7 October, women also became eligible for admission as full members of the university.

Before 1920, it is estimated that around 4,000 women studied at Oxford since the opening of the university's first women's colleges in 1879. One graduate was Annie Rogers, who took undergraduate exams in 1875 and 1877 and was finally given a degree in 1920, when she was 64 years old. The last survivor of the first conferral ceremony was Constance Savery, who died at the age of 101 in 1999.

== History ==
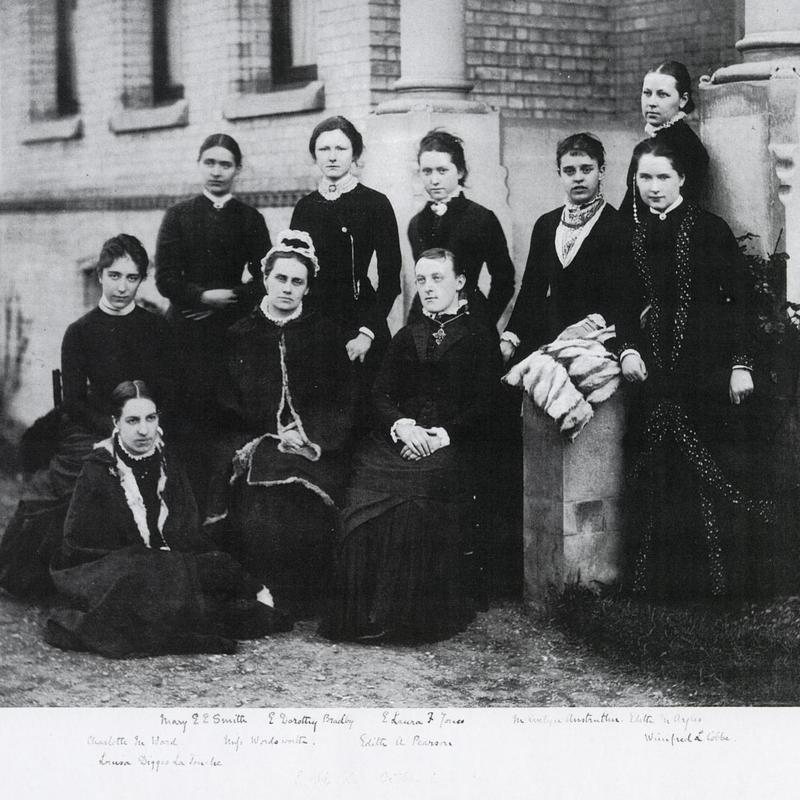
First women students at Lady Margaret Hall, Oxford, c. 1879

For the first six centuries of its existence, the University of Oxford was only open to male students. In 1873, Annie Rogers sat for the Oxford school examination and came out on top, automatically qualifying for an exhibition at Balliol or Worcester College. However, when the university realised she was female, they rescinded her offer and her place was given to the boy who had come sixth in the tests. Balliol College gave her volumes of Homer as a consolation prize. In response to the controversy caused by Rogers' story, the university passed a statute in 1875 allowing its Delegacy for Local Examinations to set examinations for women at roughly undergraduate level; Rogers was able to sit these examinations, giving her the equivalent of first-class marks in Classics in 1877 and Ancient History in 1879.

In 1873 a committee was formed to organise "Lectures for Ladies" by university dons in Oxford. It was also possible to take tests and use the university's Bodleian Library. In June 1878, an Association for the Education of Women (AEW) was formed in Oxford, including members of the "Lectures for Ladies", to organise courses of lectures leading to examinations. Because of religious differences, two halls of residence were opened in 1879 by separate committees: the Anglican Lady Margaret Hall and the nondenominational Somerville Hall From 1879, there were also a number of students not living in halls, who were given the name of the Society of Oxford Home-Students in 1898 (later renamed to St Anne's College in 1952). Two more women's colleges would open before 1900: St Hugh's Hall in 1886 and St Hilda's Hall in 1893. Over time, the halls and the home students took on their own tutors and adopted the name college. In 1910 the halls and the home students became "recognised societies" of the university and in 1920 "societies of women students". From 1927 until 1957 there was a quota system which limited the number of students admitted to the women's societies. They were only accepted as full colleges of the university in 1959.

At first, women students took examinations organised by the Delegacy for Local Examinations. Eventually, they were allowed to sit for university examinations for B.A. courses through the delegacy, which awarded a certificate of completion rather than a degree. By 1895, Oxford, the University of Cambridge and Trinity College Dublin were the only universities in the United Kingdom to deny women degrees. The first vote to give Oxford women degrees in 1896 was unsuccessful. In response to the vote failure, the AEW began to issue a diploma listing the exams a student had passed at the end of her studies. For a brief period in the early 1900s, some women received ad eundem degrees from Trinity College, which began admitting women in 1904 and had made this arrangement with the Oxbridge universities. These women became known as "steamboat ladies" and, between 1904 and 1907 (when the arrangement ended), Trinity College granted degrees to 720 women educated at Oxbridge.

"Oxford has recognised that she has daughters, and some day she will give to them, as to her sons, the right to bear her name and wear her gown."

— The Times, November 1910.

In November 1910, the University of Oxford established the Delegacy for Women Students. This was a huge step towards women being granted full membership, not least because the statute which established the Delegacy acknowledged women as Oxford members for the first time as well as the five women's colleges, with the University assuming formal control and supervision over them.

It would be another ten years before women were finally admitted as full members. The first matriculation ceremony was held in the Divinity School on 7 October 1920. The first degree ceremony followed at the Sheldonian Theatre on 14 October 1920. Between 1920 and 1921, a total of 1,159 women matriculated.

== Degree conferrals in 1920 ==
=== Ordinary degrees ===
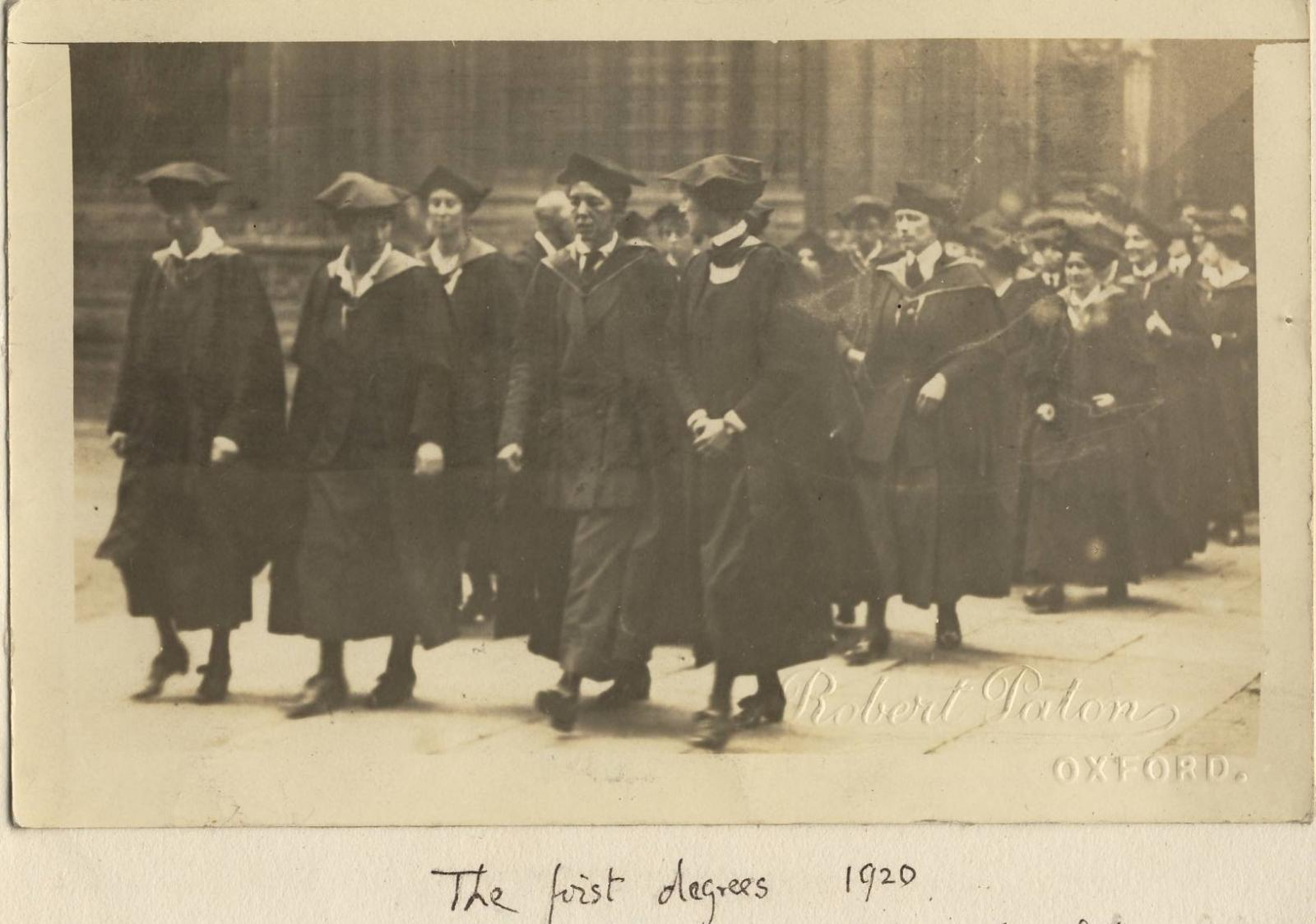
Former women students returned to Oxford to receive their degrees, one week after women became eligible for admission as full members.

The University of Oxford awarded the following ordinary degrees to women between October and December 1920. Master of Arts degrees are not included as it is not a separate qualification at Oxford. Two women each received two degrees and therefore appear twice.

List of women who received ordinary degrees
Name	College	Date	Degree	Article	Ref.
Margery Annie Abrahams	Somerville College	30 October	Bachelor of Arts	Margery Abrahams	
Sybil Ethel Abram	Lady Margaret Hall	17 December	Bachelor of Arts		
Catherine Wise Spence Adams	Somerville College	13 November	Bachelor of Arts		
Gladys Ainslie	St Hilda's Hall	13 November	Bachelor of Arts		
Mrs Barbara Whitchurch Aitken	Lady Margaret Hall	13 November	Bachelor of Arts	Barbara Freire-Marreco	
Mary Blanche Alder	Lady Margaret Hall	30 October	Bachelor of Arts		
Marjorie Mason Anderson	Somerville College	14 October	Bachelor of Arts		
Ethelwyn Austin	Lady Margaret Hall	30 October	Bachelor of Arts		
Mrs Gemma Bailey	Lady Margaret Hall	30 October	Bachelor of Arts		
Frances Margaret Baker	St Hugh's College	30 October	Bachelor of Arts		
Gwendoline Marjorie Baker	St Hugh's College	30 October	Bachelor of Arts		
Joyce Mary Baker	Somerville College	28 October	Bachelor of Arts		
Marjorie Ball	Somerville College	25 November	Bachelor of Arts		
Dorothy Ballantyne	Somerville College	14 October	Bachelor of Arts		
Marjorie Maud Barber	Somerville College	25 November	Bachelor of Arts		
Katharine Eliza Barlow	St Hilda's Hall	30 October	Bachelor of Arts		
Marjorie Calvert Barnard	Lady Margaret Hall	28 October	Bachelor of Arts		
Mabel Lucy Barton	Somerville College	25 November	Bachelor of Arts		
Lucy Draffen Baynes	Lady Margaret Hall	25 November	Bachelor of Arts		
Eleanor Beames	St Hugh's College	30 October	Bachelor of Arts		
Clementina Margaret Enid Benthall	Lady Margaret Hall	17 December	Bachelor of Arts		
Mrs Lilian Bentley	St Hugh's College	17 December	Bachelor of Arts		
Emily Isobel Bishop	St Hilda's Hall	30 October	Bachelor of Arts		
Beatrice Mary Blackwood	Somerville College	30 October	Bachelor of Arts	Beatrice Blackwood	
Eveline Blades	St Hugh's College	13 November	Bachelor of Arts		
Elsie Dorothy Bland	Somerville College	30 October	Bachelor of Arts		
Dorothy Bond	Lady Margaret Hall	25 November	Bachelor of Arts		
Phyllis Kessick Bowes	Lady Margaret Hall	14 October	Bachelor of Arts		
Amy Emily Bowler	St Hilda's Hall	14 October	Bachelor of Arts		
Irene Margaret Brameld	St Hilda's Hall	25 November	Bachelor of Arts		
Marjorie Annie Brett	Somerville College	30 October	Bachelor of Arts		
Sarah Ethel Hilda Brewer	Somerville College	25 November	Bachelor of Arts		
Agnes Elisabeth Brewin	Somerville College	14 October	Bachelor of Arts		
Lucy Marian Bright	St Hilda's Hall	28 October	Bachelor of Arts		
Dorothy Kathleen Broster	St Hilda's Hall	14 October	Bachelor of Arts	D. K. Broster	
Charlotte Gwendoline Bruce	St Hilda's Hall	14 October	Bachelor of Arts		
Irene Dorothy Bryan	Somerville College	30 October	Bachelor of Arts		
Lucy Ridgely Buckler	Lady Margaret Hall	30 October	Bachelor of Arts		
Margaret Elizabeth Bucknall	Somerville College	30 October	Bachelor of Arts		
Hilda Mary Burrows	Lady Margaret Hall	25 November	Bachelor of Arts		
Kathleen Eleanor Buttle Byass	Somerville College	25 November	Bachelor of Arts		
Muriel St. Clare Byrne	Somerville College	14 October	Bachelor of Arts	Muriel St. Clare Byrne	
Alice Mackenzie Cameron	Somerville College	17 December	Bachelor of Arts	Alice Mackenzie Cameron	
Edith Mary Campbell	Somerville College	25 November	Bachelor of Arts		
Florence Myrtle Campbell	Somerville College	17 December	Bachelor of Arts		
Hilda Mary Cann	Somerville College	25 November	Bachelor of Arts		
Margaret Monteith Carlyle	Lady Margaret Hall	25 November	Bachelor of Arts		
Nina Hay Cave	Lady Margaret Hall	25 November	Bachelor of Arts		
Phyllis Crawhall Challoner	Lady Margaret Hall	13 November	Bachelor of Arts		
Kate Elsie Chester	Somerville College	30 October	Bachelor of Arts		
Olive Catherine Clapham	Society of Oxford Home-Students	30 October	Bachelor of Arts	Olive Clapham	
Dorothy Mary Ogilvie Clark	Somerville College	25 November	Bachelor of Arts		
Elsa Bax Carlton Clark	St Hugh's College	30 October	Bachelor of Arts		
Nelly Payne Clark	St Hugh's College	17 December	Bachelor of Arts		
Maude Violet Clarke	Lady Margaret Hall	13 November	Bachelor of Arts	Maude Clarke	
Susannah Lowell Clarke	Society of Oxford Home-Students	17 December	Bachelor of Arts		
Mary Coate	St Hilda's Hall	28 October	Bachelor of Arts	Mary Coate	
Mrs Olive Mary Cockin	Lady Margaret Hall	25 November	Bachelor of Arts		
Mary Frances Codd	St Hilda's Hall	30 October	Bachelor of Arts		
Georgina Rosalie Cole-Baker	Lady Margaret Hall	30 October	Bachelor of Arts		
Dorothy Josephine Collier	Society of Oxford Home-Students	25 November	Bachelor of Arts		
Ethel Margaret Harker Collinson	St Hilda's Hall	30 October	Bachelor of Arts		
Marjorie Comins	St Hilda's Hall	30 October	Bachelor of Arts		
Marjorie Helen Fry Coney	Somerville College	28 October	Bachelor of Arts		
Celia Cook	Somerville College	25 November	Bachelor of Arts		
Margaret Blanche Corke	St Hilda's Hall	13 November	Bachelor of Arts		
Frances Nora Cornish	Society of Oxford Home-Students	30 October	Bachelor of Arts		
Francis Geraldine Hailes Coster	Society of Oxford Home-Students	30 October	Bachelor of Letters		
Margaret Franklin Cotterell	Somerville College	30 October	Bachelor of Arts		
Mrs Maud Mary Danvers Cox	Somerville College	25 November	Bachelor of Arts		
Cicely Musgrave Craven	St Hilda's Hall	13 November	Bachelor of Arts	Cicely Craven	
Olive Mary Crawshay	St Hugh's College	25 November	Bachelor of Arts		
Edith Crichton	St Hugh's College	28 October	Bachelor of Arts		
Gladys Katherine Berkeley Crick	Lady Margaret Hall	30 October	Bachelor of Arts		
Dorothy Whitley Crook	Somerville College	13 November	Bachelor of Arts		
Celia Mabel Crosskey	Lady Margaret Hall	25 November	Bachelor of Arts		
Mrs Dorothy Sybil Croxford	Lady Margaret Hall	30 October	Bachelor of Arts		
Agnes Cuming	Society of Oxford Home-Students	30 October	Bachelor of Science	Agnes Cuming	
Marianne Rose Dacombe	St Hilda's Hall	28 October	Bachelor of Arts		
Kathleen Marie Darnell	St Hilda's Hall	13 November	Bachelor of Arts		
Leila Mary Davies	Somerville College	28 October	Bachelor of Arts		
Hilda Sophia Davies-Colley	Lady Margaret Hall	28 October	Bachelor of Arts		
Elsie Davis	Lady Margaret Hall	30 October	Bachelor of Arts		
Rosamond Annie Carterette De Sausmarez	Lady Margaret Hall	17 December	Bachelor of Arts		
Dorothée Eva de Zouche	Somerville College	30 October	Bachelor of Arts		
Helena Clara Deneke	St Hugh's College	14 October	Bachelor of Arts	Helena Deneke	
Hilda Maud Denney	Somerville College	25 November	Bachelor of Arts		
Mrs Clara Dent	Somerville College	17 December	Bachelor of Arts		
Editha Kathleen Derrick	St Hilda's Hall	14 October	Bachelor of Arts		
Edith Margaret Robertson Ditmas	Lady Margaret Hall	25 November	Bachelor of Arts	Edith Ditmas	
Phyllis Evelyn Dixon	Somerville College	25 November	Bachelor of Arts		
Eileen Theodora Dodd	Somerville College	17 December	Bachelor of Arts		
Auvergne Doherty	Society of Oxford Home-Students	30 October	Bachelor of Arts	Auvergne Doherty	
Isabella Martha Drummond	Society of Oxford Home-Students	30 October	Bachelor of Arts		
Elsie Kathleen East	Somerville College	30 October	Bachelor of Arts		
Gertrude Elizabeth Easton	St Hilda's Hall	28 October	Bachelor of Arts		
Charlotte Laetitia Edwards	St Hugh's College	13 November	Bachelor of Arts		
Kathleen Ada Edwards	Lady Margaret Hall	17 December	Bachelor of Arts		
Una Mary Ellis-Fermor	Somerville College	13 November	Bachelor of Arts	Una Ellis-Fermor	
Henrietta Caroline Escreet	Somerville College	30 October	Bachelor of Arts		
Dorothy Lois Esdaile	Lady Margaret Hall	28 October	Bachelor of Arts		
Gwen Evans	Somerville College	30 October	Bachelor of Arts		
Joan Evans	St Hugh's College	14 October	Bachelor of Letters	Joan Evans (art historian)	
Theodora Marion Elizabeth Evans	St Hugh's College	25 November	Bachelor of Arts		
Elinor Katharine Ewbank	Lady Margaret Hall	30 October	Bachelor of Arts	Elinor Ewbank	
Mrs Agnes Doris Field	Somerville College	17 December	Bachelor of Arts		
Jessie Hatch Flemming	Lady Margaret Hall	30 October	Bachelor of Arts		
Edith Marjorie Fletcher	Somerville College	13 November	Bachelor of Arts		
Florence Rosalie Mary Flew	Somerville College	30 October	Bachelor of Arts		
Winifried Jessie Forrest	St Hugh's College	17 December	Bachelor of Arts		
Annie Mary Cecilia Forster	Somerville College	17 December	Bachelor of Arts		
Ethel Marjorie Foster	Somerville College	30 October	Bachelor of Arts		
Ruth Amy Frampton	St Hilda's Hall	17 December	Bachelor of Arts		
Una Mearns Fraser	Somerville College	25 November	Bachelor of Arts		
Ethel Hartley French	Lady Margaret Hall	25 November	Bachelor of Arts		
Rosalind Mary Fynes-Clinton	Lady Margaret Hall	17 December	Bachelor of Arts		
Kathleen Mary Gardiner	Somerville College	13 November	Bachelor of Arts		
Gwendolen Gardner	St Hugh's College	14 October	Bachelor of Arts		
Viola Garvin	Somerville College	13 November	Bachelor of Arts	Viola Garvin	
Edith Winifred Gerrard	Somerville College	17 December	Bachelor of Arts		
Barbara Currey Gibson	Lady Margaret Hall	14 October	Bachelor of Arts		
Winifred Margaret Gibson	Society of Oxford Home-Students	30 October	Bachelor of Arts		
Agnes Eugenia Giles	St Hugh's College	28 October	Bachelor of Arts		
Madeline Giles	Somerville College	28 October	Bachelor of Arts		
Mary Lindsay Gordon	St Hugh's College	17 December	Bachelor of Arts		
Mary Lindsay Gordon	St Hugh's College	17 December	Bachelor of Letters		
Sybil Maud Goulding	Somerville College	30 October	Bachelor of Arts	Sybil Goulding	
Rose Graham	Somerville College	14 October	Bachelor of Arts	Rose Graham (historian)	
Alice Gray	Somerville College	25 November	Bachelor of Arts		
Doris Eileen Grayfoot	Somerville College	14 October	Bachelor of Arts		
Winifred Mary Greenleaves	Somerville College	30 October	Bachelor of Arts		
Helen Gregory	Somerville College	17 December	Bachelor of Arts		
Winifred Marjorie Gross	Lady Margaret Hall	30 October	Bachelor of Arts		
Ivy Clarissa Gurney	Somerville College	17 December	Bachelor of Arts		
Lois Gunnery	St Hugh's College	30 October	Bachelor of Arts		
Lilian Margaret Gunter	Lady Margaret Hall	30 October	Bachelor of Arts		
Barbara Elizabeth Gwyer	Lady Margaret Hall	25 November	Bachelor of Arts	Barbara Gwyer	
Jeanie Margaret Gwynne	Somerville College	13 November	Bachelor of Arts		
Phyllis Mary Gwynne	St Hugh's College	28 October	Bachelor of Arts		
Mrs Jessie Kilburn Haarhoff	Somerville College	28 October	Bachelor of Arts		
Rhona Brunwin Hales	Lady Margaret Hall	30 October	Bachelor of Arts		
Muriel Mary Josepha Hall	St Hugh's College	30 October	Bachelor of Arts		
Phyllis Stewart Harley	Somerville College	30 October	Bachelor of Arts		
Constance Myra Harris	Society of Oxford Home-Students	14 October	Bachelor of Arts		
Edith May Harrison	Somerville College	13 November	Bachelor of Arts		
Frances Lilian Harrison	Somerville College	13 November	Bachelor of Arts		
Gertrude Clare Harrison	Somerville College	13 November	Bachelor of Arts		
Agnes Margaret Hart	St Hugh's College	14 October	Bachelor of Arts		
Innes Ruth Gray Hart	St Hugh's College	17 December	Bachelor of Arts		
Constance Margaret Hartnell	Somerville College	25 November	Bachelor of Arts		
Ethel Harvey	Lady Margaret Hall	14 October	Bachelor of Arts		
Elsie Briant Hayward	Somerville College	30 October	Bachelor of Arts		
Emily Heath Heawood	Lady Margaret Hall	30 October	Bachelor of Arts		
Nellie Gray Henderson	Somerville College	13 November	Bachelor of Arts		
Dora Margaret Hibgame	Somerville College	13 November	Bachelor of Arts		
Janet Maud Higginbotham	St Hilda's Hall	17 December	Bachelor of Arts		
Dorothea Frances Powles Hiley	Somerville College	28 October	Bachelor of Arts		
Gladys Hill	Somerville College	28 October	Bachelor of Arts		
Ethel Margaret Hirst	St Hugh's College	17 December	Bachelor of Arts		
Marjorie Berta Hobhouse	Somerville College	17 December	Bachelor of Arts		
Margaret Blanche Hobling	Somerville College	30 October	Bachelor of Arts	Margaret Hobling	
Florence Reed Hodges	Somerville College	30 October	Bachelor of Arts		
Edith Hodgkinson	Somerville College	30 October	Bachelor of Arts		
Katharine Mary Hodgkinson	Somerville College	13 November	Bachelor of Arts		
Muriel Sibyl Holland	St Hugh's College	13 November	Bachelor of Arts		
Doris Jeanie Hollowell	Somerville College	30 October	Bachelor of Arts		
Miriam Margery Homersham	St Hugh's College	30 October	Bachelor of Arts	Miriam Homersham	
Vivienne Cecilia Horne	St Hugh's College	30 October	Bachelor of Arts		
Alice Horsman	Somerville College	28 October	Bachelor of Arts		
Violet Edith Houghton	St Hugh's College	30 October	Bachelor of Arts		
Margery Christina Huckett	Lady Margaret Hall	30 October	Bachelor of Arts		
Dora Muriel Hudson	Somerville College	30 October	Bachelor of Arts		
Helen Campbell Hughes	St Hilda's Hall	28 October	Bachelor of Arts		
Margaret Horatia Catherine Hugo	Society of Oxford Home-Students	28 October	Bachelor of Arts		
Dora Ibberson	St Hugh's College	13 November	Bachelor of Arts		
Constance Mary Irons	Lady Margaret Hall	28 October	Bachelor of Arts		
Margaret Gladys Irwin	St Hugh's College	28 October	Bachelor of Arts		
Eileen Dorothy Ivelaw-Chapman	Lady Margaret Hall	17 December	Bachelor of Arts		
Muriel Jaeger	Somerville College	14 October	Bachelor of Arts	Muriel Jaeger	
Mrs Mary Gertrude Jeff	Lady Margaret Hall	28 October	Bachelor of Arts		
Hilda Jennings	St Hilda's Hall	30 October	Bachelor of Arts	Hilda Jennings	
Helena Gwendoline Louisa John	Lady Margaret Hall	17 December	Bachelor of Arts		
Dorothy Catherine Johnson	Lady Margaret Hall	30 October	Bachelor of Arts		
Florence Edith Johnson	Somerville College	14 October	Bachelor of Arts		
Anne Farewell Jones	Somerville College	25 November	Bachelor of Arts		
Katharine Farewell Jones	Somerville College	25 November	Bachelor of Arts		
Leah Kay	Somerville College	14 October	Bachelor of Arts	Leah L'Estrange Malone	
Eliza Mary Keen	Lady Margaret Hall	14 October	Bachelor of Arts		
Margaret Kennedy	Somerville College	30 October	Bachelor of Arts	Margaret Kennedy	
Mary Ethel King	St Hugh's College	30 October	Bachelor of Arts		
Clara Kirchberger	Somerville College	17 December	Bachelor of Arts	Clare Kirchberger	
Frances Irene Knowles	St Hilda's Hall	28 October	Bachelor of Arts		
Mary Winefride Koe	Society of Oxford Home-Students	30 October	Bachelor of Arts		
Emily Lawn	Society of Oxford Home-Students	17 December	Bachelor of Arts		
Alice Mary Layman	Lady Margaret Hall	13 November	Bachelor of Arts		
Beatrice Angela Leary	Lady Margaret Hall	13 November	Bachelor of Arts		
Jessie Lyall Lee Strathy	Lady Margaret Hall	30 October	Bachelor of Arts		
Edith Mabel Lucy Lees	Somerville College	28 October	Bachelor of Arts		
Margaret Mary Leigh	Somerville College	28 October	Bachelor of Arts	Margaret Leigh	
Hélène Lejeune	Lady Margaret Hall	14 October	Bachelor of Arts		
Florence Margaret Jane Levett	Lady Margaret Hall	14 October	Bachelor of Arts		
Alice Kathleen Lewis	Somerville College	25 November	Bachelor of Arts		
Mary Gaynor Lewis	Somerville College	14 October	Bachelor of Arts		
Katharine Mary Leys	Lady Margaret Hall	28 October	Bachelor of Arts		
Hannah Lister	Somerville College	28 October	Bachelor of Arts		
Celia Mary Lloyd	St Hilda's Hall	30 October	Bachelor of Arts		
Eluned Clunes Lloyd	Somerville College	30 October	Bachelor of Arts	Eluned Garmon Jones	
Dorothy Lodge	Lady Margaret Hall	14 October	Bachelor of Arts		
Ida Marion Lord	Somerville College	25 November	Bachelor of Arts		
Mrs Rosalind Stewart Luffman	Somerville College	28 October	Bachelor of Arts		
Frances Grace Lupton	Somerville College	13 November	Bachelor of Arts		
Dorothy Hilda Denham Lyall	Somerville College	13 November	Bachelor of Arts		
Helena Norris Mack	Lady Margaret Hall	13 November	Bachelor of Arts		
Elizabeth Kathleen Mackay	Society of Oxford Home-Students	30 October	Bachelor of Arts		
Florence Annabella Macrae	Lady Margaret Hall	13 November	Bachelor of Arts		
Florence Eleanor Malaher	Lady Margaret Hall	30 October	Bachelor of Arts		
Phyllis Mary Marshall	Lady Margaret Hall	28 October	Bachelor of Arts		
Mary Evelyn Maurice	St Hugh's College	30 October	Bachelor of Arts		
Dorothea Mavor	Lady Margaret Hall	25 November	Bachelor of Arts		
Phyllis May	St Hugh's College	30 October	Bachelor of Arts		
Isobel Margaret Stewart McColl	Lady Margaret Hall	17 December	Bachelor of Arts	Isobel Forrester	
Frances Ann McCurrich	Lady Margaret Hall	28 October	Bachelor of Arts		
Enid Devoge McLeod	St Hugh's College	25 November	Bachelor of Arts	Enid McLeod	
Mrs Marjorie McNair	Somerville College	14 October	Bachelor of Arts		
Nancy Florence Melly	Lady Margaret Hall	17 December	Bachelor of Arts		
Emily Middleton	Somerville College	13 November	Bachelor of Arts		
Anita Newton Miles	Somerville College	13 November	Bachelor of Arts		
Elizabeth Buchanan Mitchell	Lady Margaret Hall	14 October	Bachelor of Arts		
Mary Wood Diack Mitchell	Somerville College	30 October	Bachelor of Arts		
Margaret Frances Moor	Somerville College	30 October	Bachelor of Arts		
Elinor Alice Moore	Lady Margaret Hall	14 October	Bachelor of Arts		
Ethel Margaret Moore	Lady Margaret Hall	30 October	Bachelor of Arts		
Gladys Mary Morgan	St Hilda's Hall	17 December	Bachelor of Arts		
Violet Cecil Murray	St Hugh's College	28 October	Bachelor of Arts		
Phyllis Bruce Muscott	St Hugh's College	17 December	Bachelor of Arts		
Elisabeth Daisy Nalder	St Hilda's Hall	28 October	Bachelor of Arts		
Nellie Neild	Lady Margaret Hall	13 November	Bachelor of Arts		
Eleanor Sarah Nicholas	St Hugh's College	13 November	Bachelor of Arts		
Agnes Isabel Nolting	Lady Margaret Hall	25 November	Bachelor of Arts		
Kathleen Muriel Nuttall	Somerville College	14 October	Bachelor of Arts		
Hilda Diana Oakeley	Somerville College	30 October	Bachelor of Arts	Hilda D. Oakeley	
Nancy Barbara Ockenden	Lady Margaret Hall	30 October	Bachelor of Arts		
Doris Maude Odlum	St Hilda's Hall	14 October	Bachelor of Arts	Doris Odlum	
Ermin Mary Theodora Oliver	St Hugh's College	25 November	Bachelor of Arts		
Constance Mary Ottley	Society of Oxford Home-Students	30 October	Bachelor of Arts	Constance Ottley	
Annie Amy Myfanwy Owen	Somerville College	30 October	Bachelor of Arts		
Eluned Elizabeth Owen	Somerville College	30 October	Bachelor of Arts		
Margaret Christian Pantin	Somerville College	30 October	Bachelor of Arts		
Annie Hunton Park	St Hugh's College	30 October	Bachelor of Arts		
Constance Emily Parker	Somerville College	13 November	Bachelor of Arts		
Beatrice Gertrude Parrett	St Hugh's College	25 November	Bachelor of Arts		
Dorothea Annie Paton	Somerville College	30 October	Bachelor of Arts		
Winifred Mary Watson Paul	St Hugh's College	14 October	Bachelor of Arts		
Emily Frances Mary Peacey	Somerville College	28 October	Bachelor of Arts		
Stéphanie Peacock	Lady Margaret Hall	25 November	Bachelor of Arts		
Sybil Alicia Pearson	Society of Oxford Home-Students	14 October	Bachelor of Arts		
Elizabeth May Peet	Somerville College	30 October	Bachelor of Arts		
Dorothy Annie Allies Penny	St Hugh's College	30 October	Bachelor of Arts		
Isabel Lilian Perkin	St Hilda's Hall	30 October	Bachelor of Arts		
Doris Phillips	Somerville College	13 November	Bachelor of Arts		
Eleanor Addison Phillips	St Hugh's College	28 October	Bachelor of Arts	Eleanor Addison Phillips	
Ruth Leslie Phillips	St Hugh's College	17 December	Bachelor of Arts		
Gwladys Mary Pierce-Jones	Society of Oxford Home-Students	30 October	Bachelor of Arts		
Ierne Arthur Lifford Plunket	Society of Oxford Home-Students	17 December	Bachelor of Arts	Ierne L. Plunket	
Marguerite Muriel Culpeper Pollard	Society of Oxford Home-Students	14 October	Bachelor of Letters		
Dorothy Joy Lane Poole	Society of Oxford Home-Students	14 October	Bachelor of Arts	Rachael Poole	
Mary Winearls Porter	Society of Oxford Home-Students	14 October	Bachelor of Science	Mary Winearls Porter	
Marguerite Potter	Lady Margaret Hall	13 November	Bachelor of Arts		
Muriel Lucy Potter	St Hugh's College	30 October	Bachelor of Arts		
Katharine Grace Potts	Somerville College	30 October	Bachelor of Arts		
Annie Edwards Powell	Lady Margaret Hall	17 December	Bachelor of Arts	E. R. Dodds	
Mrs Evelyn Mary Stewart Prentis	Somerville College	28 October	Bachelor of Arts		
Hilda Frances Margaret Prescott	Lady Margaret Hall	17 December	Bachelor of Arts	H. F. M. Prescott	
Phyllis Mary Price	St Hugh's College	25 November	Bachelor of Arts		
Dorothea Katherine Price Hughes	Somerville College	28 October	Bachelor of Arts	Hugh Price Hughes#Family	
Ethel Favell Priest-Shaw	St Hugh's College	25 November	Bachelor of Arts		
Evelyn Emma Stefanos Procter	Somerville College	17 December	Bachelor of Arts	Evelyn Procter	
Eileen Constance Purdon	Society of Oxford Home-Students	13 November	Bachelor of Arts		
Helen Josephine Pybus	Somerville College	30 October	Bachelor of Arts		
Constance Elizabeth Raymont	Somerville College	30 October	Bachelor of Arts		
Phillis Redfern	Somerville College	30 October	Bachelor of Arts		
Constance Reid	Somerville College	13 November	Bachelor of Arts		
Marjorie Ross Rennie	Lady Margaret Hall	14 October	Bachelor of Arts		
Marcia Alice Rice	St Hugh's College	28 October	Bachelor of Arts	Marcia Rice	
Nancy Doris Richards	Somerville College	30 October	Bachelor of Arts		
Evelyn Violet Elisabeth Rodd	Lady Margaret Hall	25 November	Bachelor of Arts	Evelyn Emmet, Baroness Emmet of Amberley	
Lilian Constance Rogers	St Hugh's College	30 October	Bachelor of Arts		
Benedicta Jeannette Hanbury Rowe	Lady Margaret Hall	30 October	Bachelor of Arts		
Silvia Laughland Roxburgh	St Hilda's Hall	14 October	Bachelor of Arts		
Louise Reiniera Jeanne Antoinette Royaards	Somerville College	28 October	Bachelor of Arts		
Agnes Russell	Somerville College	13 November	Bachelor of Arts		
Margaret Ellen Ryland	Somerville College	30 October	Bachelor of Arts		
Sybil Mary Ryland	Somerville College	25 November	Bachelor of Arts		
Dorothy Maud Sabin	Somerville College	28 October	Bachelor of Arts		
Anna Sandeman	Society of Oxford Home-Students	25 November	Bachelor of Arts		
Edith Julia Sanders	Lady Margaret Hall	30 October	Bachelor of Arts		
Helen Sanders	Lady Margaret Hall	14 October	Bachelor of Arts		
Margaret Thérèse Saunders	Lady Margaret Hall	30 October	Bachelor of Arts		
Constance Winifred Savery	Somerville College	14 October	Bachelor of Arts	Constance Savery	
Dorothy Leigh Sayers	Somerville College	14 October	Bachelor of Arts	Dorothy L. Sayers	
Margaret Rende Bryers Shaw	St Hugh's College	14 October	Bachelor of Arts		
Karen Margaret Shepherd	Lady Margaret Hall	17 December	Bachelor of Arts		
Annie Beatrice Skevington	Somerville College	13 November	Bachelor of Arts		
Rosamund Isabel Skilbeck	Somerville College	30 October	Bachelor of Arts		
Charlotte Elizabeth Louisa Smith	Lady Margaret Hall	28 October	Bachelor of Arts		
Edith Philip Smith	Somerville College	14 October	Bachelor of Arts	Edith Philip Smith	
Mrs Elsie Muriel Smith	Somerville College	17 December	Bachelor of Arts		
Matilda Snow	Somerville College	30 October	Bachelor of Arts		
Constance Lilian Sowby	St Hugh's College	30 October	Bachelor of Arts		
Gladys Rebecca Sowels	St Hilda's Hall	14 October	Bachelor of Arts		
Beatrice Margaret Sparks	St Hugh's College	28 October	Bachelor of Arts		
Dorothy Spencer	Somerville College	25 November	Bachelor of Arts		
Eva Dykes Spicer	Somerville College	25 November	Bachelor of Arts	Eva Dykes Spicer	
Katharine Winifred Spikes	Lady Margaret Hall	30 October	Bachelor of Arts		
Audrey Spink	St Hugh's College	30 October	Bachelor of Arts		
Claribel Spurling	Society of Oxford Home-Students	30 October	Bachelor of Arts	Claribel Spurling	
Grace Mary Spurway	St Hugh's College	30 October	Bachelor of Arts		
Enid Gladys Stacey	Lady Margaret Hall	17 December	Bachelor of Arts		
Alysoun Beatrice Staniforth	St Hilda's Hall	13 November	Bachelor of Arts		
Mrs Hilda Mary Stanton	St Hugh's College	13 November	Bachelor of Arts		
Enid Mary Starkie	Somerville College	30 October	Bachelor of Arts	Enid Starkie	
Elsie Jackson Dawes Staveley	St Hugh's College	30 October	Bachelor of Arts		
Mrs Rachel Elizabeth Stead	Lady Margaret Hall	28 October	Bachelor of Arts		
Mrs Alice Margaret Stevenson	Somerville College	28 October	Bachelor of Arts		
Mrs Phoebe Maurice Stevenson	Somerville College	30 October	Bachelor of Arts		
Eveleen Emily Stopford	St Hugh's College	17 December	Bachelor of Arts		
Muriel Storr	Somerville College	17 December	Bachelor of Arts		
Harriet Jeanie Strange	Somerville College	30 October	Bachelor of Arts		
Mary Sturt	Somerville College	17 December	Bachelor of Arts	Mary Sturt	
Frances Mildred Swann	Lady Margaret Hall	17 December	Bachelor of Arts		
Kathleen Mary Tanqueray	Lady Margaret Hall	13 November	Bachelor of Arts		
Gertrude Winifred Taylor	St Hilda's Hall	28 October	Bachelor of Arts	Gertrude Winifred Taylor	
Margerie Venables Taylor	Somerville College	30 October	Bachelor of Arts	Margerie Venables Taylor	
Emilie Gabrielle Thackeray	Lady Margaret Hall	13 November	Bachelor of Arts		
Edna Marie Thomas	St Hugh's College	30 October	Bachelor of Arts		
Eliza Mary Thomas	St Hugh's College	14 October	Bachelor of Arts		
Mrs Gwyneth Marjorie Thomson	St Hugh's College	14 October	Bachelor of Arts	Gwyneth Bebb	
Sara Armstrong Thomson	Somerville College	30 October	Bachelor of Arts		
Joyce Clement Thornton	Somerville College	30 October	Bachelor of Arts		
Margaret Gertrude Stuart Tidey	Lady Margaret Hall	28 October	Bachelor of Arts		
Una Helen Stuart Tilley	Somerville College	17 December	Bachelor of Arts		
Mrs Ella Ogilvy Tomes	St Hilda's Hall	25 November	Bachelor of Arts		
Dora Sloane Tomkinson	Lady Margaret Hall	30 October	Bachelor of Arts		
Janet Phoebe Tree	Somerville College	30 October	Bachelor of Arts		
Muriel Marion Underhill	Society of Oxford Home-Students	28 October	Bachelor of Letters		
Emily Rosa West Unmack	St Hugh's College	28 October	Bachelor of Arts		
Janet Mary Upcott	Somerville College	25 November	Bachelor of Arts	Janet Upcott	
Anna Mildred Veitch	St Hilda's Hall	30 October	Bachelor of Arts	Mildred Veitch	
Mrs Margaret Walker	Somerville College	13 November	Bachelor of Arts		
Elizabeth Annie Waller	Somerville College	30 October	Bachelor of Arts		
Violet Wallis	Somerville College	30 October	Bachelor of Arts		
Mary Ethelwyn Walton	Somerville College	25 November	Bachelor of Arts		
Evelyn Agnes Waters	Lady Margaret Hall	28 October	Bachelor of Arts		
Helen Waters	Somerville College	30 October	Bachelor of Arts		
Ethel Mary Watkins	Society of Oxford Home-Students	13 November	Bachelor of Arts		
Ethel Carrie Webb	Somerville College	30 October	Bachelor of Arts		
Gladys Evelyn Emerson Webb	Lady Margaret Hall	25 November	Bachelor of Arts		
Frances Mary West	Somerville College	30 October	Bachelor of Arts		
Margaret Sarah White	Lady Margaret Hall	30 October	Bachelor of Arts		
Enid Whitham	Somerville College	30 October	Bachelor of Arts		
Ruth Wild	Lady Margaret Hall	30 October	Bachelor of Arts		
Mrs Agnes Muriel Wilde	Lady Margaret Hall	14 October	Bachelor of Arts	Agnes Muriel Clay	
Rose Mackelcan Wildy	St Hugh's College	13 November	Bachelor of Arts		
Doris Helen Wilkinson	Somerville College	17 December	Bachelor of Arts		
Edith Annie Willey	Somerville College	17 December	Bachelor of Arts		
Cicely Delphine Williams	Somerville College	14 October	Bachelor of Arts	Cicely Williams	
Ethel Carleton Williams	Lady Margaret Hall	13 November	Bachelor of Arts		
Ivy Williams	Society of Oxford Home-Students	14 October	Bachelor of Arts		
Ivy Williams	Society of Oxford Home-Students	14 October	Bachelor of Civil Law	Ivy Williams	
Ellen Dorothea Margaret Winters	Somerville College	25 November	Bachelor of Arts		
Frances Sylvia Wolryche-Whitmore	Somerville College	30 October	Bachelor of Arts		
Winifred Woolley	St Hugh's College	17 December	Bachelor of Arts		
Mrs Lilian May Worthington	Somerville College	14 October	Bachelor of Arts		
Mary Wright	Somerville College	25 November	Bachelor of Arts		
Mary St. John Wright	St Hugh's College	30 October	Bachelor of Arts		
Mrs Rose Frances Wrightson	Lady Margaret Hall	25 November	Bachelor of Arts		
Helen Young	Somerville College	14 October	Bachelor of Arts		

=== Degrees by decree ===
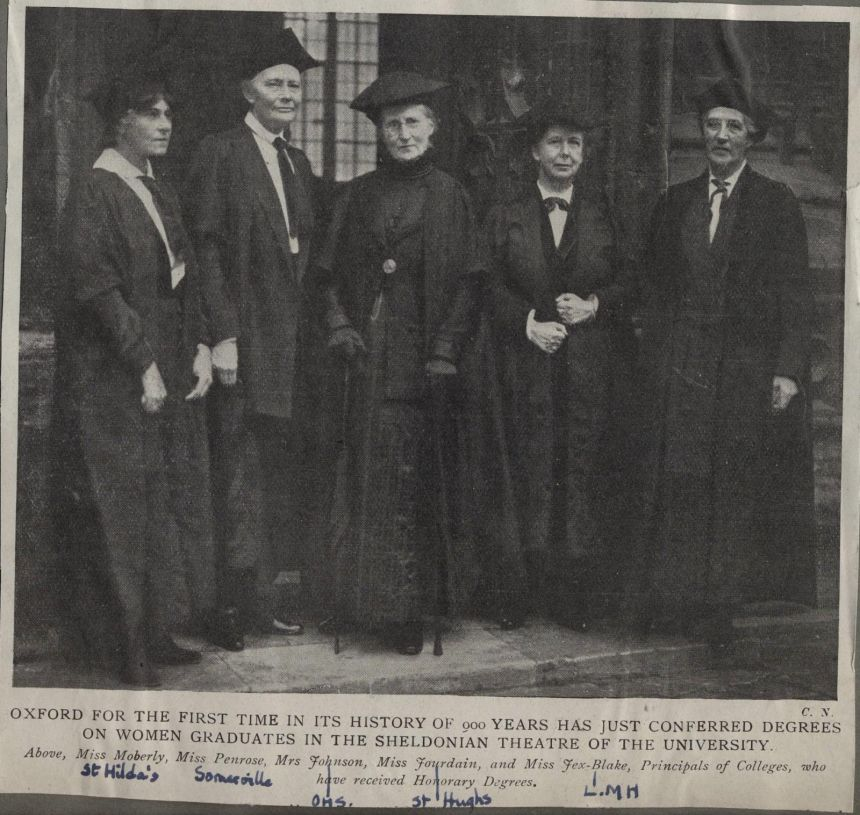
The principals of women's colleges at Oxford awarded degrees by decree, October 1920. L to R: Winifred Moberly, Emily Penrose, Bertha Johnson, Eleanor Jourdain, and Henrietta Jex-Blake

The University of Oxford awarded Master of Arts degrees by decree of convocation to the following principals and tutors of the women's colleges in October 1920:

List of women who received degrees by decree
Name	College	Role	Date	Article	Ref.
Ada E. Levett	St Hilda's Hall	Vice-Principal; Tutor	26 October	A. E. Levett	
Cecilia M. Ady	St Hugh's College	Tutor	26 October	Cecilia Mary Ady	
Alice M. Bruce	Somerville College	Vice-Principal; Tutor	26 October	Alice Bruce	
Christina V. Butler	Society of Oxford Home-Students	Tutor	26 October	C. Violet Butler	
Ruth F. Butler	Society of Oxford Home-Students	Vice-Principal; Tutor	26 October		
Evelyn M. Jamison	Lady Margaret Hall	Assistant Tutor; Librarian	26 October	Evelyn Jamison	
Henrietta Jex-Blake	St Hugh's College	Principal	14 October	Henrietta Jex-Blake	
Mrs Bertha Jane Johnson	Society of Oxford Home-Students	Principal	14 October	Bertha Johnson	
Eleanor Frances Jourdain	St Hugh's College	Principal	14 October	Eleanor Jourdain	
Jane W. Kirkaldy	Somerville and St. Hugh's Colleges	Tutor	26 October	Jane Kirkaldy	
Margaret L. Lee	Society of Oxford Home-Students	Tutor	26 October	Margaret Lucy Lee	
Eleanor C. Lodge	Lady Margaret Hall	Vice-Principal; Tutor	26 October	Eleanor Lodge	
Hilda L. Lorimer	Somerville College	Tutor	26 October	Hilda Lorimer	
Nora E. MacMunn	Society of Oxford Home-Students	Tutor	26 October	Nora MacMunn	
Katharine S. H. McCutcheon	Lady Margaret Hall	Tutor	26 October	Katherine McCutcheon	
Winifred Horsbrugh Moberly	St Hilda's Hall	Principal	14 October	Winifred Moberly	
Emily Penrose	Somerville College	Principal	14 October	Emily Penrose	
Mildred K. Pope	Somerville College	Tutor	26 October	Mildred K. Pope	
Annie M. A. H. Rogers	St Hugh's College	Tutor	26 October	Annie Rogers	
Margaret G. Skipworth	Lady Margaret Hall	Tutor	26 October		
Janet Spens	Lady Margaret Hall	Tutor	26 October	Janet Spens	
Edith E. Wardale	St Hugh's College	Tutor	26 October	Edith Wardale	
