= Mary Coate =

English historian (1886 – 1972)

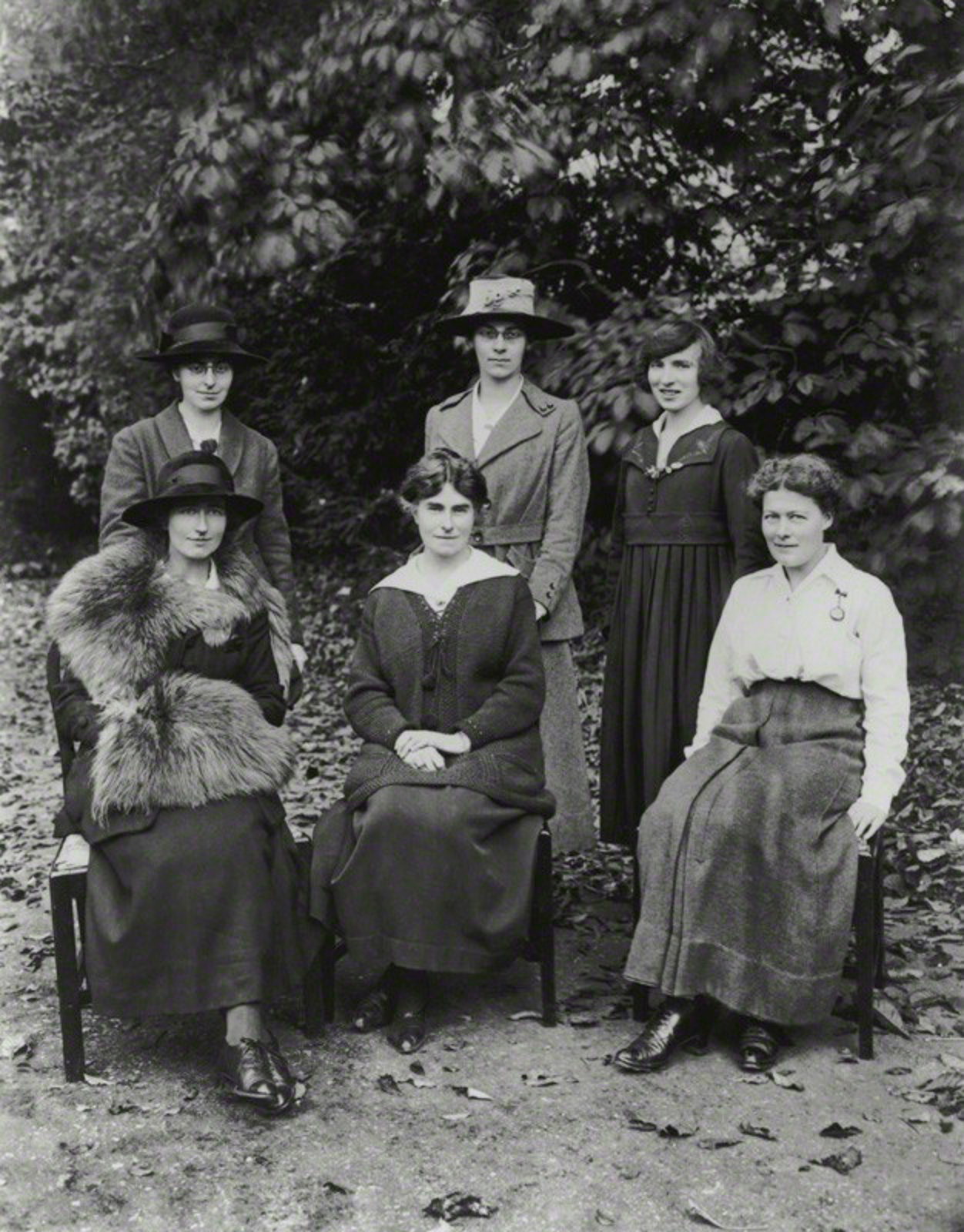
Mary Coate (back left) with staff of St Hilda's College, Oxford in 1909, including principal Winifred Moberly (centre front) and vice-principal A. E. Levett (centre back).

Mary Coate FSA FRHistS (1886 – 1972) was an English historian of the seventeenth century who contributed to widening participation at Oxford, where she taught for almost thirty years.

== Life ==
Mary Coate was the daughter of clergyman Harry Coate, and his wife Henrietta, née Nihill. Her younger sister was missionary headmistress Winifred Coate. She gained an MA from St Hilda's College, Oxford, and was one of the first women admitted to degrees at Oxford when this became possible in 1920.

She taught history at Lady Margaret Hall, Oxford from 1918 to 1947, being elected Fellow there in 1922.

In 1933 she produced her most notable work, Cornwall in the Great Civil War and Interregnum.

She supported the Association of Friends of the French Volunteers (AVF) in World War II, corresponding with members of the French Resistance. Élisabeth de Gaulle, daughter of Charles de Gaulle, was one of her students. Another notable student was historian Margaret Barbara Lambert.

In 1947 she conducted fieldwork in Spain researching the Conde de Gondomar.

In 1958 she was appointed honorary president of the Devonshire Association. She was a Fellow of the Society of Antiquaries and a Fellow of the Royal Historical Society.

== Widening participation at Oxford ==
Mary Coate supported her sister Winifred Coate's Jerusalem Girls' College, recruiting Oxford graduates to teach there and working on a scheme for Jerusalem Girls' College graduates to continue their studies at Lady Margaret Hall.

In 1935, Coate tutored Merze Tate in support of her second attempt to gain admission to the B.Litt program at St Anne’s College, Oxford, who therefore became the first African-American woman to attend the University of Oxford. On Coate's recommendation, Agnes Headlam-Morley was appointed her tutor.
