= Elinor Ewbank =

English chemist and archaeologist (1880 – 1958)

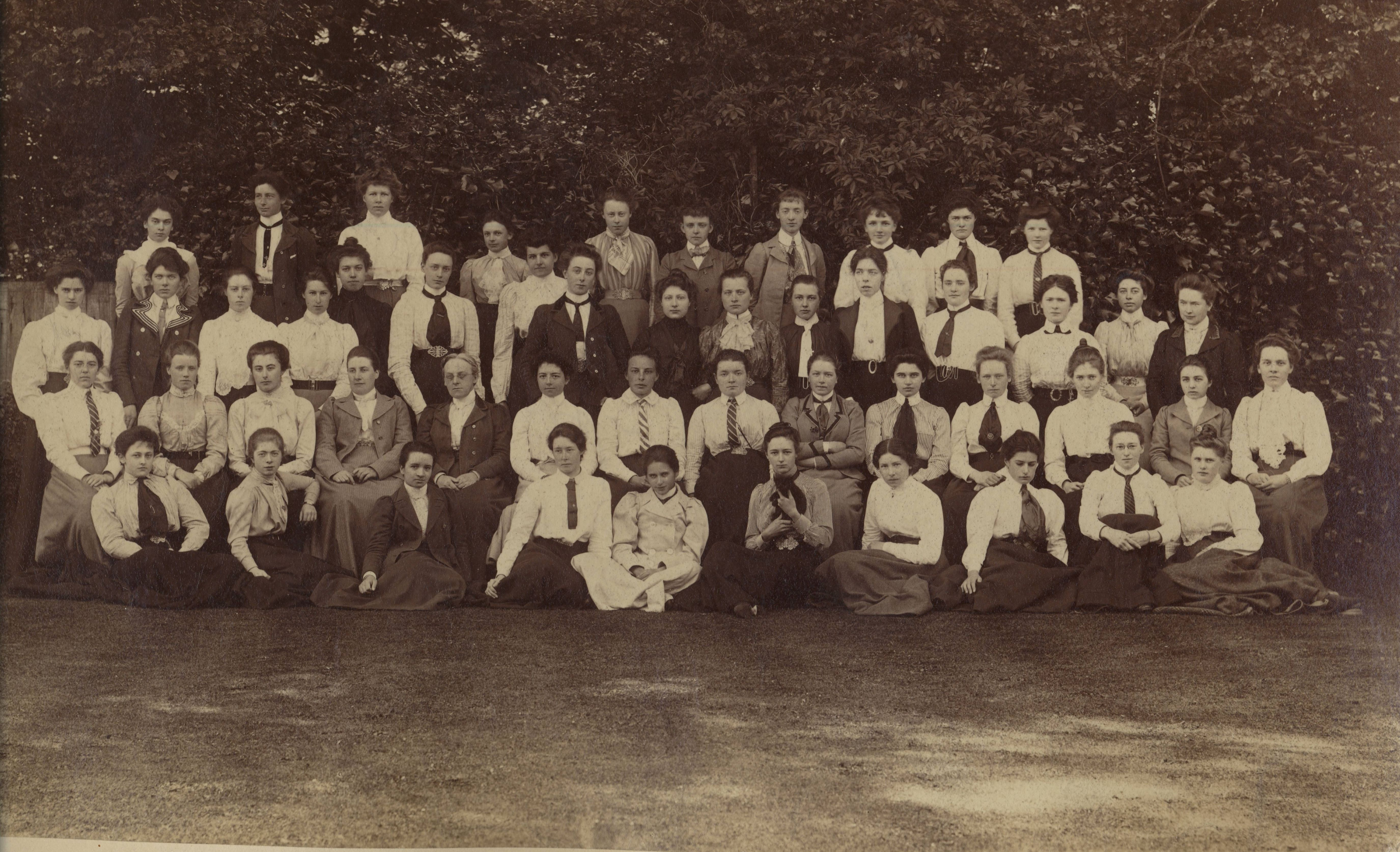
Students of Lady Margaret Hall in 1901. Elinor Ewbank is fourth from left in back row

Elinor Katharine Ewbank (1880 – 1958) was an English chemist and archaeologist.

== Early life and education ==
She was born on 19 October 1880 at Ryde, the eldest of three daughters of vicar Henry Ewbank and his wife Louisa, née Wollaston.

Educated at Highfield School, Hendon, she studied chemistry at Lady Margaret Hall, Oxford from 1899 to 1903. She was one of the first women admitted to degrees at the University of Oxford when Oxford began granting degrees to women in 1920.

== Scientific career and archaeology ==
Ewbank carried out chemical research with Edward C. C. Baly at the Spectroscopy Laboratory of University College, London, co-authoring two papers with him in 1905.

From 1919 – 20, she worked in the organic chemistry research division of the Department of Scientific and Industrial Research. From 1921, she frequently collaborated with Nevil Sidgwick on salts and metal compounds.

In 1929, she worked as a surveyor at Dorothy Garrod's first season of excavation at Mount Carmel. Garrod, her fellow Oxford alumna, had assembled a team of mostly women including Mary Kitson Clark, Harriet M. Allyn and Martha Hackett.

In the 1930s she remained in Israel, researching at the Department of Biochemistry and Colloidal Chemistry at the Hebrew University of Jerusalem.

== Personal life and death ==
During World War I, Ewbank volunteered as a nurse with the British Red Cross, treating Russian and Italian troops.

She was an amateur needlework artist and executed designs by her relative, the artist Duncan Grant.

She died in Oxford on 21 January 1958.
