= Nora MacMunn =

Geography educator (1875 – 1967)

One of MacMunn's publications on regional geography

Nora Eileen MacMunn (1875 – 1967) was a British geography educator. She was the second woman to hold an academic position at the University of Oxford, where she taught for almost thirty years, and was unusual in being a militant women's suffrage campaigner there. As well as teaching her own students, she published educational material for geography curricula.

== Education ==
MacMunn was born in 1875 in Chelsea, the third daughter of army doctor John Alexander MacMunn and his wife Charlotte, née Mathias. In 1896 the family moved to St Leonards, Sussex.

Having been educated privately, she studied with the Society of Home Students, Oxford. She passed a Final Honour School examination in modern history in 1903, and gained a Diploma in Geography in 1904.

== Career ==
In 1906, MacMunn was appointed Demonstrator in Oxford's School of Geography by A.J. Herbertson in response to the increasing demand for certificate and diploma courses. She was the second woman to be appointed to an academic role at Oxford after Alice Cooper, who tutored women studying for the diploma in education. MacMunn's work involved assisting with seminars, practical classes and excursions. She also gave her first lectures in 1909.

MacMunn was a campaigner for women’s suffrage and tax resistance. In 1908 she marched in London with the Oxford University Women’s Suffrage Society. She joined the Women’s Tax Resistance League in 1910 (resisting the idea that single women should pay tax without being able to represent themselves through voting) and the Women’s Social and Political Union in 1911. One of her experiences at a demonstration involved hiding in an empty house from the police.

In 1912 she served on the Committee for the Society for Home Students.

She was appointed Senior Demonstrator in geography in 1918, and in 1920, when Oxford began awarding degrees to women, she and some of her colleague teaching at the women’s colleges were awarded degrees by decree.

In the 1920s, her teaching roles expanded into lecturing, with appointments as Assistant Lecturer in geography in 1922 and Lecturer in regional geography in 1924. She began supervising graduate students in 1933. As well as teaching practical classes, she gave lectures covering historical geography and a wide range of regional geographies from across the world.

== Publications ==
MacMunn published teaching aids including Guide to Geographical books and appliances (1910) with Robert Mill, as well as regional geographies and articles in The Geographical Journal. Having assisted Herbertson with his project to produce a regional geography of Europe, MacMunn and Geraldine Coster used his outline to write Europe: A Regional Geography, which was published in 1922 as a comprehensive teaching text for older students. MacMunn also assisted Lucy Toulmin Smith in producing her Itinerary of John Leland.

== Later life ==
In 1935, MacMunn retired from her Oxford posts. In her later life, she lived with pioneering lawyer Ivy Williams and retired missionary Alice Rylance.

She died at Eastbourne in 1967.
