= Katharine McCutcheon =

Irish educator (1875 – 1956)

- Born: 1875; Donaghadee
- Died: 1956 (aged 80–81)
- Education: Methodist College Belfast; Girton College, Cambridge
- Employer(s): Lady Margaret Hall, Oxford; University College, Reading; St Leonards School

Katharine Sara Howard McCutcheon (1875 – 1956) was an Irish educator. Headmistress of St Leonards School from 1922 to 1938, she taught at Lady Margaret Hall, Oxford and the University of Reading and was on the board of several women's colleges.

== Life ==
McCutcheon was born in 1875 in Donaghadee, County Down, to theology teacher Revd Oliver McCutcheon and Jane Tobias. She was educated at her father's school: Methodist College Belfast.

She studied classics and philosophy at Girton College, Cambridge from 1896, gaining a first class pass. Cambridge did not award degrees to women at the time, but she received a degree from Queen's College, Belfast in 1900.

McCutcheon was a tutor in classics at Lady Margaret Hall from 1910 to 1922, and was appointed by the University of Reading, alongside Annie Hunt, to replace Donald Atkinson when he was conscripted for World War I in 1917. When Oxford began admitting women to degrees in 1920, McCutcheon and some of her fellow tutors and lecturers were given degrees by decree. The University of St Andrews also awarded her an honorary LLD in 1934.

McCutcheon served as classical mistress at St Leonards from 1900 to 1910 and then as headmistress from 1922 to 1938. She co-edited St Leonards School, 1877-1927 with Julia Mary Grant.

She served as a governor of Girton College, on the board of Bedford College, London, and on the board of a London women's teacher training college, Furzedown.
