= Margery Abrahams =

British dietitian and humanitarian worker (1896 – 1983)

Margery Annie Abrahams (1896 – 1983) was a British dietitian who helped organise the Kindertransport scheme to rescue children from the Holocaust.

== Early life and education ==
She was born in 1896, the only child of medical doctor Bertram Abrams and his wife Jane, née Simmons, a concert pianist. Both parents were from long-established Jewish families. She grew up in Amersham, and was raised by her maternal uncle after being orphaned at fourteen.

In about 1918, Margery worked at the Zion Institute as the secretary of Benjamin Cohen, who remained a lifelong friend and a benefactor of her humanitarian efforts.

Margery was one of the first women admitted to degrees at the University of Oxford when she gained an MA in history in 1920 at Somerville College. In 1927, she gained an MSc from Columbia University, New York, with a thesis on infant nutrition.

== Career and humanitarian work ==
As hospitals began to create posts for dietitians, she was taken on at St Bartholomew’s Hospital. She mentored Dr Elsie Widdowson there and they published a book together in 1937, Modern Dietary Treatment, which contained tables for calculating the calorific content of foods and preventative dietary principles. Margery served as the first chairperson of the British Dietetic Association from 1936, becoming one of the first Fellows there in 1979.

Margery helped with the fundraising and organisation of the Kindertransport system. She found local accommodation for refugee children, including fostering a fifteen-year-old escapee from Czechoslovakia in her home and hosting about twenty orphans in another of her properties.

She died in 1983, commemorated by Abrahams Close in Amersham.
