= A. E. Levett =

English historian (1881–1932)

Elizabeth Levett FRHistS
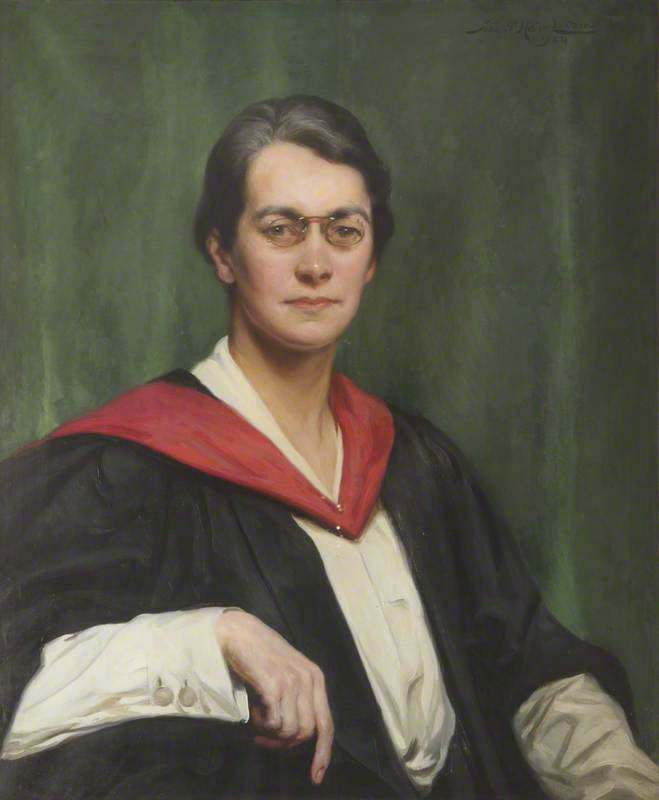
- Born: Ada Elizabeth Levett; 10 August 1881; Bodiam, Sussex
- Died: 9 December 1932 (aged 51)

Academic background
- Education: Lady Margaret Hall, Oxford
- Academic advisor: Eleanor Lodge

Academic work
- Discipline: History
- Sub-discipline: Economic history
- Institutions: St Hilda's College, Oxford; King's College London; Westfield College
- Notable students: Julia de Lacy Mann

Professor (Ada) Elizabeth Levett FRHistS (10 August 1881 – 9 December 1932), known professionally as A. E. Levett, was an Oxford-educated native of Bodiam, Sussex, who became a pioneering woman economic historian specialising in medieval feudalism. Levett was Vice Principal of St Hilda's College, Oxford, and later took up an appointment to a history chair at Westfield College at the University of London.

== Early life and education ==
Levett was born on 10 August 1881, the eldest daughter of Mr and Mrs Henry Levett, in Bodiam, near the border between Kent and Sussex. The Levett family had long settled in the area. Levett's father was a simple yeoman farmer as well as an outdoor enthusiast. Academic pursuits were not encouraged in the household, especially for women. Nevertheless, both Elizabeth and her younger sister Mary Jane Levett (known professionally as M. J. Levett) became noted scholars.

Levett was privately educated at a small school in Tunbridge Wells, Kent, before taking University Extension Courses in Literature and History. She went on to win the James Cropper Scholarship, which enabled her to attend Lady Margaret Hall, Oxford. At Oxford, she studied history under the tutelage of Dr Eleanor Lodge and achieved First class honours. At the time, the University of Oxford did not award degrees to women students; Levett was conferred with an MA by decree of convocation in October 1920, some 13 years after she had completed her undergraduate studies.

== Academic career ==
Having finished her course at Oxford in 1907, Levett was awarded a Gilchrist Studentship, which enabled her to further her studies of history for a year in Paris at the Ecole des Chartes and Ecole des Hautes Études.

In 1908, Levett returned to Lady Margaret Hall, her alma mater, to work at the college's library. From 1909, she spent a year as a history teacher at Edgbaston High School for Girls.

In 1910, Levett became a Tutor in Modern History at St Hilda's College, Oxford, where she would remain until 1923. She was later appointed vice-principal of the college in 1913, serving under both Christine Burrows and Winifred Moberly. During her time at St Hilda's her scrupulous research and lean writing style made her stand out, even among her women contemporaries at Oxford, who often chose the route of close archival study to set themselves apart from male contemporaries. These women were redefining the role of women at the University: women had been forbidden to be faculty members or examine for the university, nor were they allowed to take the M.A. diploma (they were permitted to take a B.A.). Oxford published women's examination results in a separate class-list up until 1952.

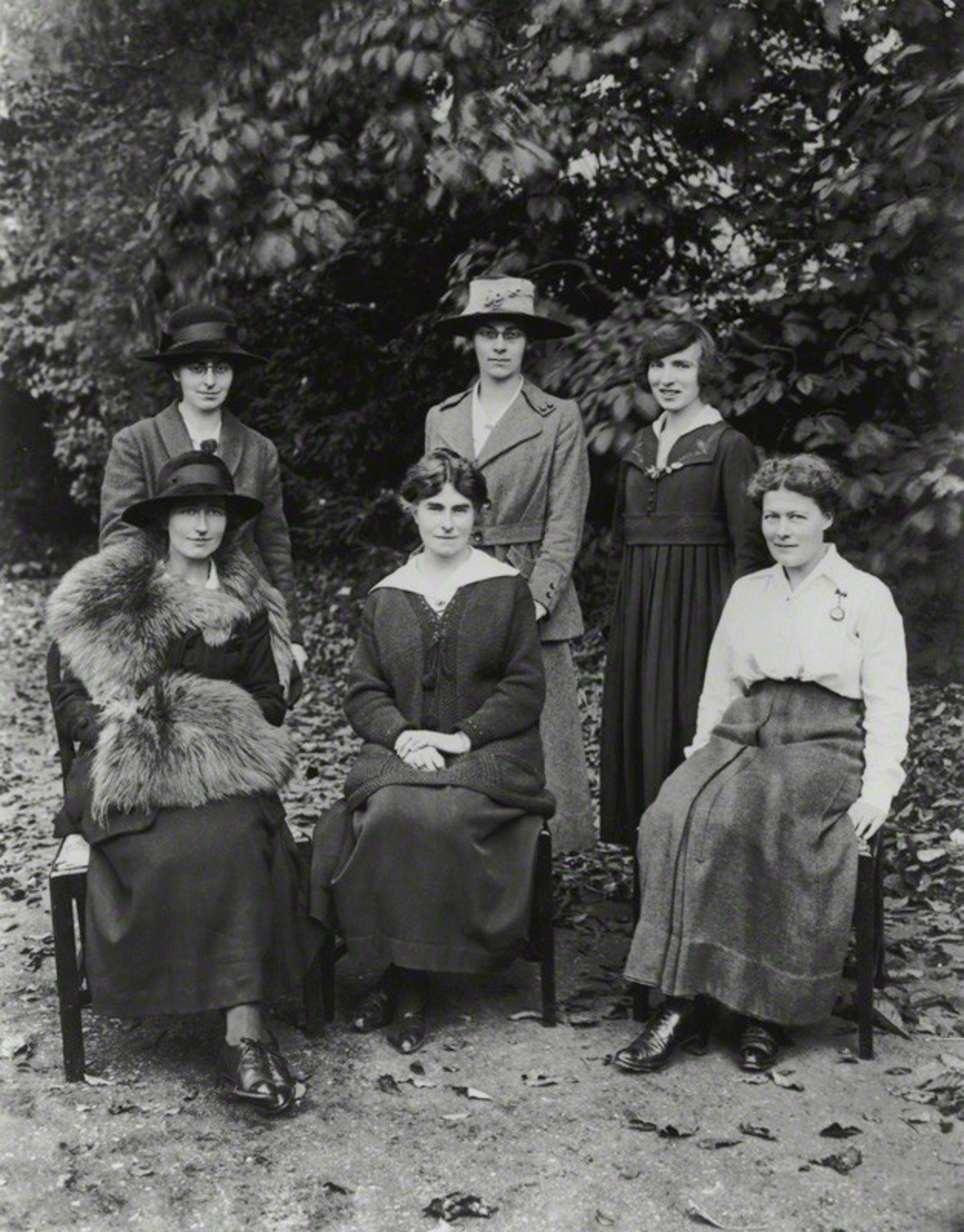
Staff of St Hilda's College, Oxford, including Elizabeth Levett, October 1919

But some Oxford dons welcomed the new influence. Professor Ernest Barker, for instance, taught both Elizabeth Levett and her gifted contemporary Maude Clarke before departing Oxford to become principal of King's College, London.

In her speciality of medieval economic history, Levett made use of archives in monasteries and local archives. Her style was known for its rigorous scholarship with attention to the minutest detail. In the Ewart lecture of 1916, Levett argued for "a stricter method, more rigidly exact in its collection of evidence." Her method, evident in her deeply researched works, was typical of her Oxford contemporaries, Levett noted. No detail should be left out, she said, "not even a mouse-trap, nor even, what is less, a peg for a harp."

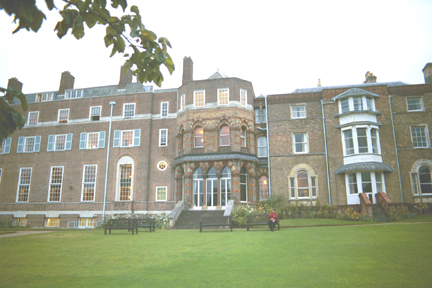
Library, St. Hilda's College, Oxford

Her most noted works are perhaps Studies in Manorial History and The Consumer in History, but she published scores of academic articles and monographs on medieval history—from the obscure details of feudalism to more sensational topics like the Black Death.

A student of the legal and social historian Sir Paul Vinogradoff at Oxford, Elizabeth Levett took up the methods of careful scrutiny of archival sources, and added an economic historian's insights. Her study on the Black Death was groundbreaking at the time, and her work on the manorial courts of St Albans was seminal in the field. (She died before publication of the St. Albans work.) Speaking of her former professor Vinogradoff, Levett said "he taught me to unify my varied interests... into the great framework of Economics and Jurisprudence, and to bring it to bear on practical social history."

This growing wellspring of women historians was especially evident in the Victoria History of the Counties of England, where much of the text was written by female medievalists like Levett, poring over contemporaneous medieval records of peasantry at the time. It was an approach that Levett herself advocated and embraced, and historians saw its impact on her own work.

In writing about the property rights of peasant women during medieval times, for instance, Levett described the sale of land completed while a distraught wife sobbed in court—described in the Latin of medieval records as lacrimentem in pleno halimoto. The transfer was later voided by the court after the husband's death because of the wife's protests, but it was accepted by the court at the time. By focusing on such particular incidents in the old records, Levett limned the societal rights (or lack of them) of medieval women, who were seen as subordinate tenants.

In addition to her carefully footnoted academic pieces, Levett delivered lectures and wrote articles on prostitution, on university women and religion, and on women in the postwar world. As her reputation grew, and strictures on women in academia loosened, Levett found that she was in great demand as a lecturer and writer. The award of a history chair at Westfield College crowned her career as one of a small number of emerging British women historians.

== Personal life and death ==
Elizabeth Levett died in 1932 at the age of 51 at the height of her professional career.

Levett's younger sister F. M. Jane Levett, early professor of logic at Glasgow University, also went on to an illustrious career. She is best known for her translation (as M.J. Levett) of Plato's Theaetetus. Jane Levett died at her cottage near Tenterden, Kent, not far from her Bodiam birthplace, in 1974.

== Published writings ==
- Europe Since Napoleon, London: Blackie, 1914. With introductory note by Richard Lodge.
- (with Adolphus Ballard) The Black Death, Oxford: Clarendon Press, 1916. Oxford studies in social and legal history, vol. 5. With a chapter contributed by Reginald Vivian Lennard.
- The Black Death on the estates of the see of Winchester. Oxford: Clarendon Press, 1916. Oxford studies in social and legal history, vol. 23. With a chapter contributed by Adolphus Ballard.
- 'The Courts and Court Rolls of St. Albans Abbey', Transactions of the Royal Historical Society, 1924.
- English Economic History, London: E. Benn, 1929. Benn's sixpenny library, no. 48.
- The Consumer in History, London: E. Benn, 1929. Self and society, no. 21.
- Studies in Manorial History, Oxford: Clarendon Press, 1938
