= Janet Upcott =

English housing manager (1888 – 1985)

Janet Mary Upcott (1888 – 6 December 1985) was an English social worker specialising in housing management. She managed housing estates in London and Chesterfield, and was a long-time contributor to the estates work of the National Trust.

== Life ==
Educated at Notting Hill and Ealing High School, Upcott studied at Somerville College, Oxford, where she received a BA when degrees opened to women in 1920. She then trained in social work at the London School of Economics. In 1910, she was trained as a housing manager by Octavia Hill, founder of the National Trust.

In the 1920s she became manager of a Ministry of Munitions housing estate, the Dudley estate. Her contributions there involved establishing a branch of the Women's Institute; helping the tenants to raise £130 to employ a district nurse; and running a boxing club.

In 1927, she was appointed manager of the St Augustine's Estate by Chesterfield Town Council. This was seen as a 'housing experiment of considerable significance' as Upcott was the first woman trained on the Octavia Hill system to be employed by a local authority.

In 1928 she organised a Conference of Women Municipal Managers, and she also gave lectures to other national women's associations.

From the 1910s until the 1940s, she was on the Finance and General Purposes Committee of the National Trust, remaining on the Estates Committee until the late 1960s.

Upcott House, a block of flats in Hackney, is named after Janet Upcott in recognition of her work as Hackney and Islington's housing manager.
