= Constance Savery =

British writer

- Savery in 1943
- Born: Constance Winifred Savery; 31 October 1897; Froxfield, Wiltshire, England
- Died: 2 March 1999 (aged 101); Stroud, Gloucestershire
- Education: Somerville College, Oxford
- Occupation: Writer
- Writing career
- Pen name: Another Lady; Elizabeth Cloberry
- Language: English
- Period: 1920–1999
- Genre: Children's literature
- Notable works: Emma (with Charlotte Brontë); Enemy Brothers; Emeralds for the King
- Website: constancesavery.com (bibliography)

Constance Winifred Savery (31 October 1897 – 2 March 1999) was a British writer of fifty novels and children's books, as well as many short stories and articles. She was selected for the initial issue of the long-running series entitled The Junior Book of Authors (1951–2008) and for the first, 1971, volume of Anne Commire's Something About the Author, which reached volume 320 in 2018. Savery's World War II novel, Enemy Brothers, received praise and remains in print. In 1980, at age eighty-two, she completed a Charlotte Brontë two-chapter fragment, which was published as "Emma by Charlotte Brontë and Another Lady". The book was translated into Dutch, Spanish, and Russian.

Reared in a Wiltshire vicarage, Savery was prepared for university study at King Edward VI High School for Girls in Birmingham. Earning an Exhibition (scholarship) to Somerville College, Oxford, she read English, and in 1920 was in the first group of women to be awarded a degree by the University of Oxford. Seventy-five years later, she was honoured at Oxford as the last surviving member of that event. Savery remained active to the end of a long life, completing a handwritten, 692-page revision of an unpublished manuscript just prior to her ninety-ninth birthday.

== Early life ==
Constance Winifred Savery was born on 31 October 1897, the first of the five daughters of Constance and John Manly Savery, vicar of All Saints Church, Froxfield, Wiltshire. As her mother's name was also Constance, she was Winifred everywhere except on the title pages of her books. By age ten she was filling scraps from waste paper baskets with short stories and poems. One was later incorporated into what she considered her best book, The Memoirs of Jack Chelwood. If that poem is included, she wrote something in every decade of the twentieth century that appeared eventually in print.

In 1907 the family moved to Birmingham, where Savery attended the King Edward VI High School for Girls. She entered Somerville College at the University of Oxford in 1917 and graduated in 1920 with Second Class Honours in English. After earning a teaching certificate from the University of Birmingham, she taught English at the King Edward VI Camp Hill School for Girls. When her mother died in 1925, she accepted her father's invitation to assist him at his new parish of Middleton-cum-Fordley near Saxmundham in Suffolk.

== Writing career ==
During vacations while attending Oxford, Savery wrote long melodramatic stories, which she labelled as trash, about suffering children undergoing psychological abuse from unfeeling guardians who were reclaimed in the last chapters by virtuous women. During the 1930s she wrote numerous short stories for Christian magazines, for broadcast on the BBC Children's Hour, and for lavishly illustrated children's annuals. A novel, Forbidden Doors, (1929) was published in England and, somewhat revised as Tenthragon (1930), in the United States. Both received respectful reviews. Tenthragon was succeeded by the first of many Christian books for children, Nicolas Chooses White May (1930), and two additional stories with children as protagonists, Pippin's House (1931) and Green Emeralds for the King (1938). She also wrote seven services of song, short narratives with interspersed hymns furnished by the publisher.

The onset of World War II brought paper shortages. Magazines shrank, the Christmas annuals disappeared, and publishers returned manuscripts because they did not have the paper to publish them. Americans had more paper, and Savery wrote nine successive children's books for Longmans, Green, & Co. in the United States. One of these, Enemy Brothers, has already been mentioned, and another, The Good Ship Red Lily, received praise and the Junior Scholastic Magazine Gold Seal Award in 1944. Junior Literary Guild Selections included Magic in My Shoes and The Reb and the Redcoats.

When the war was over, and paper was available again, Savery wrote to the Lutterworth Press offering them a story about a young girl forced to attend a strange school, King Arthur's, to board with a large family that lived in St. Matthew's Vicarage, and to commute to the school by train. Savery herself attended King Edward's School, came from a sizable family that lived in St. Mark's Vicarage, and also commuted by rail. The story, Redhead at School, had a Christian setting, but the Lutterworth editor asked for a more evangelical message, offering a fifty per cent increase in the stipend and an earlier publication date. Savery declined, and the book was published in 1951 as she wrote it. Subsequently, the Lutterworth Press accepted and published twenty-five additional Savery titles. These stories were advertised as reward books, gifts for worthy Sunday School students. Savery's were praised in the secular press for their characterisations and dialogue. Frequently reprinted, some were translated into German, French, Swedish, or Norwegian.

In addition to the Lutterworth stories, Savery wrote three Christian stories for Pickering & Inglis and four for the Victory Press, of which Blue Fields (1947), previously issued as a serial, was the most successful. As the protagonist is a self-punishing thirteen-year-old boy, the book is not appropriate for young children.

The most widely distributed of Savery's books was Emma (1980). Charlotte Brontë began the story, but died after writing only two chapters in which Emma is not identified. Savery completed the story and the publisher, J. M. Dent & Sons, accepted the story "by return of post". As published, seventeen pages were written by Brontë, the remaining 181 pages by Savery. The New York Times reviewer wrote, "If Emma had no connection with Charlotte Bronte, one might happily accept it on its own terms: the pellmell sequence of exciting events sustains attention and provides diversion," but it was not the book that Brontë would have written. Savery was identified only as Another Lady until the original book went out of print, but she was compensated by generous terms, excellent sales, and translations into Dutch, Spanish, and Russian. Only the Russian edition identified "Another Lady" as Constance Savery.

In 1918, Savery had written a short story, The Wyverne Chronicles, about a missionary family in China. It was extended in 1920 and 1921 with the addition of scapegrace Nick Urquhart, nicknamed Quicksilver, and by 1925 the story had become a novel. It was revisited in every year from 1926 to 1938 except 1928 and at least twenty more times between 1944 and 1968. It was turned down by the Lutterworth Press in 1951 and went to other publishers as late as 1977. It underwent five title changes before Savery settled on The Quicksilver Chronicle. By the end of her residence at Resthaven, Savery's eyesight permitted her to read, with a magnifying glass, one word at a time, in natural light, when the sun was highest. Nevertheless, she undertook a rewriting of Quicksilver despite an inability to read either her previous draft or what she was writing. So she wrote on widely spaced lines to prevent a line from falling on top of the line that preceded it. She completed her revision six weeks before her ninety-ninth birthday. When transcribed and printed, the novel was 215 pages long.

Prior to her death, Savery authorised the republication of The Reb and the Redcoats (1999) and Enemy Brothers (2001). The book that Savery considered her best, The Memoirs of Jack Chelwood, was privately printed after her death.

=== Distinguishing features ===
With few exceptions, when Savery was not writing for children, she was writing about children, and even in her reward books with an evangelical editor looking over her shoulder, her children came alive on the page. Reviews praise her prose and characterisations.

She wrote to instruct and to inspire. When she wrote "His good and middlingly good characters are ten times more alive than his… villains," to describe Talbot Baines Reed, she was describing her own fiction as well, and as with Elizabeth Goudge, a contemporary, her antagonists rarely received retribution. Many of her books feature large families, and love between siblings is central to her better books, even when the siblings are in conflict.

Because a small difference in age makes a great difference to children, twins abound. In some books, such as Green Emeralds for the King, the twins oppose each other. In other books, such as Four Wonders for Wyn, they cooperate. In Moonshine in Candle Street, the twins, like Samneric in Lord of the Flies, function as a single character. In other stories, such as Gilly's Tower, the twin plays no part, but he or she is mentioned, because Savery wrote twins into her stories. Forbidden Doors and Magic in My Shoes feature triplets.

Although she began writing seriously in the 1920s and 1930s, her books avoid the racial stereotyping of that era. Two later books, The Royal Caravan and The Drifting Sands, challenge racism, and Three Houses in Beverley Road counters anti-Semitism.

== Personal life and recognition ==
Following her mother's death in 1925, Savery accepted her father's invitation to assist him at his new parish of Middleton-cum-Fordley near Saxmundham in Suffolk. When her father retired from Middleton in 1930, he purchased Trevalfry, a semi-detached house up the coast in Reydon near Southwold. After his death in 1939, Savery remained at Trevalfry with a chronically ill sister, Phyllis, until 17 May 1977, when the sisters moved to Cherry Trees, a cottage in Dumbleton, Gloucestershire, near Evesham. That April, aged 79, she toured the Holy Land with her sister Doreen.

Following the death of Phyllis and the publication of Emma (1980), Savery was joined in Dumbleton by another sister, Christine. Limited mobility kept both sisters at home, where Savery wrote unpublished novels for Doreen during her terminal illness. When Christine's medical problems increased, requiring that she move in 1989 to Resthaven, a nursing home near Stroud, Savery accompanied her. Handicapped by arthritis and partial blindness, Savery continued to write, although her Christian novels no longer found publishers.

In 1995, the University of Oxford celebrated the seventy-fifth anniversary of the awarding of degrees to women, and Savery attended as a guest of honour. She was invited back to Oxford in May 1996 and in October 1997, just prior to her 100th birthday. She died on 2 March 1999. A single headstone, with her epitaph on one side and her sister Christine's on the other, marks their graves in the Pitchcombe graveyard near Resthaven. Christine, Doreen, and Phyllis Savery were also published authors.

In common with half of her Somerville classmates, Savery did not marry and in a letter to a correspondent reported having received only one compliment from a gentleman in her life: "You have a very nice mouth" – but as the gentleman was a dentist, it was a professional statement.

== Collections of Savery's papers ==
- The Constance Savery papers at the Knight Library, University of Oregon, include most of Savery's manuscripts, published and unpublished, her work diaries, and her correspondence with publishers.
- The Savery collection at the de Grummond Children's Literature Collection, University of Southern Mississippi, includes over three thousand family letters with their digital transcripts, children's annuals containing most of Savery's short stories for children, and book proofs from her American publisher.

== Bibliography ==
=== Adult novels ===
- Forbidden Doors (1929)
- Tenthragon (1930)
- Emma (1980; with Charlotte Brontë)
- The Memoirs of Jack Chelwood (2004; posthumous)

=== Children's literature ===
- Pippin's House (1931)
- Moonshine in Candle Street (1937)
- Green Emeralds for the King (1938)
- Enemy Brothers (1943)
- The Good Ship Red Lily (1944)
- Emeralds for the King (1945)
- Dark House on the Moss (1949)
- Redhead at School (1951)
- Welcome, Santza (1956)
- Magic in My Shoes (1958)
- The Reb and the Redcoats (1961)

=== Sunday school reward books ===
- Three Houses in Beverley Road (1950)
- Meg Plays Fair (1953)
- Young Elizabeth Green (1954)
- Five Wonders for Wyn (1955)
- Tabby Kitten (1956)
- In Apple Alley (1958)
- To the City of Gold (1958)
- The Sea Urchins (1959)
- Rebel Jacqueline (1960)
- All Because of Sixpence (1961)
- The White Kitling (1962)
- The Royal Caravan (1963)
- Breton Holiday (1963)
- Joric and the Dragon (1964)
- Please Buy My Pearls (1965)
- The Sea Queen (1965)
- The Golden Cap (1966)
- The Strawberry Feast (1967)
- The Silver Angel (1968)
- Lavender's Tree (1969)
- Gilly's Tower (1969)
- The Sapphire Ring (1969)
- The City of Flowers (1970)
- The Drifting Sands (1971)

=== Picture book ===
- Four Lost Lambs (1957)

=== Evangelical children's books ===
- Nicholas Chooses White May (1930)
- Yellow Gates (1935)
- Danny and the Alabaster Box (1937)
- Peter of Yellow Gates (1945)
- Up a Winding Stair (1949)
- Scarlet Plume (1953)
- The Boy from Brittany (1957)
- Flight to Freedom (1958)
- Thistledown Tony (1958)

=== Evangelical books for adults ===
- Blue Fields (1947)
- Sir Dominic's Scapegrace (1947; as Elizabeth Cloberry)

=== Drama ===
- No King But Christ (1976)

=== Short story collection ===
- There Was a Key (1930)

=== Services of song ===
- The Christmas Flower Shop (1932)
- Gifts of Gold (1935)
- In His Steps (1935; adaptation of novel by C. M. Sheldon)
- God's Promises (1936)
- His Brother's Keeper (1936; adaptation of novel by C. M. Sheldon)
- The Christmas Cloak (1937)
- White Unto Harvest (1938)

=== Biographies ===
- She Went Alone: Mary Bird of Persia (1942)
- Bishop Guy Bullen (1948)
- God's Arctic Adventurer: The Story of William Bompas (1973)
