= Agnes Cuming =

English librarian (b. 1890)

Agnes Cuming (1890–1962) was an Irish-born English philosopher and the first librarian of the University of Hull (1929–1955). She was one of the first wave of women librarians at university colleges, and was responsible for protecting the book collection during the Hull Blitz in World War II. Although the library had no purpose-built building for her 27-year tenure, by the end it had a collection of 125,000 books and 11 staff. Her successor was the poet Philip Larkin.

== Education and philosophy ==
Agnes Cuming was born in Dublin on 29 September 1890. Her parents were Edward Cuming, a barrister and King's Counsel, and Kathleen, née O'Rorke.

She studied Mental and Moral Science at University College Dublin, gaining a BA in 1910 as one of two women to graduate in her class that year. She received the joint highest marks in the year. She received an MA in 1911 and a Travelling Studentship in Philosophy in 1912 as the first woman to gain these distinctions from University College Dublin.

Her main contribution to philosophy was 'Lotze, Bradley and Bosanquet', a 1917 article on German idealist philosopher Hermann Lotze and the British idealists F. H. Bradley and Bernard Bosanquet.

She was also one of the first women admitted to degrees at Oxford in 1920, receiving a BSc as a member of the Society of Oxford Home Students.

== Librarianship ==
=== Oxford and Aberystwyth ===
During World War I, while studying for her BSc at the University of Oxford, Cuming was appointed temporary Senior Assistant at the Bodleian Library. She left in August 1920 to take up a post at the University Library at the University College of Wales, Aberystwyth.

=== Hull ===
Cuming became the Librarian of University College, Hull on 11 February 1929, a month before its opening. For the first ten years of the Library's operation, it had only four staff and was spread across disconnected rooms in one of the University's two buildings.

During the bombing raids on Hull in World War II, Cuming redistributed the book stock outside of the city to protect it from damage. 32,000 books were spread across eight institutions, and local clergy stored books in their houses, including one rectory which stored 5,000 books.

The library gained a deputy librarian in October 1948, at which point the library had six staff. In 1951, its first issue desk was installed, and stairs were constructed to replace the hand-operated book lift connecting the two floors of the library.

Cuming retired in March 1955, the year after Hull gained university status. She lived in Oxford after her retirement, and died on 8 March 1962.

== Legacy ==
University College Dublin held an annual/biannual Agnes Cuming Lecture in Philosophy until 2019 and has an Agnes Cuming Seminar Room.
