= Constance Ottley =

British surgeon (1898–1981)

Constance Mary Ottley FRCS (1898–1981) was a British surgeon.

== Life ==
She was born in May 1898 in Hampstead, the eldest of four daughters of Canon Roger Ottley and his wife Mary, née Alexander. Her mother, known as May, attended Somerville College, Oxford. May and Constance were both responsible for preserving the papers of their family friend Walter Pater.

Educated at home, Constance joined the University of Oxford as part of the Society of Home Students, later St Anne's College. She was one of the first women to receive a degree from Oxford when these were opened to women in 1920. She then secured the Oxford Gilchrist scholarship to the London Hospital and trained under James Sherren and A. J. Walton. She received her BM and BCh from Oxford in 1922.

Ottley held positions as receiving room officer at the London Hospital and house physician at York County Hospital. After registration as a surgeon, she worked as house surgeon at the South London Hospital for Women, consultant surgeon to the Brighton Group of Hospitals, and surgeon to the local branch of the St John Ambulance. She was elected a Fellow of the Royal College of Surgeons in 1928.

Ottley was the author of several scientific articles and, with C. F. Marshall, a translation from Hungarian of a book on the diseases of domestic animals.

She died at Hove, Sussex, in May 1981.
