= Margaret Hobling =

British archaeologist (1897–1977)

Margaret Blanche Hobling (1897 – 1977) was a British archaeologist and Quaker theologian.

== Biography ==
In 1917, she studied at Somerville College, Oxford under Hilda Lorimer. She received her degree in 1920 when Oxford began awarding degrees to women.

In 1924, as a student at the British School at Athens, Hobling joined A. M. Woodward’s archaeological excavation at Sparta. She supervised the excavation of the Sanctuary of Athena Chalkioikos, assisted by Winifred Lamb, and was responsible for publishing the findings.

Later, Hobling lectured at the University of Birmingham and at Woodbrooke Quaker Study Centre. In 1957, Hobling served as a Quaker delegate to the British Council of Churches on the subject of nuclear force. The editor of Friends’ Quarterly, Hobling, produced several talks and publications on Quaker theology and ethics and delivered the Swarthmore Lecture in 1958.

== Publications ==
- Woodward, A.M. and Hobling, M.B. 1925. 'Excavations at Sparta, 1924-25: 4. The Acropolis. The Site.' ABSA 26: 240-252.
- Hobling, M.B. 1925. 'Excavations at Sparta, 1924-25: 5. Greek Relief-ware from Sparta.' ABSA 26: 277-310.
