= Gertrude Winifred Taylor =

British author (b. 1882/3)

Gertrude Winifred Taylor (1880 – 1948) was a British author of novels and history.

== Life ==
She was born in London in 1880 to Horatio Taylor, and had at least five brothers. (Note: Bogen says Taylor was born in 1882 or 1883 but notes "I have guessed her birth date from the dates that she attended St Hilda's Hall.") Educated at Notting Hill High School, she studied modern history at St Hilda's College, Oxford from 1899 – 1902 and eventually received her degree in 1920.

With her friend and fellow Oxford graduate Dorothy Katherine Broster, Taylor wrote two novels: Chantermarle: A Romance of the Vendean War (1911) and The Vision Splendid (1913). Her solo works included religious plays and a university novel, The Pearl (1917), which explores issues of class and gender in the religious experience of an Oxford undergraduate. She also finished a history begun by her late brother Frank, which was published as The Wars of Marlborough 1702 – 1709 (1921). She also worked as a teacher. She died in 1948.
