= Fred Whishaw =

Russian-born English novelist, poet, historian and musician

- Born: Frederick James Whishaw; 14 March 1854; St. Petersburg, Russia
- Died: 8 July 1934 (aged 80); Slapton, Devon, England
- Occupations: Writer; historian; musician
- Spouse: Ethel Charlotte Moberly
- Children: Gwendolen Elsie Moberly Whishaw
- Relatives: Winifred Moberly (sister-in-law)
- Writing career
- Pen name: Fred Whishaw, Frederick J. Whishaw
- Genres: Historical fiction, adventure fiction, children's literature

Frederick James Whishaw (14 March 1854 – 8 July 1934) was a Russian-born British novelist, historian, poet and musician. A popular author of children's fiction at the turn of the 20th century, he published over forty volumes of his work between 1884 and 1914.

He was a prolific historical novelist, many of his books being set in Czarist Russia, and his "schoolboy" and adventure serials appeared in many boys' magazines of the era. Several of these were published as full-length novels, such as Gubbins Minor and Some Other Fellows (1897), The Boys of Brierley Grange (1906) and The Competitors: A Tale of Upton House School (1906). Other stories, such as The White Witch of the Matabele (1897) or The Three Scouts: A Story of the Boer War (1900), depicted colonial Africa.

Whishaw was also one of the first translators of Fyodor Dostoevsky. He had several of the Russian author's novels published between 1886 and 1888.

== Biography ==
Frederick James Whishaw was born in Saint Petersburg, Russian Empire, to English-born parents, Bernard Whishaw of Cheltenham and Isabel Maria Cattley, on 14 March 1854; he was one of eight children. His family had been in the Russian Empire since the 18th century. Eight weeks after his birth, his parents moved the family back to Great Britain and settled in Paignton, Devon where Whishaw would spend much of his childhood. He was educated at Leamington College and then at Uppingham where became an accomplished sportsman and tenor. He was also popular among his classmates for the food hampers he often received from Russia.

At age 16, Whishaw left school and returned to St. Petersburg to work for an office firm. He spent much of his recreational time running and rowing. He also had a collection of verses, Loves of the Flowers, published in 1878. Unhappy with his occupation, Whishaw left Hills & Whishaw and eventually emigrated to England after his marriage to Ethel Charlotte Moberly on 30 March 1880. Their first and only child, Gwendolen, was born on 13 January 1884. Returning to his childhood home of Paignton, he began a career as a musician and soon became a well-known and successful tenor.

During this time, he also began translating the work of Fyodor Dostoevsky which was published by Henry Vizetelly between 1886 and 1888. His efforts eventually resulted in many of Dostoevsky's novels being made available for English-language readers in Victorian Britain for the first time.

Whishaw was soon inspired to try his hand at writing and had his semi-autobiography, Out of Doors in Tsarland: A Record of the Seeings and Doings of a Wanderer in Russia, published in 1893. A year later, his wrote his first children's novel, Boris the Bear-Hunter, followed by ten more novels between 1895 and 1898, including his first collection of English "schoolboy" stories, Gubbins Minor and Some Other Fellows. These and other stories were published as popular serials in many boys' adventure magazines throughout his career.

His schoolboy stories were a mix of gentle humour and more serious themes of public school life such as theft, house matches, and other common behaviour of the time. It was his Russian-themed children's adventure stories and historical novels for which he was best known. Several of these stories took place in other parts of the world, such as colonial Africa, as seen in The White Witch of the Matabele (1897), and focused on then-current events like The Three Scouts: A Story of the Boer War (1900). Whishaw also wrote several books on Russian history, most notably the well-received Moscow: A Story of the French Invasion of 1812 in 1905. He wrote his final novel, A Bespoken Bride, in 1914 though many of his earlier stories continued to be reprinted for years afterwards. Whishaw died at his home in Slapton, Devon on 8 July 1934.

== Bibliography ==
- Loves of the Flowers (1878)
- Out of Doors in Tsarland: A Record of the Seeings and Doings of a Wanderer in Russia (1893)
- Boris the Bear-Hunter (1895)
- A Lost Army: A Tale of the Russians in Central Asia (1895)
- The Romance of the Wood (1895)
- My Terrible Twin (1896)
- Harold the Norseman (1896)
- The Emperors Englishman (1896)
- Lost in African Jungles (1896)
- A Boyar of the Terrible: A Romance of the Court of Ivan the Cruel, First Tsar of Russia (1896)
- Sons of Freedom, or The Fugitives from Siberia (1897)
- A Tsar's Gratitude (1897)
- The Adventures of a Stowaway (1897)
- Elsie's Magician (1897)
- The White Witch of the Matabele (1897)
- A Russian Vagabond (1898)
- Bates and His Bicycle (1898)
- A Race for Life (1898)
- Called Back to Tsarland (1899)
- The Three Scouts: A Story of the Boer War (1900)
- Gunpowder Treason and Plot, and Other Stories for Boys (1901, co-written with Harold Avery and Richard Townshend)
- A Forbidden Name (1901)
- The Lion Cub: A Story of Peter the Great (1902)
- A Secret of Berry Pomeroy (1902)
- Mazeppa (1902)
- The Diamond of Evil (1902)
- Near the Tas, Near Death (1903)
- The Yellow Satchel (1903)
- A Splendid Impostor (1903)
- Lost Sir Brian (1903)
- Lovers at Fault (1904)
- The Tiger of Muscovy (1904)
- Countess Ida (1904)
- A Grand Duke of Russia (1905)
- Moscow: A Story of the French Invasion of 1812 (1905)
- The Informer (1905)
- Her Highness (1906)
- King by Combat (1906)
- The Boys of Brierley Grange (1906)
- The Competitors: A Tale of Upton House School (1906)
- A Russian Coward (1906)
- The Great Green God (1906)
- The Secret Syndicate (1907)
- The Madness of Gloria (1907)
- The Persecuted (1907)
- A New Cinderella (1908)
- The Revolt of Beatrix (1908)
- A Royal Hoax (1908)
- The Luck of the Czar (1908)
- The Vortex (1909)
- The Degenerate (1909)
- A Village Temptress (1909)
- An Empress in Love (1910)
- The Heart of Noel (1910)
- The Caxborough Scandal (1910)
- Clutterbuck's Treasure (1910)
- Peter the Great: A Novel (1911)
- Gubbins Minor, and Some Other Fellows (1913)
- Nathalia: A Tale (1913)
- A Bespoken Bride (1914)
