= Sybil Goulding =

British literary critic (1897–1971)

Goulding in 1928, from a photo of the St Hugh's College council.

Sybil Maud West (née Goulding; 1897 – 21 April 1971) was a British literary critic and academic. The daughter of a bank manager, she was a childhood friend of the writer Winifred Holtby and wrote and performed plays with her. After being educated at Bridlington High School, she entered Somerville College, Oxford, to study French in 1914. She received first class honours and was one of the first women to be admitted to degrees at Oxford when they were awarded in 1920.

She gained her MA in Paris, and worked as a registry assistant at the League of Nations in 1919. By 1928, she had returned to Oxford, and was working at St Hugh’s College, Oxford, where she was serving on the College council as an official fellow. In 1931, she married Rawden Henry Pitt West, an officer in the Royal Marines.

As a literary critic, Goulding specialised in the French reception of English literature. She was the author of Swift en France, which was published by Champion in 1924 as volume 15 of Bibliothèque de la Revue de littérature comparée.
