= Ierne L. Plunket =

English historian and children's author (1885 – 1970)

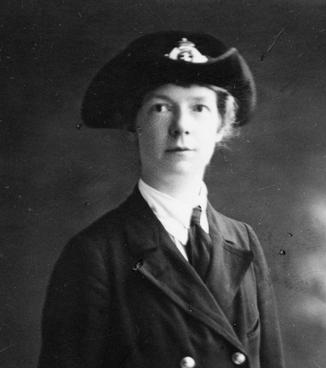
Plunket in WRNS uniform, 1918

Ierne Arthur Lifford Plunket FRHistS (1885–1970) was a British author of medieval history and children's books.

== Biography ==
Ierne was born in Cookham on 9 May 1885, the ninth child of Arthur Cecil Crampton Plunket, a younger son of John Plunket, 3rd Baron Plunket, and his wife Louisa Hewitt. Educated at Queen Anne's School and Oxford High School, she studied with the Society of Oxford Home Students, and received her MA when Oxford began admitting women to degrees in 1920.

In 1917, she served at Scottish Women's Hospitals in Russia. She served with the Women's Royal Naval Service in 1918 in recruiting.

From 1915, she began writing books of medieval history, with the aim to "make Mediaeval Europe live", and with a particular focus on Spain.

After the war, she worked as a history lecturer at University College, Southampton, and then began writing adventure and school stories for children.

She died at Royal Tunbridge Wells on 11 April 1970.

== Select works ==
- Fall of the Old Order (1909)
- Isabel of Castile (1915)
- Europe in the Middle Ages (1922)
- Stories from Mediaeval Spain (1923)
- At the Sign of the Windmill (1924)
- Sally Cocksure (1929)
