= Eva Dykes Spicer =

English missionary educator in China (1898 – 1974)

Eva Dykes Spicer MBE (1898 – 1974) was an English missionary educator in China. She spent twenty-eight years as a teacher at Ginling College, Nanjing, negotiating the turbulence of the Second Sino-Japanese war and the increasing hostility against the teaching of religion and against foreign residents in China. She then worked as the principal of a women's school in Nigeria.

== Early life and training ==
Spicer was born on 29 May 1898 at Lancaster Gate, London, the ninth of eleven children of Sir Albert Spicer, 1st Baronet, a Liberal MP, and his wife Jessie, née Dykes.

Educated at Norland Place School and St Leonards boarding school in St Andrews, in 1917 she studied history at Somerville College, Oxford. She received a BA from there the first year degrees were admitted to women in 1920. At university she was involved in the Student Christian Movement and was elected Senior Student of her college in her final year.

Having wanted to be a missionary since she was a child, she applied to the London Missionary Society soon after graduating. She received teacher training at the London Day Training College and at Mansfield College before departing for China in August 1923.

== Ginling College ==
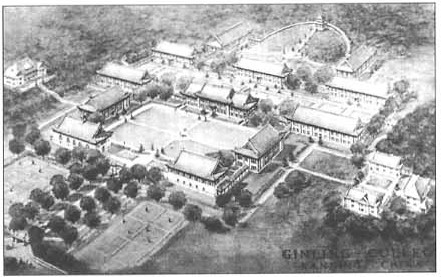
Ginling College in 1921

Spicer taught at the women's Christian college, Ginling College, Nanjing, from 1923 to 1951. Her first year was spent in learning Chinese; she then became Religious Studies teacher, teaching Old Testament studies, the life of Christ, and Christian social and ethical teachings, and also advising the college branch of the Young Women's Christian Association.

Spicer began to see the results of unrest in China in the May Thirtieth Movement in 1925. In March 1927, she and other foreign staff had to escape the college when troops of Chiang Kai-Shek’s Northern Expedition entered Nanjing, and sought out and killed foreign residents. The Chinese staff of Ginling, and an army officer who was the brother of one of the students, helped the foreign staff escape to the American and British gunboats on the Yangtze River, who evacuated them to Shanghai. Spicer took an early furlough and returned to the UK.

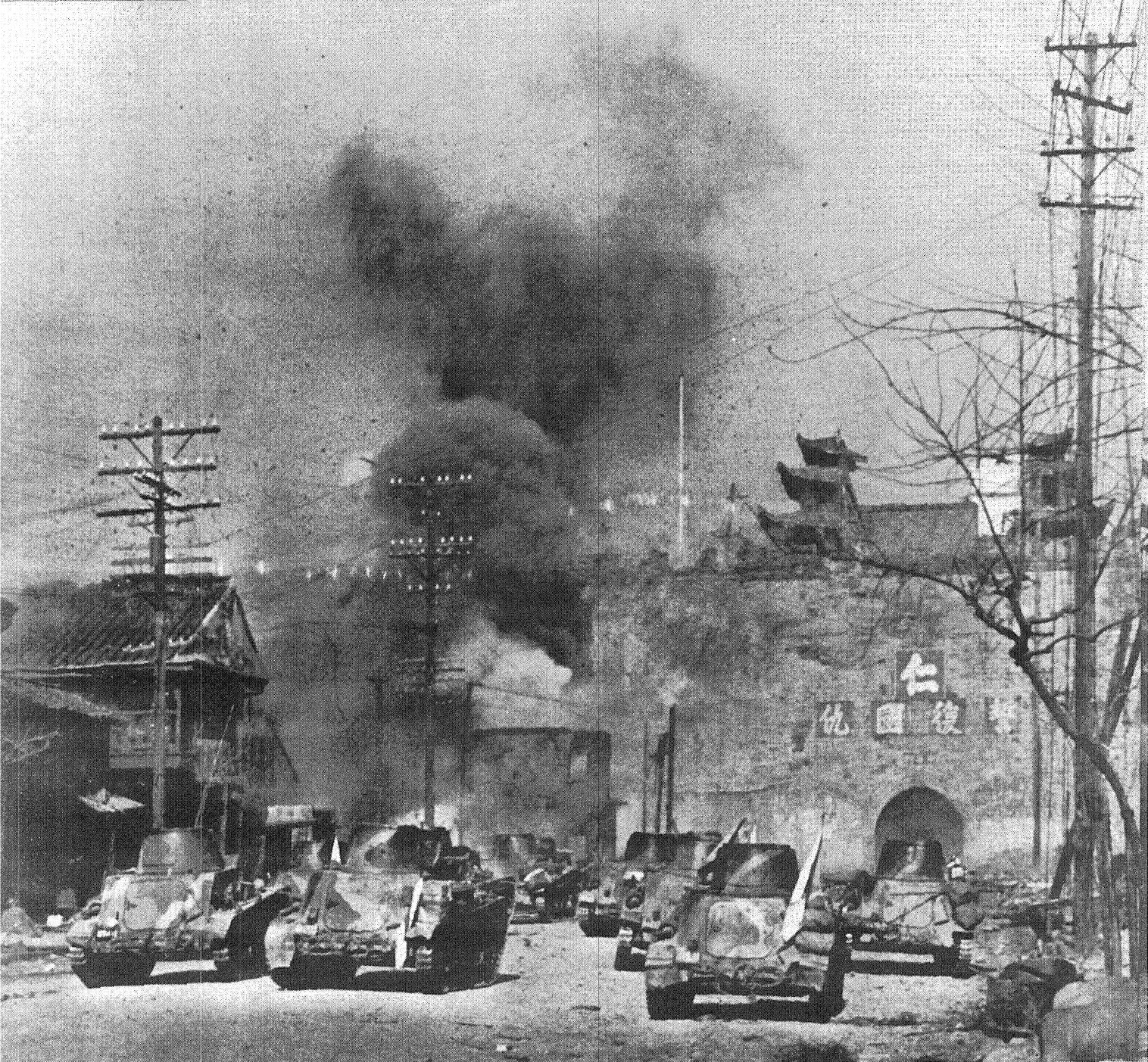
Nanjing was captured by Japanese forces in December 1937

When Spicer returned to Ginling in September 1928, the college had to register with the ministry of education of the Nationalist Government. The new regulations required the religion department to be disbanded, so Spicer's courses continued in the department of philosophy. The Japanese invasion of Manchuria in 1931 led to renewed calls for the removal of foreign staff, with Spicer one of the few to remain.

In July 1937, the college was dispersed across several locations when the Sino-Japanese War threatened Nanjing. The city fell to the Japanese in December, and the college was part of the agreed Safety Zone, harbouring thousands of women and children. In 1938, the college was relocated to Chengdu, where it was hosted by the West China Union University. Spicer arrived there in September. In December 1938, Spicer served as one of the delegates from China at the International Missionary Council at Chennai, India.

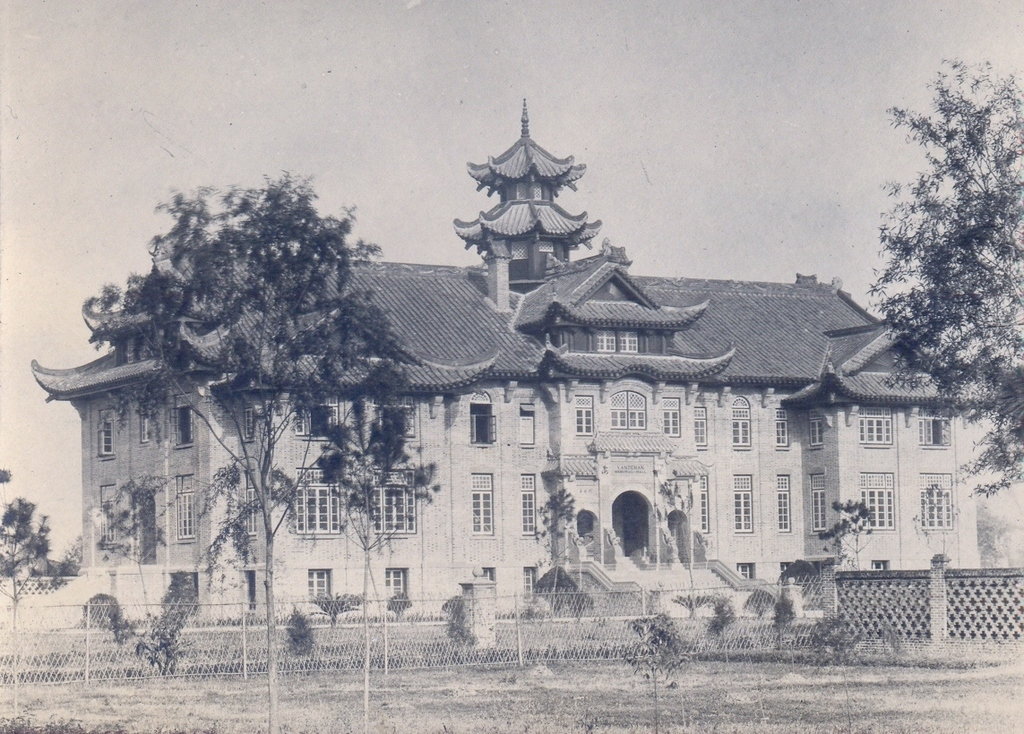
The West China Union University (pictured in 1920) hosted Ginling College while it was in exile from Nanjing

After a second furlough in 1940, Spicer returned in February 1942, having been delayed on her return journey by war in the Pacific. Ginling had now also been required to close its philosophy department, and Spicer was allowed to teach one course in the sociology of religion while being mainly a history teacher. She also taught a course in comparative religion at Nanjing Theological Seminary. She chaired three committees: the Advisory Committee for Joint Religious Activities of the different institutions at WCUU, the Committee for Student Evangelism in Isolated Universities, and the Sino-British Cultural Association.

Ginling College returned to its premises in Nanjing, which had been looted of much of its books and equipment, in 1946. After supporting her older sisters in London in 1947–8, Spicer had her final stint at Ginling from August 1948 until she had to depart in 1951, after the Communist takeover.

== After Ginling ==
Spicer decided against taking another missionary position in South-East Asia as she did not want to encroach on the position of her former college head at Ginling, Wu Yi-Fang. From April 1952 until her retirement in 1958, Spicer worked as Principal of the Women's Training College at Umuahai, Nigeria. She was appointed MBE in 1959.

In 1972–3 Spicer served as Chairman of the London Congregational Union. She was also involved in the Society for the Ministry of Women in the Church, and with visiting Ginling alumni in Canada and the USA.

She died in London on 28 May 1974.
