= Harriett M. Allyn =

American zoologist, anthropologist, and college administrator

Dr. Harriett May Allyn
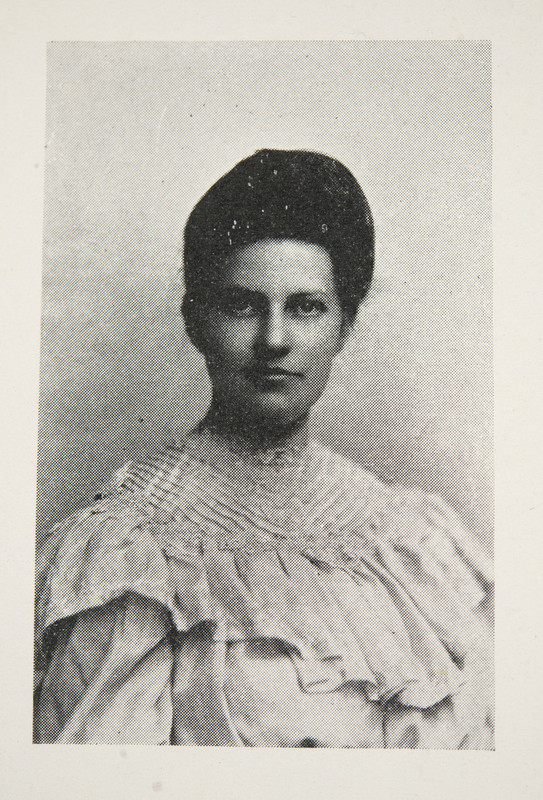
- Born: May 4, 1883; New London, Connecticut
- Died: July 7, 1957 (aged 74)
- Education: Mount Holyoke College; University of Chicago
- Occupations: Zoologist, anthropologist, college administrator
- Employer: Mount Holyoke College
- Organization(s): National Association of Deans of Women (President 1937–1939); American Council of Guidance and Personnel Associations (President 1940–1942)
- Known for: First academic dean of Mount Holyoke College

Harriett M. Allyn (4 May 1883 – 7 July 1957) was an American zoologist, anthropologist, and college administrator. She was the first academic dean of Mount Holyoke College, appointed in 1929.

== Early life ==
Harriett May Allyn was born in New London, Connecticut in 1883, one of four children born to Charles and Helen Louisa Starr Allyn. She attended high school at the Williams Memorial Institute, before enrolling at Mount Holyoke College. There, she was an active participant in a number of student government organizations. An entry for Allyn in the 1905 Mount Holyoke yearbook reads:

To grind Harriett is to "pursue things unattempted yet in prose or rhyme". How could one adequately tell of Harriett's services as Assiduous Self Rusher, Sergeant-at-Arms, Class President, and President of the Y.W.C.A. As an idol of the stage, Harriett is well known, Whether she is Jenkins the butler, John Perrybingle, or Captain Absolute, all lose their hearts to her—even members of the faculty succumb.

Allyn graduated from Mount Holyoke in 1905, going on to obtain her Master's and Ph.D., at the University of Chicago in zoology and biology.

== Career ==
Allyn began her teaching career at Lake Erie and Vassar Colleges, followed by Hackett Medical College in Canton, China, where she was dean for eight years, 1915–1923. Allyn made the move to China with a friend, the daughter of Hackett's founder Martha Hackett. There, she taught zoology and pre-medical subjects, and worked alongside Dr. Hackett to try to keep the college for, and run by, women.

In Canton, she also acted as director of the Chan Kwang School, and chairman of the China division of the administrative committee of the Young Women's Christian Association National Board.

Allyn returned to the United States in 1923, where she taught for a year at Illinois' Monticello Seminary. She then returned to Vassar College, working as a zoology instructor. During this period, Allyn's interest in archaeology and anthropology grew, leading ultimately to the establishment of anthropology teaching as Vassar. In 1928, she was offered the post of academic dean at Mount Holyoke College, accepting on the condition that an anthropology course be established.

Allyn took a year's leave before taking up the position, studying at the Smithsonian, and as a fellow at Yale, under anthropologist George Grant MacCurdy. In 1929, she joined British archeologist Dorothy Garrod's excavation team at Mount Carmel as a representative of the American School of Prehistoric Research with Dr. Martha Hackett.

Allyn began work as the first academic dean of Mount Holyoke College in 1929, where she served as professor of anthropology and head of academic administration until her retirement in 1948. As she had previously done in Canton, Allyn actively worked throughout the 1930s to preserve female leadership at Mount Holyoke College.

Allyn travelled widely, and took part in a number of archaeological expeditions, including in Palestine (sponsored by Yale University and the British School of Archaeology): in Czechoslovakia (under the Czech State Archaeological Survey); and in Hungary (directed by the Budapest Museum). In 1936, Allyn was the only US woman delegate to meetings of the International Congress of Prehistoric and Protohistoric Sciences in Oslo, Norway, selected by the State Department. Her travels inspired her efforts to promote scholarships for foreign students. By the time of Allyn's retirement, nine full annual scholarships for foreign students had been established.

Allyn served as President of the National Association of Deans of Women 1937–1939, having been Vice President 1933–1935. She was President of the American Council of Guidance and Personnel Associations 1940–1942.

== Retirement and death ==
Allyn retired in 1948, after 19 years as dean at Mount Holyoke. She was made a dean-emeritus and awarded an honorary doctor of law degree. In her retirement, Allyn lived in Los Angeles and South Hadley. She continued to travel internationally, as well as to lecture across the United States on educational topics.

Harriett May Allyn died of a heart attack in Los Angeles at the age of 74. She was buried in Cedar Grove Cemetery, New London, Connecticut.
