= Mary Sturt =

Mary Sturt (8 September 1896 – 1993), also known as Molly, was a British educational psychologist and historian of education.

== Life ==
Sturt studied classics at Somerville College, Oxford from 1916 and graduated in 1920.

She later served as Vice-Principal of St Mary's College, Bangor, an Anglican teacher-training college for women.

She collaborated with Ellen Oakden in several pieces of writing. Their Modern Psychology and Education (1926) was welcomed by its Observer reviewer as "one of the most informative, interesting, and humorous things that I have ever seen as an attempt to write for training-college students". They also adapted works for children for 'The King's Treasuries of Literature', a series edited by Arthur Quiller-Couch: The Canterbury Pilgrims bowdlerised some of the bawdier elements of the Canterbury Tales.

Sturt's biography of Francis Bacon defended Bacon against Macaulay, whom she characterised as "a man writing in semi-ignorance to please the most hypocritical audience that ever existed". On retirement she taught for a year in Sarawak in Borneo.

== Works ==
- (with E. C. Oakden) 'The development of the knowledge of time in children', British Journal of Psychology, vol. 12 (1922), pp. 309–336
- The psychology of time, London: K. Paul, Trench, Trubner & Co., Ltd, 1925. 'The International Library of Psychology, Philosophy and Scientific Method' series.
- (with E. C. Oakden) Pattern plays, a book of plays and play-making, 1925. 'Teaching of English' series, no. 20.
- (with E. C. Oakden) Modern psychology and education : a text-book of psychology for students in training colleges and adult evening classes, 1926
- (with E. C. Oakden) Matter and method in education, 1928
- (with E. C. Oakden) Growing up : How One did it in Different Times and Places, 1930
- Francis Bacon: a biography, 1932
- The education of children under seven, 1932
- (with E. C. Oakden) The Canterbury pilgrims, being Chaucers Canterbury tales retold for children, 1937. 'The King's Treasuries of Literature' series.
- Practical ethics: a sketch of the moral structure of society, 1949
- The education of the people: a history of primary education in England and Wales in the nineteenth century, 1967
- (with E. C. Oakden) Minstral tales. 'The King's Treasuries of Literature' series.
- (with E. C. Oakden) The knights of the Faery Queen: tales retold from Spenser. 'The King's Treasuries of Literature' series.
