= Julia de Lacy Mann =

English economic historian

Julia de Lacy Mann (22 August 1891 – 23 May 1985) was an English economic historian. She was principal of St Hilda's College, Oxford, for 27 years, from 1928 to 1955.

== Early life and education ==
Julia de Lacy Mann was born in London on 22 August 1891, the daughter of James Saumarez Mann, a classical scholar, and Amy Bowman Mann, the daughter of a classical scholar. Julia's only sibling, James Saumarez Mann, was killed by a sniper in Iraq in 1920.

Like her grandfather, father, and brother, Julia de Lacy Mann read classics, from 1910 to 1914, at Somerville College, Oxford. She earned a social science certificate from the London School of Economics in 1915. After World War I, she returned to Somerville for further study and a diploma in economics.

== Career ==
Mann worked briefly at the University Women's Settlement in Southwark, London, in 1914. During World War I, Mann worked as a clerk at the Foreign Office. She was assigned as a staff member at the 1919 Paris Peace Conference. After the war, her career was mainly in academia, beginning as an economics tutor at St Hilda's College in 1923. She was principal of St Hilda's from 1928 until she retired from that position in 1955.

Mann was assistant editor of the Economic History Review from 1927 to 1934. From 1934 to 1946, she compiled an annual list of books and articles on British economic history for the journal. Among her scholarly publications were The Cotton Trade and Industrial Lancashire, 1600–1780 (1931, with Alfred P. Wadsworth), and The Cloth Industry in the West of England from 1640 to 1880 (1971).

In retirement, Mann lived at Melksham, Wiltshire, and continued her historical research and writing. She served as president of the West Wiltshire Historical Society. An edited collection of textile histories was published in her honour in 1973.

Brian Harrison recorded an oral history interview with Mann, in May 1976, as part of the Suffrage Interviews project, titled Oral evidence on the suffragette and suffragist movements: the Brian Harrison interviews. The interview uses the name Miss J de L Mann. She talks about her time at Oxford, her subsequent career, and how she got to know Kathleen Courtney – whom she describes as her second cousin – and the Courtney family.

Julia de Lacy Mann died in 1985, aged 93, in Melksham.
