= Winifred Moberly =

British academic administrator

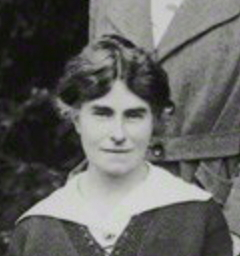
- Winifred Moberly in 1909

Principal of St Hilda's College, Oxford
- In office 1919–1928
- Preceded by: Christine Burrows
- Succeeded by: Julia de Lacy Mann

Personal details
- Born: Winifred Horsbrugh Moberly; 1 April 1875
- Died: 6 April 1928 (aged 53)
- Education: Winchester High School; Sydenham High School
- Alma mater: Lady Margaret Hall, Oxford

Winifred Horsbrugh Moberly (1 April 1875 – 6 April 1928) was a British academic administrator, the principal of St Hilda's College, Oxford, from 1919 to 1928.

== Early life and education ==
She was born in Calcutta, British India on 1 April 1875, the ninth child and fourth daughter of Charles Morris Moberly (1837–1897), an officer in the Madras Staff Corps, and his wife, Eliza Augusta Dorward (1841–1909), the daughter of James Dorward of Trichinopoly. Her elder sister Ethel Charlotte Moberly was married to the Russian-born British novelist Fred Whishaw, and Winifred visited them in St Petersburg in her younger years.

Moberly was educated at Winchester High School and Sydenham High School. She was the first pupil from Sydenham High School to win the Unuversity Scholarship in 1894, which enabled her to attend Lady Margaret Hall, Oxford. She achieved Second-class in Classical Moderations at Oxford but left the university in 1897 before completing the full course.

== Career ==
=== Early career and World War I ===
From 1910 to 1912, Moberly was Bursar of Lady Margaret Hall, her alma mater. From 1914 to 1915, Moberly was honorary secretary of the Home Help Society. This was set up by the Central Committee on Women's Employment to train unskilled, middle-aged, working-class women to carry out domestic duties for poor households where the mother was incapable due to, for example, illness. At the end of 1915 she went out to Petrograd, Russia where, in the administrator role, she helped set up a Millicent Fawcett Hospital unit: a maternity unit for the relief of Polish refugees. She remained in this role until early 1917.

In October 1917 she was appointed area secretary of the Young Women's Christian Association in Calais. There she helped set up recreation huts and canteens for the Women's Army Auxiliary Corps. She held this role until July 1918 and was awarded the British War Medal for this work.

=== Return to Oxford ===
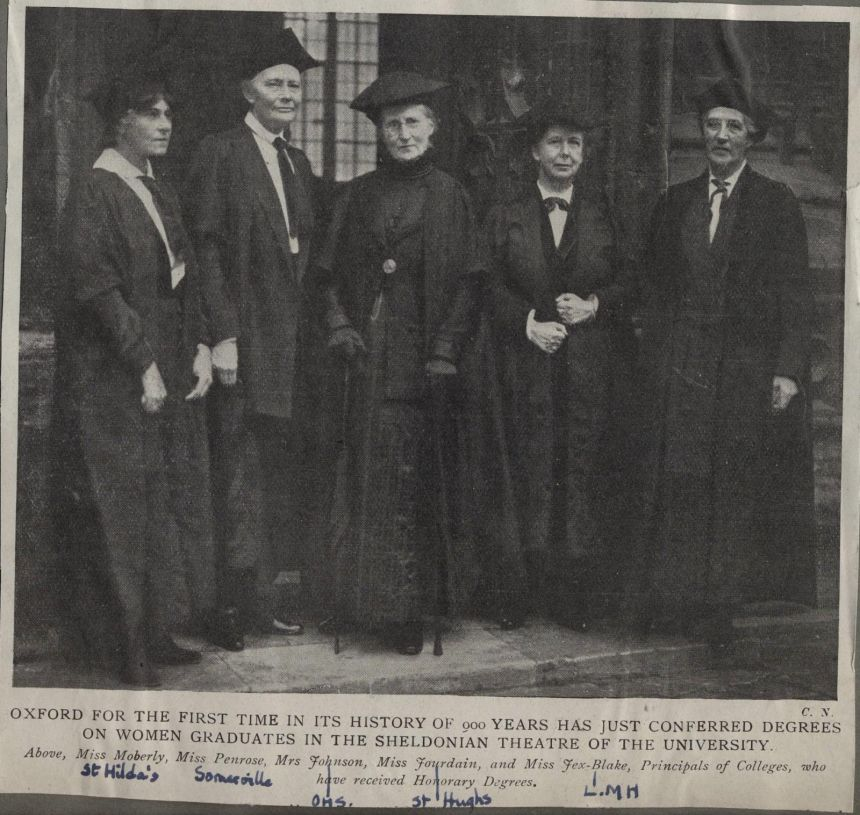
Oxford women principals who received their honorary MA in 1920. L.-R.: Winifred Moberly, Emily Penrose, Bertha Johnson, Eleanor Jourdain, and Henrietta Jex-Blake

Moberly was appointed as principal of St Hilda's College, Oxford in 1919. The following year marked the first time that the university awarded degrees to women and Moberly was, along with other women tutors and principals at Oxford, awarded an honorary MA by Decree of Convocation.

== Death and legacy ==
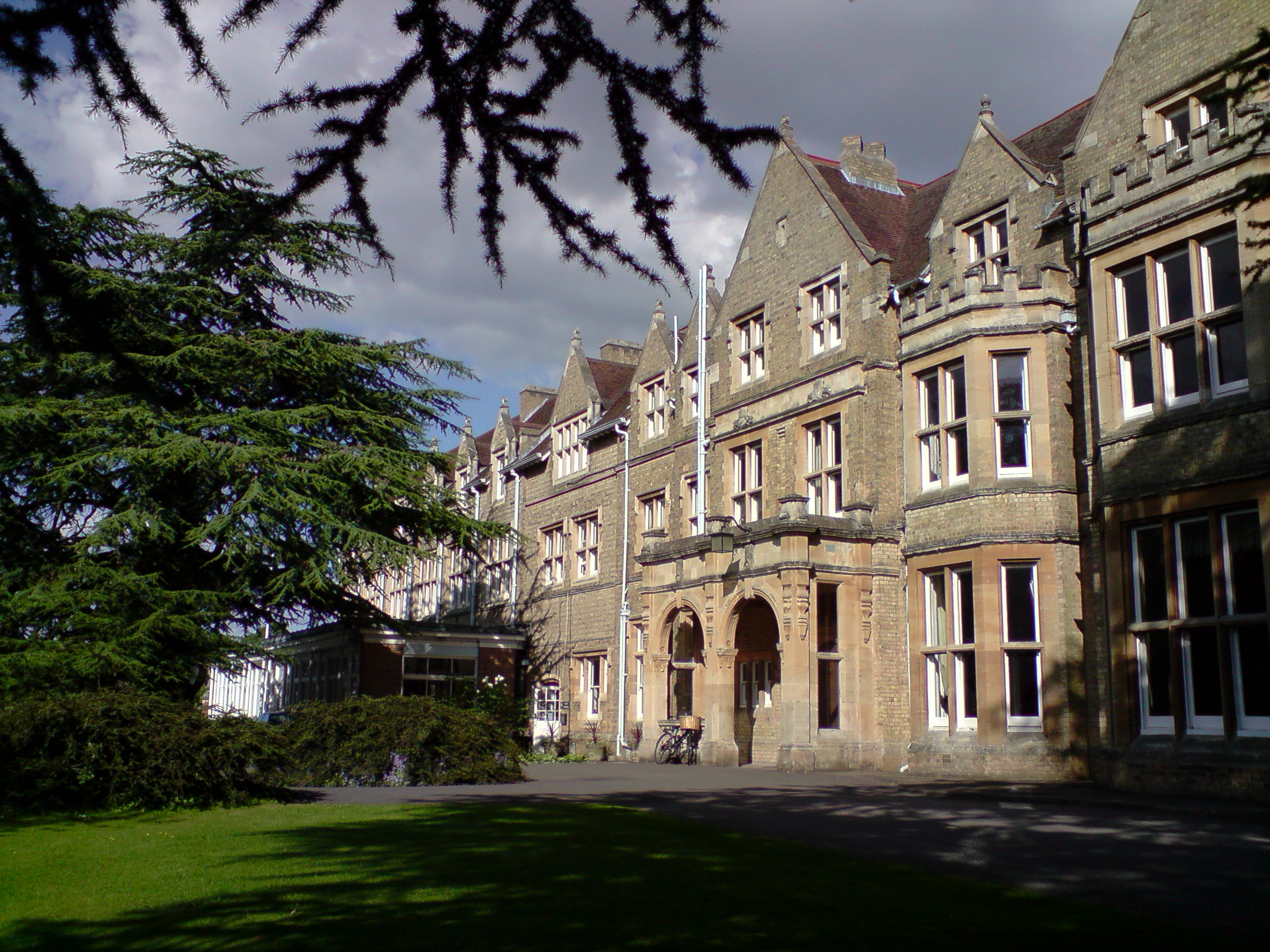
South Building, St Hilda's College, Oxford

She died of heart failure at Laverstock, Wiltshire on 6 April 1928. She had struggled with persistent insomnia before her death.

St Hilda's College named a room in its South Building after Moberly.
