= List of people associated with St Anne's College, Oxford =

The following is a list of notable people associated with St Anne's College, Oxford, including alumnae, academics, and principals of the college.

As a former women's college, St Anne's continues to refer to former students, male or female, as "alumnae".

The list includes people associated with the Society of Oxford Home-Students and St Anne's Society prior to the official founding of the College.

== Alumnae ==
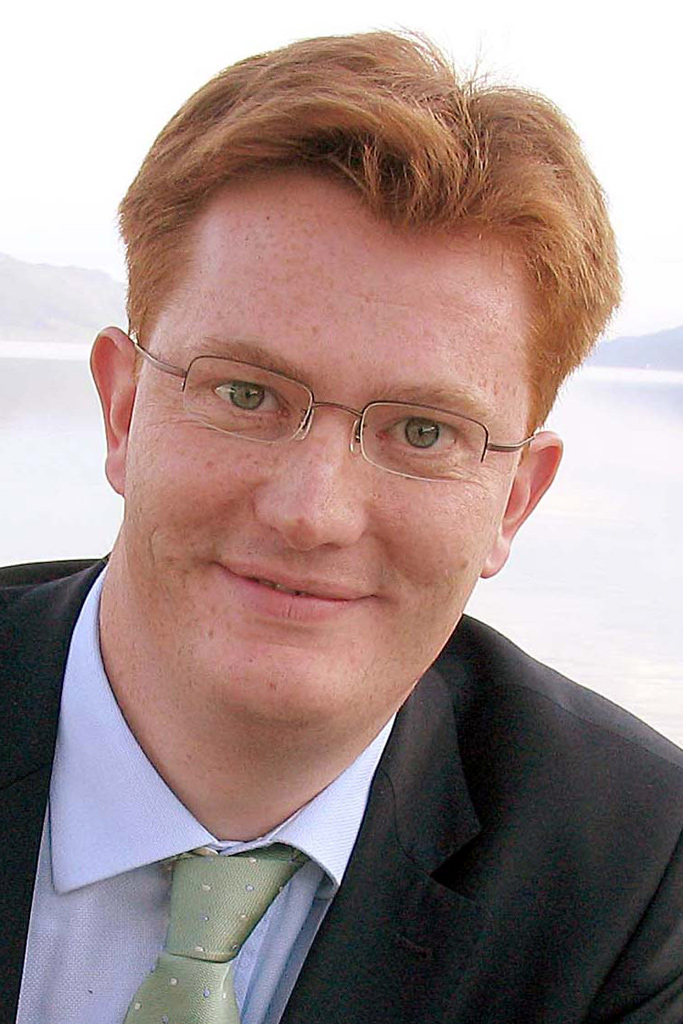
Danny Alexander, former Chief Secretary to the Treasury

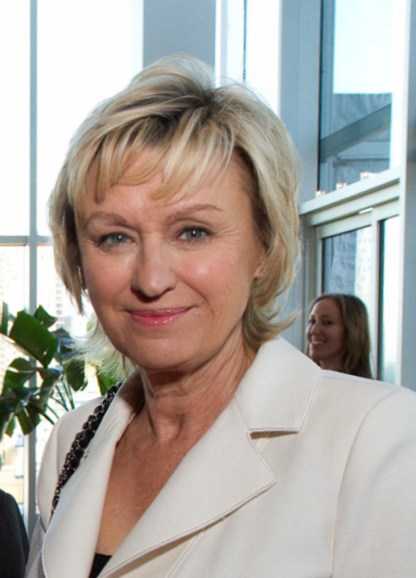
Tina Brown, editor of The Daily Beast and ex-editor of Vanity Fair and The New Yorker

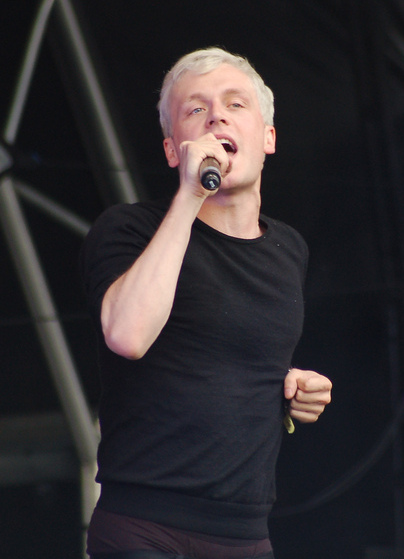
Mr Hudson, rapper and R&B artist

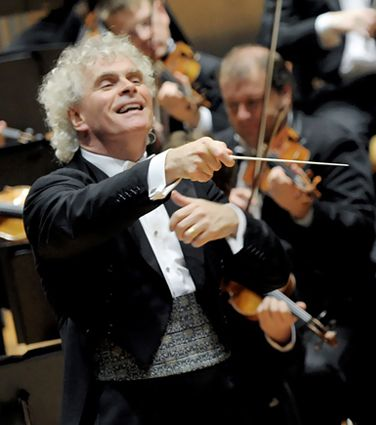
Sir Simon Rattle, principal conductor of the Berlin Philharmonic

- Danny Alexander (born 1972) – Knighted Liberal Democrat MP for Inverness, Nairn, Badenoch & Strathspey, Chief Secretary to the Treasury
- Mary Applebey (1916–2012) – mental health campaigner and co-founder of MIND
- Mary Archer (born 1944) – baroness and scientist specialising in solar power conversion
- Karen Armstrong (born 1944) – FRSL – author on comparative religion
- Jackie Ashley (born 1954) – broadcaster, journalist and contributor to The Guardian and New Statesman
- Wendy Beckett (1930–2018) – BBC art historian
- Dame Gillian Beer (born 1935) – literary critic and former President of Clare Hall, Cambridge (1994–2001)
- Nicola Blackwood (born 1979) – Conservative MP for Oxford West and Abingdon (2010–17)
- Mark Bostridge (born 1961) – writer and critic, biographer of Vera Brittain and Florence Nightingale
- Tina Brown (born 1953), CBE – writer, and magazine editor of The Daily Beast, Vanity Fair and The New Yorker
- C. Violet Butler (1884–1982) – Social researcher and educator active in Oxford
- Frances Cairncross (born 1944), DBE, CBE – journalist, economist, and Rector of Exeter College, Oxford (2004–2014)
- Olive Clapham (1898–1973) – first woman to pass the bar finals examinations in England and Wales
- Rosemary Cramp (1929–2023) – archaeologist specialising in Anglo-Saxon literature and culture
- Edwina Currie (born 1946) – Conservative MP and minister (1983–1997)
- Liam D'Arcy-Brown (born 1970) – Sinologist and travel writer
- Ruth Deech (born 1943) – baroness, DBE – lawyer, bioethicist, and former Principal of St Anne's (1991–2004)
- Paul Donovan (born 1972) – economist and author
- Mary Douglas (1921–2007) – dame, DBE, FBA, anthropologist
- Anne Dreydel (1918–2007) – OBE, co-founder of Oxford English Centre, now St Clare's International School
- Rose Dugdale (1941-2024) – debutante, then IRA member and art thief
- Moira Dunbar (1918–1999) – Arctic ice researcher
- U. A. Fanthorpe (1929–2009), CBE, FRSL – poet
- Penelope Farmer (born 1939) – children's writer
- Helen Fielding (born 1958) – novelist known for the Bridget Jones series
- Helen Fraser (born 1949) – executive and publisher
- Hadley Freeman (born 1978) – writer and columnist for The Guardian and Vogue
- Urszula Gacek (born 1963) – Polish politician, since 2011 Poland's Ambassador to The Council of Europe
- Helen Palmer Geisel (1898–1967) – children's book author and co-founder of Beginner Books
- Sanjay Ghose (1959–1997) – Indian rural development activist.
- Jean Golding (born 1939) – epidemiologist
- Sarah Gristwood (living) – journalist and author
- Miriam Gross (living) – literary editor and co-founder of Standpoint magazine
- Mary Harron (born 1953) – Canadian director/screenwriter, best known for American Psycho
- Zoë Heller (born 1965) – journalist and novelist known for Notes on a Scandal
- Miriam Hodgson (1938–2005) – editor of children's books
- Brad Hooker (born 1957) – philosopher specialising in ethics, Professor of Philosophy at Reading University
- Nancy Hubbard (born 1963) – professor and Miriam Katowitz Chair of Management and Accounting at Goucher College, Baltimore
- Mr Hudson (Ben Hudson) (born 1979) – pop musician
- Devaki Jain (born 1933) – Indian economist, writer and feminist
- Diana Wynne Jones (1934–2011) – fantasy novelist known for Chrestomanci series and Howl's Moving Castle
- Martha Kearney (born 1957) – broadcaster and journalist with BBC Radio 4
- Sally Laird (born 1956) – writer, editor and translator
- Sandra Landy (1938–2017) – world champion bridge player and computer scientist
- Penelope Lively (born 1933) – CBE, FRSL, novelist and Booker Prize winner for Moon Tiger
- Guy Lynn (living) – investigative reporter for the BBC
- William MacAskill (born 1987) – philosopher, co-founder of Effective Altruism movement
- Mercia MacDermott (born 1927) – writer and historian
- Kevin Macdonald – film director, The Last King of Scotland and State of Play
- Sara Maitland (born 1950) – fiction writer
- Max More (born 1964) – philosopher and futurist, founder of Extropy Institute
- Rebecca Morelle (living) – journalist, global science correspondent for BBC News
- Sizwe Mpofu-Walsh (born 1989) – South African author, musician and activist
- Lindsay Northover (born 1954) – baroness, Liberal Democrat member of House of Lords since 2000
- Una O'Brien (living), Permanent Secretary Department of Health
- Nuala O'Faolain (1940–2008) – writer, broadcaster and feminist
- Samir Okasha (born 1971) – philosopher, Professor of Philosophy of Science, University of Bristol
- Nicola Padfield (born 1955) – Master of Fitzwilliam College, Cambridge, Professor of Criminal and Penal Justice at Law Faculty, University of Cambridge
- Ruma Pal (born 1941) – justice of the Supreme Court of India
- Adam Parsons (born 1970) – television and radio presenter
- Amanda Pritchard (1994-1997) - First female CEO of NHS England, took office in 2021 and joined Boris Johnson in calling for volunteers during the Covid-19 Pandemic.
- Ged Quinn (born 1963) – artist and musician
- Norah Lillian Penston (1903–1974) – Principal of Bedford College, University of London
- Melanie Phillips (born 1951) – journalist and author, winner of Orwell Prize
- Libby Purves (born 1950) – OBE, radio presenter and drama critic for The Times
- Janina Ramirez (born 1980) – art historian, lecturer and TV presenter
- Simon Rattle (born 1955) – CBE, FRSA, orchestral conductor for Berlin Philharmonic and London Symphony Orchestra
- Mary Remnant (1935–2020) – medieval musicologist and musician
- Gillian Reynolds (born 1935) – MBE, journalist and broadcaster
- John Robins (born 1982) – stand-up comedian and radio presenter
- Jancis Robinson (born 1950) – OBE, wine critic and author
- James Rutledge (living) – musician and producer
- Cicely Saunders (1918–2005) – dame, OM, social worker, physician, writer and pioneer of hospice movement
- Frances Stonor Saunders (born 1966) – journalist, film-maker and associate editor of New Statesman
- Samantha Shannon (born 1991) – author of The Bone Season dystopian fiction series
- Susan Sontag (1933–2004) – US writer, literary theorist and political activist
- Susan J. Smith (born 1956) – Mistress of Girton College, Cambridge, Honorary Professor, Department of Geography, University of Cambridge
- Harriet Spicer (born 1950) – publisher
- Russell Taylor (born 1960) – MBE, journalist and composer
- Jane Thynne (born 1961) – novelist, journalist and broadcaster
- Polly Toynbee (born 1946) – journalist with The Guardian, writer and broadcaster
- Victor Ubogu (born 1964) – Rugby player for Bath Rugby, businessman
- Jenny Uglow (born 1947) – OBE, critic and noted biographer, editorial director of Chatto and Windus
- Hilary Wainwright (born 1949) – feminist
- Jill Paton Walsh (1937–2020) – CBE, novelist and children's writer
- Victoria Whitworth (born 1966) – Anglo-Scots novelist, archaeologist and art historian
- Ivy Williams (1877–1966) – first woman called to the English bar
- Mara Yamauchi (born 1973) – long-distance track and marathon runner
- Janet Young (1926–2002) – baroness, Conservative politician, first female Leader of the House of Lords

== Academics ==
- Peter Ady – Fellow (1947–2004), eminent development economist, adviser to the Burmese Government and Ministry of Overseas Development.
- Roger Crisp – current Professor of Moral Philosophy, Uehiro Fellow and Tutor in Philosophy, Chairman of Management Committee of the Oxford Uehiro Centre for Practical Ethics
- Peter Donnelly, FRS – current Fellow (1996–), Australian mathematician and statistician, and current director of the Wellcome Trust Centre for Human Genetics at Oxford University
- Bent Flyvbjerg – current Fellow, noted economic geographer, urban planner, and current director of the BT Centre for Major Programme Management at the Saïd Business School
- Jenifer Hart – History Fellow
- Margaret Hubbard – Australian classical scholar specializing in philology; one of St Anne's 15 founding fellows
- Jonathan Katz – stipendiary lecturer, and current University Public Orator
- Patrick McGuinness – current Professor of French and Comparative Literature, Fellow and Tutor in French, author, and poet
- Georg Gottlob, FRS – current Fellow (since 2006), noted Austrian computer scientist specialising in database theory, logic, and artificial intelligence
- A. C. Grayling, FRSA, FRSL – current Supernumerary Fellow, philosopher, author, human rights and civil liberties advocate
- Tony Judt, FBA – Fellow (1980–87), author, historian, and public intellectual, later the director of the Erich Maria Remarque Institute at NYU and contributor to the New York Review of Books
- John Lloyd – current Supernumerary Fellow, journalist, contributor to the Financial Times, and co-founder of the Reuters Institute for the Study of Journalism at Oxford University
- Nick Middleton – current Supernumerary Fellow, physical geographer specialising in desertification, and consultant to the IUCN, UNEP, EU, and WWF.
- Iris Murdoch, DBE – Fellow (1948–99), philosopher, and novelist, known for Under the Net and The Sea, The Sea
- Graham Nelson – current Supernumerary Fellow (since 2007), mathematician, poet, and noted interactive fiction game designer
- Roger Reed – current Supernumerary Fellow, professor of engineering and material science.
- Stephen Alexander Smith – Fellow (1991–98), legal scholar and writer
- Gabriele Taylor – current senior research fellow, philosopher in ethics

== Principals ==
A list of principals of St Anne's College, Oxford.

- 1894–1921 Bertha Johnson
- 1921–1929 Christine Burrows
- 1929–1940 Grace Eleanor Hadow
- 1940–1953 Eleanor Plumer
- 1953–1966 Mary Ogilvie
- 1966–1984 Nancy Trenaman
- 1984–1991 Claire Palley
- 1991–2004 Ruth Deech
- 2004–2016 Tim Gardam
- 2016–2017 Robert Chard (acting)
- 2017–present: Helen King
