= Deneke =

Deneke is a surname. Notable people with the surname include:

- Helena Deneke (1878–1973), British Germanist at Oxford University
- Margaret Deneke (1882–1969), British pianist and musicologist, sister of Helena
- Marlies Deneke (born 1953), German politician
- Volrad Deneke (1920–2006), German politician

== See also ==
- Death of Brian Deneke
