= Oxford Women Students' Society for Women's Suffrage =

Student society in Oxford, England

- Abbreviation: OWSSWS
- Predecessor: Suffrage societies at the women's colleges in Oxford
- Formation: 1911
- Founder: Grace Hadow
- Founded at: Oxford, England
- Merger of: Oxford college women's suffrage societies
- Type: Nonprofit
- Purpose: Women's suffrage
- Location: Oxford, United Kingdom
- Region served: Oxford
- Official language: English
- President: Grace Hadow
- Secretary: Helena Deneke
- Key people: Grace Hadow, Helena Deneke
- Parent organization: University of Oxford
- Affiliations: National Union of Women's Suffrage Societies

The Oxford Women Students' Society for Women's Suffrage (OWSSWS) was a student society concerned with women's suffrage in Oxford, England.

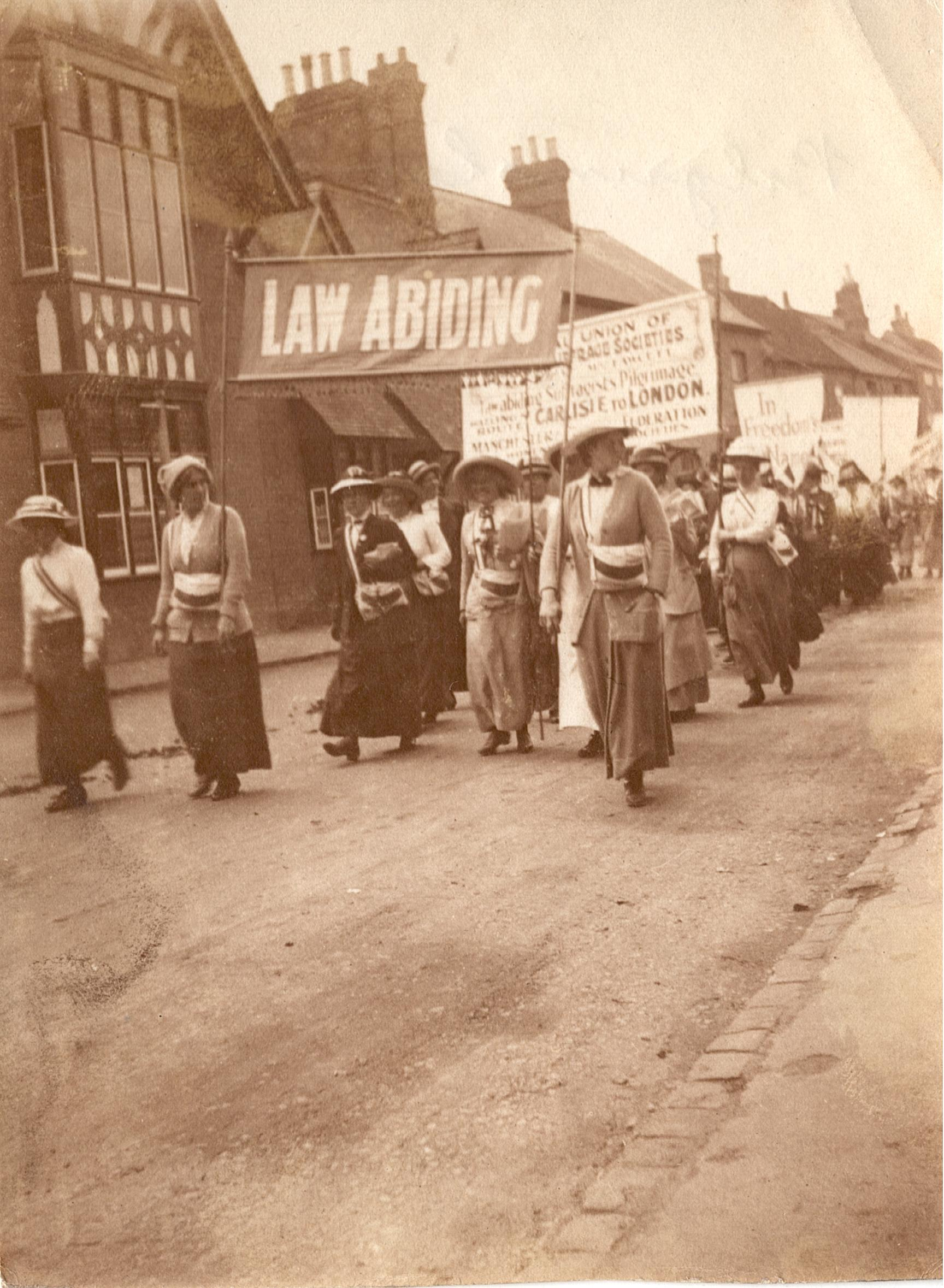
Women's suffrage pilgrims leaving Thame, Oxfordshire, during the Great Pilgrimage of 1913, in which the OWSSWS participated

In 1911, the suffrage societies at the women's Oxford colleges combined to form the OWSSWS. As for the Oxford Society for Women's Suffrage, they were also allied with the National Union of Women's Suffrage Societies (NUWSS). The society membership included current and former University of Oxford students who participated in demonstrations and processions in London, often carrying a banner that as designed by Edmund New. (A 2018 recreation of this suffrage banner hangs in the foyer of St Hugh's College, Oxford.) All the women's college suffrage societies contributed to the cost of the banner, and some individual women including Annie Rogers and Helena Deneke also made individual contributions. The OWSSWS banner was carried for the first time in the Women's Coronation Procession of 7 June 1911 in London and later during the Great Pilgrimage of 1913, a national suffrage march that lasted six weeks and ended with a rally in Hyde Park, London. Participants marched through the city of Oxford in July 1913 and were joined in Summertown (a North Oxford suburb) by further local suffragists.

The society was first established with Grace Hadow (1875–1940), who had been an English student at Somerville College, Oxford, as president. Helena Deneke (1878–1972), a Germanist, served as OWSSWS secretary during 1914–15. Deneke and Hadow both joined the 1913 Great Pilgrimage for women's suffrage.

The society's archive is held by the Women's Library at the London School of Economics.
