= Andrew Cain =

Andrew Cain may refer to:

- Andrew Cain (General Hospital), a character on the soap opera General Hospital
- Andrew Cain (boxer), English boxer
- Andrew Foreshew-Cain, né Andrew Cain, Church of England priest
