= OLMS =

OLMS may stand for:

- Office of Labor-Management Standards, an agency of the U.S. Department of Labor
- Oxford Ladies' Music Society, a former music society in Oxford, England
