= OCMS =

OCMS may refer to:

- Oxford Centre for Mission Studies, a mission in Oxford, England
- Oxford Chamber Music Society, a music society in Oxford, England
- Old Crow Medicine Show, a folk/country musical group from Nashville, Tennessee
  - O.C.M.S., Old Crow Medicine Show's debut album
