= Holywell Music Room =

Chamber music hall in Oxford, England

Coordinates: 51.7552°N 1.2532°W

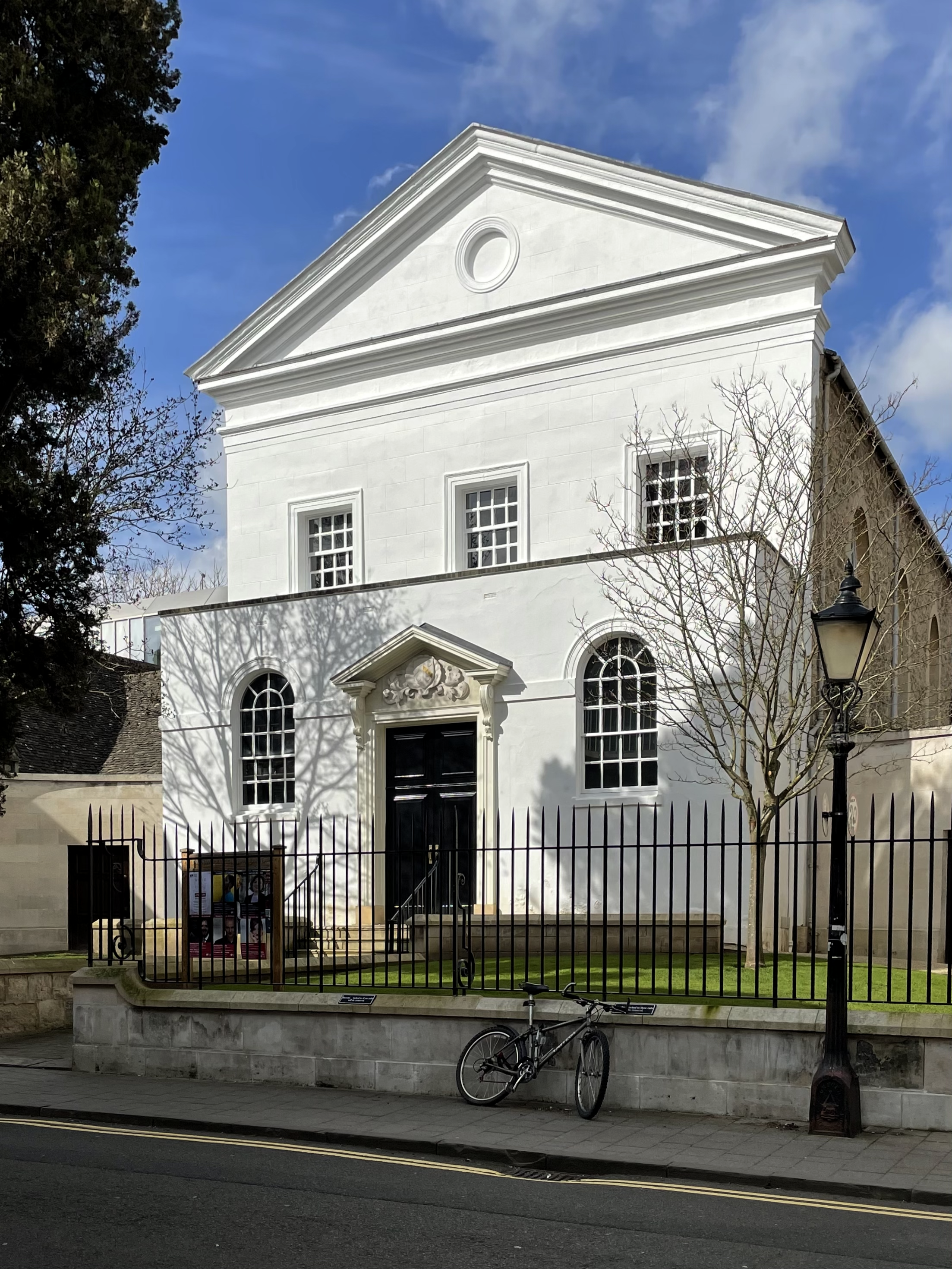
- Holywell Music Room in 2021

General information
- Location: Oxford, England
- Owner: Wadham College, Oxford

Technical details
- Material: Wood and stone

Location of The Holywell Music Room within central Oxford

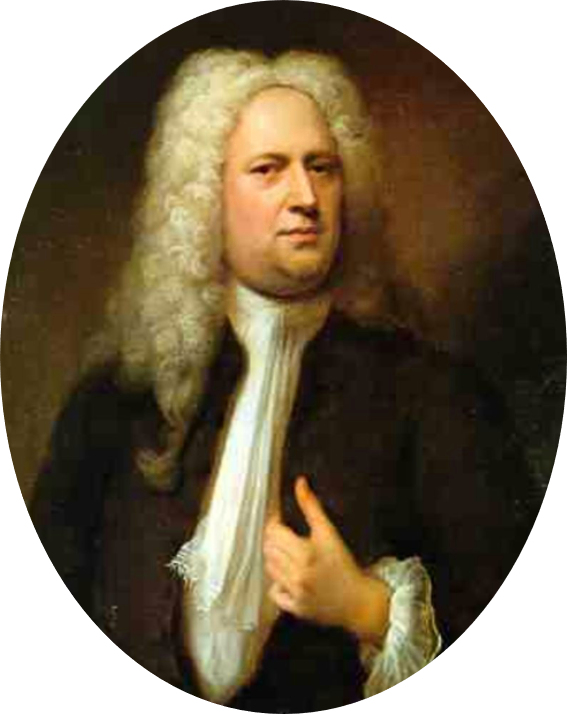
George Frideric Handel (1685–1759), who performed in the Holywell Music Room

The Holywell Music Room is the city of Oxford's chamber music hall, situated on Holywell Street in the city centre, and is part of Wadham College. Built in 1748, it is said to be the oldest purpose-built music room in Europe, and hence Britain's first concert hall.

== History ==
The Holywell Music Room, which is part of Wadham College, Oxford, was one of the earliest purpose built concert venues in the world and the first in Europe. Prior to the advent of concert halls, recitals would happen at private aristocratic venues, royal courts, or in churches. It was built in 1748, probably under the direction of William Hayes and it was designed by Dr Thomas Camplin, the vice-principal of St Edmund Hall. The venue was important for popularizing the music of Haydn in 18th century England. He was the most frequently performed composer during 1788–1791; at short notice he was unable to attend a planned visit to the venue while in Oxford in 1791.

By 1836, the building was being used for purposes beyond concerts, including auctions and exhibitions. During the 1870s, the Oxford Philharmonic Society would give weekly concerts. In 1910, the building was leased by the Oxford University Musical Union, and John Henry Mee wrote his essay The Oldest Music Room in Europe the following year. The building was Grade II* listed in 1954, and in 1959 it was restored.

== Building ==
The building cost £1,263 and 10s, equivalent to approximately £2.5 million in 2018, (Note: Comparing labour costs between 1748 and 2018, £1,263 and 10s is valued at approximately £2,425,000.00 by MeasuringWorth.com) and included chandeliers that had previously been hung in Westminster Hall for the Coronation of George IV and were subsequently donated to Wadham College. The building was funded by public subscription. The auditorium seats 200, includes an organ, which likely dates from the 1800s and originated in Holland. The room is the venue for a wide variety of music performances.

== Gallery ==
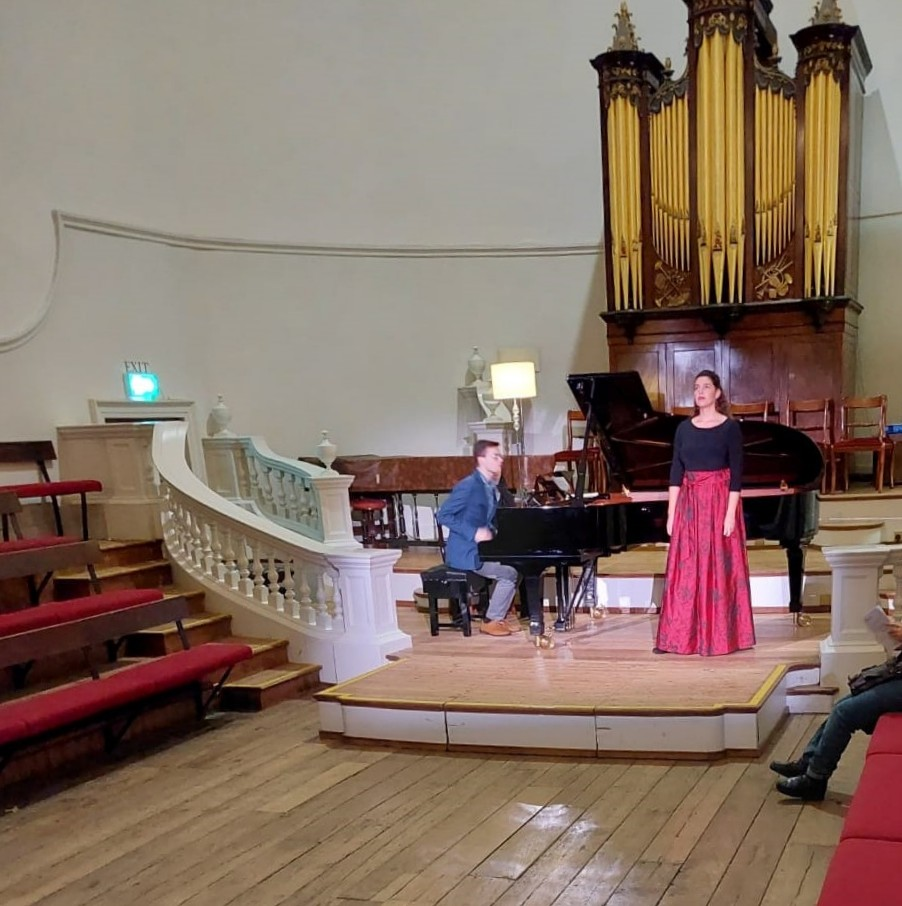
A singer and her accompanist competing in the final round of Bampton Classical Opera's Young Singers' Competition in December 2021 in the Holywell Music Room

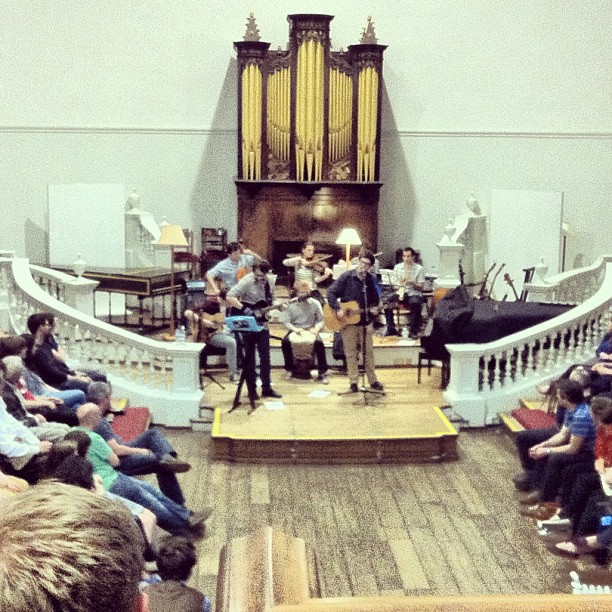
A youth band playing in the Room

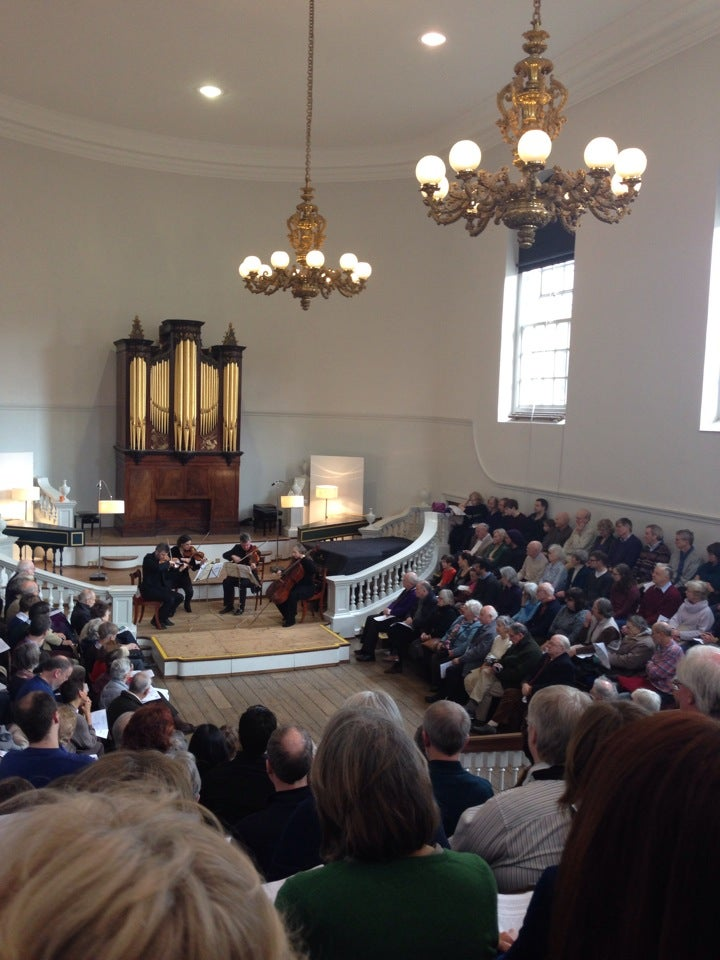
A string quartet playing chamber music in the Room

== See also ==
- Sheldonian Theatre
- Jacqueline Du Pré Music Building
- Bodleian Library
- Oxford Chamber Music Society
