= Wolvercote Cemetery =

Cemetery in Oxford, England

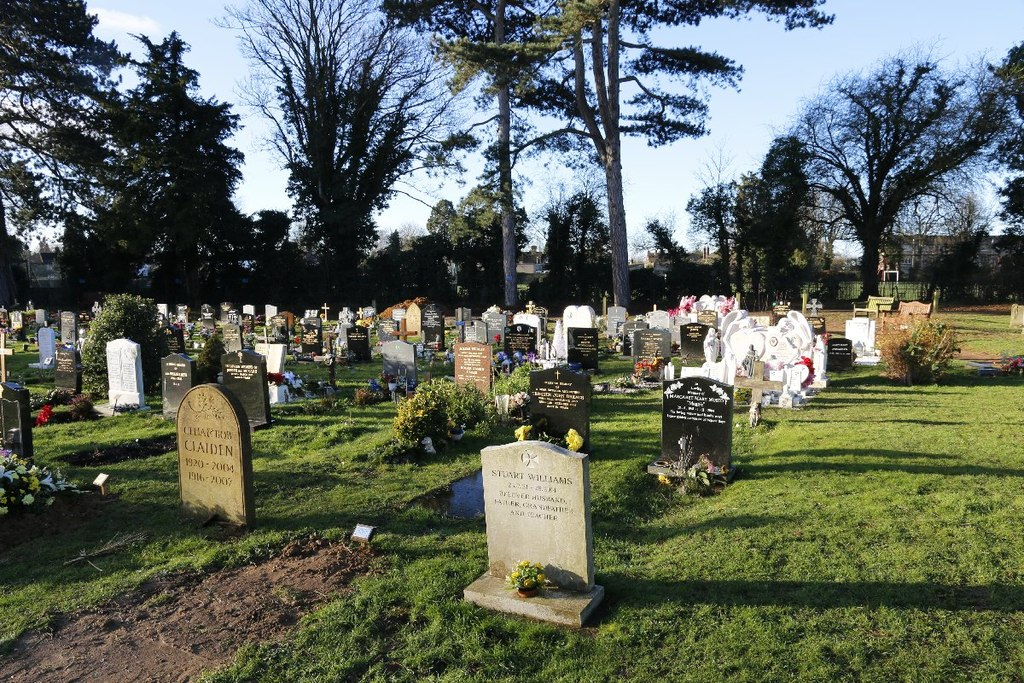
- Headstones in Wolvercote Cemetery
- Interactive map of Wolvercote Cemetery

Details
- Established: 1889
- Location: Cutteslowe, Oxford
- Country: United Kingdom
- Coordinates: 51.791°N 1.273°W
- Type: Public
- No. of graves: c.15,000
- Website: oxford.gov.uk

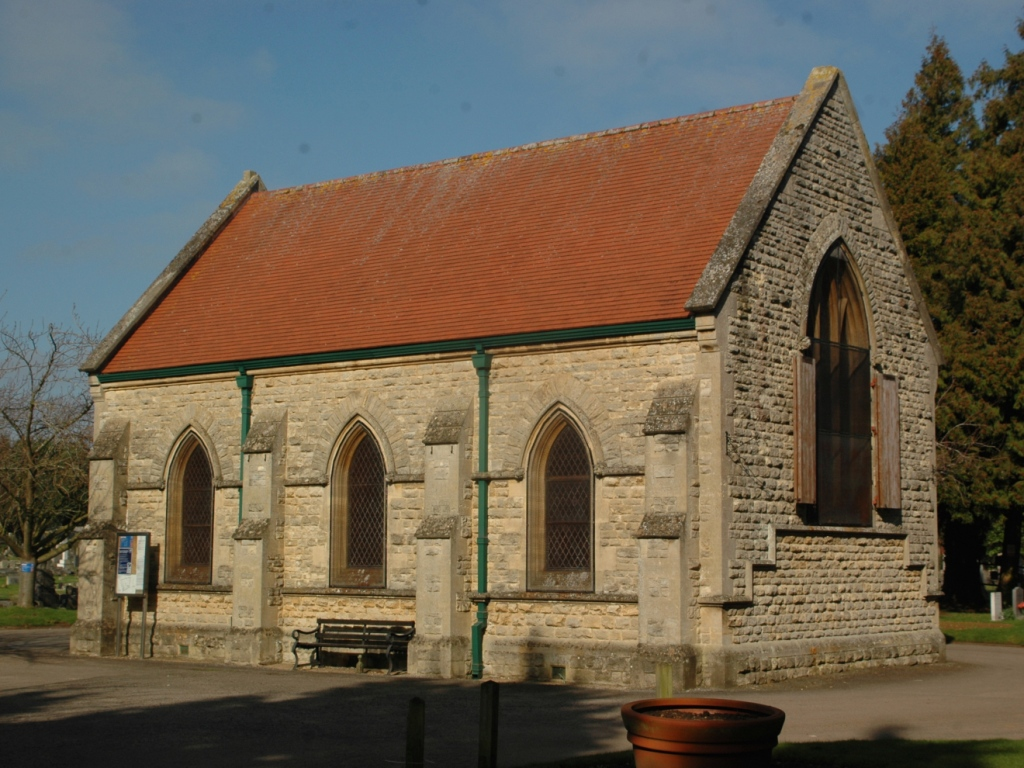
Wolvercote Cemetery chapel

Wolvercote Cemetery is a cemetery in the parish of Wolvercote and district of Cutteslowe in Oxford, England. Its main entrance is on Banbury Road, and it has a side entrance (usually closed) in Five Mile Drive. It has a funeral chapel, public toilets, and a small amount of car parking. It was awarded plaques as a category winner of 'Cemetery of the Year' in 1999 and 2001.

The cemetery was opened in 1889 and now contains more than 15,000 burials. Along with the other Oxford public cemeteries, it was expected to be full before 2021.

== Sections ==
The cemetery has a number of sections for individual religions or ethnicities, including Baháʼí, Muslim, Jewish (first section dedicated 1894; extension 2000), Greek Orthodox, Russian Orthodox, Serbian Orthodox, Polish Roman Catholic, other Roman Catholic (the section in which the Tolkiens are buried) and Quakers.

There is an area for the burial of cremated remains, one for green burials, and another for the burial of stillborns and infants.

== Notable interments ==
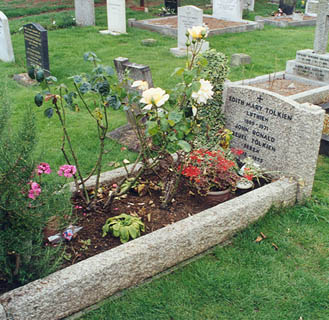
Grave of J. R. R. and Edith Tolkien

Many notable people are buried in Wolvercote Cemetery, including many former academics of the University of Oxford.

- Charles Umpherston Aitchison (1832–1896), Lieutenant Governor of the Punjab
- Michael Argyle (1925–2002), social psychologist, and his wife, Sonia
- Sir Roger Bannister (1929–2018), middle-distance runner and neurologist who ran the first sub-4-minute mile
- Sir Ernest Bennett (1865–1947), Oxford fellow, politician, explorer, and writer
- Sir Isaiah Berlin (1909–1997), Latvian-born philosopher, and his wife Aline
- Benjamin Henry Blackwell (1849–1924), bookseller
- E. J. Bowen (1898–1980), chemist
- Włodzimierz Brus (1921–2007), economist, with his wife, Lieutenant-Colonel Helena Wolińska-Brus (1919–2008), communist military prosecutor.
- John Burdon-Sanderson (1828–1905), physiologist
- Edwin Cannan (1861–1935), economist
- Humphrey Carpenter (1946–2005), biographer and writer
- Jaroslav Černý (1898–1970), Czech Egyptologist
- Sir Thomas Chapman, 7th Baronet (1846–1919) and Sarah Junner (1861–1959), with inscriptions to the memory of their sons Frank, Will and T. E. Lawrence
- Robert Bellamy Clifton (1836–1921), physicist
- L. Jonathan Cohen (1923–2006), philosopher
- Frank Cooper (1844–1927) and his wife Sarah Cooper (1848–1932), marmalade manufacturers
- T. Lawrence Dale (1884–1959), architect and Oxford Diocesan Surveyor
- Helena Deneke (1878–1973), Germanist, librarian, and bursar
- Margaret Deneke (1882–1969), pianist, musicologist, choirmaster, and benefactor (sister of Helena)
- John Louis Emil Dreyer (1852–1926), Danish-born astronomer
- Edward Gordon Duff (1861–1924), bibliographer
- Sir Michael Dummett (1925–2011), philosopher
- Elizabeth Edmondson (1948–2016), author
- Bill Ferrar (1893–1990), mathematician
- Grace Eleanor Hadow (1875–1940), promoter of women's higher education
- H. L. A. Hart (1907–1992), legal philosopher and professor of jurisprudence, with his wife Jenifer Hart (1914–2005), historian
- Sir Thomas Erskine Holland (1835–1926), professor of international law
- Walter Hooper (1931–2020), secretary to C. S. Lewis and Lewis's literary executor, in which role he wrote Lewis's authorized biography and edited his 3-volume collection of letters as well as many other posthumously published works by Lewis
- Albert Hourani (1915–1993), scholar of Middle Eastern history
- Elizabeth Jennings (1926–2001), poet
- Sir Francis Knowles, 5th Baronet (1886–1953), anthropologist
- Adam Koc (1891–1969), politician, colonel, and journalist of the Second Polish Republic
- Peter Laslett (1915–2001), social historian
- James Legge (1815–1897), Scottish sinologist and first Professor of Chinese at the University of Oxford
- Eleanor Constance Lodge (1869–1936), historian and promoter of women's higher education
- Paul Maas (1880–1964), Classical and Byzantine scholar
- Michael Francis Madelin (1931–2007), mycologist
- James McCann (1897–1983), Archbishop of Armagh and Primate of All Ireland
- Sir Henry Christopher Mance (1840–1926), electrical engineer, developer of the heliograph
- Bruce Mitchell (1920–2010), Australian scholar of Old English
- James Murray (1837–1915), Scottish lexicographer and philologist, primary editor of the Oxford English Dictionary
- Dimitri Obolensky (1918–2001), Russian prince and professor of Russian and Balkan history
- Daphne Park (1921–2010), spy
- William Henry Perkin Jr. (1860–1929), organic chemist
- Sir William Schlich (1840–1925), forester
- James Allen Shuffrey (1858–1939), Victorian and Edwardian watercolour artist
- Franz Baermann Steiner (1909–1952), ethnologist
- Sir P. F. Strawson (1919–2006), philosopher
- J. R. R. Tolkien ("Beren", 1892–1973), author and academic, with his wife Edith ("Lúthien", 1889–1971) and eldest son John Francis Reuel Tolkien (1917–2003)
- Dino Toso (1969–2008), automotive engineer
- Brian Tovey (1926–2015), head of GCHQ
- Francis Fortescue Urquhart (1868–1934), first Roman Catholic fellow of Balliol College in modern times
- Kallistos (Timothy) Ware (1934-2022), Metropolitan of Diokleia, Orthodox bishop, theologian and academic
- Mike Woodin (1965–2004), Green Party politician
- E. M. Wright (1906–2005), mathematician

== War graves ==
The cemetery includes the war graves of 44 Commonwealth service personnel: 21 from World War I and 23 from World War II.

== See also ==
- Holywell Cemetery
- Osney Cemetery
- Rose Hill Cemetery, Oxford
- St Sepulchre's Cemetery
