= Oxford Society for Women's Suffrage =

Society in Oxford, England

- Abbreviation: OSWS
- Named after: Oxford
- Formation: 1904
- Founded at: Oxford, England
- Type: Nonprofit
- Purpose: Women's suffrage
- Headquarters: Holywell Street, Oxford
- Location: Oxford, United Kingdom
- Origins: University of Oxford
- Region served: Oxford
- Services: Shop and library
- Official language: English
- Key people: John Rhys, Winifred & Francis Haverfield, Jessie & David Margoliouth
- Affiliations: National Union of Women's Suffrage Societies

The Oxford Society for Women's Suffrage (OSWS) was a society concerned with women's suffrage in Oxford, England, and associated with the University of Oxford.

The society was founded in 1904 and its first meeting held at Somerville College. Its membership was open to men and women. The OWSS was affiliated with the National Union of Women’s Suffrage Societies (NUWSS), like the later Oxford Women Students' Society for Women's Suffrage founded in 1911. One of their speakers was Millicent Fawcett, the president of the NUWSS. Their activism included "at homes", public meetings, and writing for the local and national press.

OSWS meetings were held at several locations including Somerville College, St Hilda's College, St Hugh's College, Manchester College, and public spaces such as Oxford Town Hall. Suffrage families and individuals who held meetings and events in their own houses included the Rhys family, in particular John Rhŷs home in Jesus College, the Winshields in Headington, the St Hugh's College mathematics tutor Winifred Haverfield and her husband Francis (the Camden Professor of Ancient History), and Jessie Margoliouth and her husband, David (the Laudian Professor of Arabic), at 88 Woodstock Road in North Oxford.

In 1910 the society joined the newly created Oxon, Berks and Bucks Federation of the NUWSS. From 1911, the society had an office in Holywell Street, central Oxford. The office, which contained a library and a shop, was also used for meetings. which served as a venue for meetings as well as a suffrage shop and library. In 1913, it was raided by a male undergraduate. Vera Brittain arrived at Somerville College in 1914 as a student and joined the OSWS.

The society produced an Annual Report on its activities.

== See also ==
- Oxford Women Students' Society for Women's Suffrage
