= Oxford Chamber Music Society =

Music society in Oxford, England

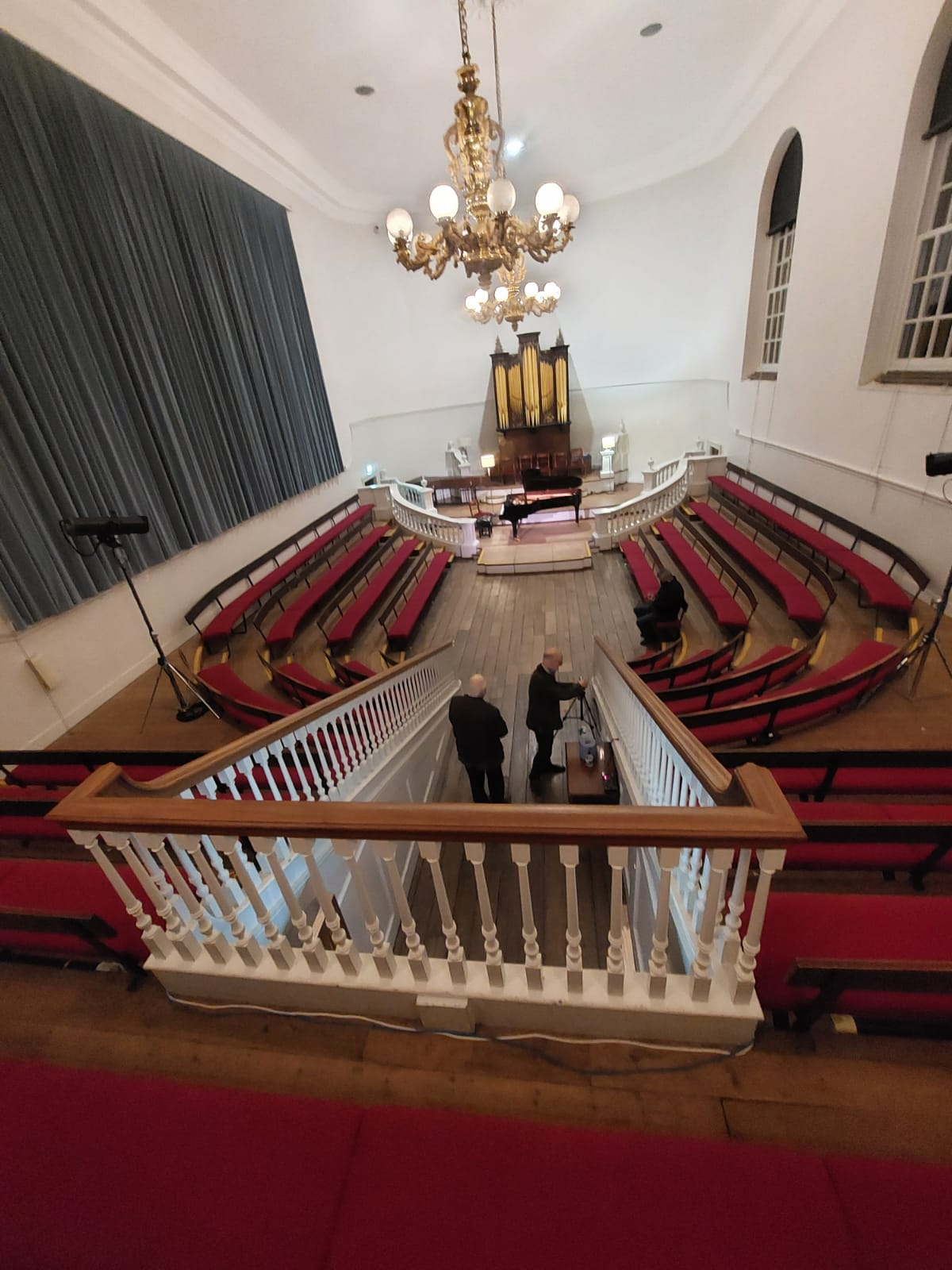
- Inside view of the Holywell Music Room, venue for OCMS concerts
- Abbreviation: OCMS
- Named after: Oxford University
- Predecessor: Oxford Ladies' Music Society (OLMS)
- Formation: 1898
- Founded at: Oxford
- Type: Nonprofit
- Legal status: Charity
- Purpose: Classical music
- Headquarters: Oxford
- Location: Oxford, United Kingdom
- Origins: Oxford Ladies' Music Society (1898–1968)
- Region served: Oxford
- Services: Concerts
- Field: Chamber music
- Official language: English
- Key people: Frank Bridge, Adolf Busch, Percy Grainger, Lionel Tertis, Hans Wessely
- Parent organization: University of Oxford
- Affiliations: Wadham College, Oxford
- Website: oxfordchambermusic.org

The Oxford Chamber Music Society (OCMS) is a music society based in Oxford, England, founded in 1898.

== History ==
The society was originally founded in 1898 as the Oxford Ladies' Musical Society (OLMS). The first concert was with all-female musicians, held at 115 High Street, Oxford. However, male musicians gradually joined, including Frank Bridge, Adolf Busch, Percy Grainger, Lionel Tertis, and Hans Wessely. From 1915 to 1940, the society held contents at the historic Holywell Music Room, where Handel performed in the 18th century. From the 1920s, concert listings included leading musicians such as Léon Goossens, Myra Hess, and Segovia, and string quartets such as the Busch Quartet, and the Griller Quartet. For 27 years, especially during the 1940s, the society met free of charge at Gunfield in Norham Gardens, North Oxford, with the sponsorship and support of the pianist Margaret Deneke and her sister Helena Deneke, who lived at Gunfield. The society changed its name to OCMS in 1968. Concerts at the Holywell Music Room restarted in 1987.

The archive of the Oxford Ladies' Musical Society is held by the Bodleian Library in Oxford.

== Present day ==
OCMS collaborates with Wadham College, Oxford. It organizes Sunday concerts in the Holywell Music Room.

== See also ==
- Oxford University Music Society
