= Helena Deneke =

English suffragist and Germanist (1878–1973)

Helena Clara Deneke
- Photograph of Helena Deneke
- Born: 19 May 1878; London, England
- Died: 26 September 1973 (aged 95); Freeland House, Freeland, Oxfordshire, England
- Monuments: Deneke Building (1932)
- Education: St Hugh's Hall, Oxford
- Occupations: Germanist, librarian, bursar
- Employer(s): St Hugh's Hall, Oxford, Lady Margaret Hall, Oxford, St Anne's College, Oxford
- Known for: Women's suffrage
- Relatives: Margaret Deneke (sister)

Helena Clara Deneke (1878–1973) was a British Germanist at Oxford University. She was an enthusiast for women's suffrage and for the Women's Institutes. She was "something of a legend in the Oxford of her day".

== Life ==
Helena Deneke was born in London on 19 May 1878, the oldest child of Philip Maurice Deneke (1842–1925), a German-born London merchant banker, and Clara Sophia Deneke (née Overweg, 1847–1933), of a landed Westphalian family. She was educated privately and at St Hugh's Hall, Oxford, where she befriended Grace Hadow, a fellow English student at Somerville College. Deneke gained a first in English in 1903. She became librarian of St Hugh's in 1904, initially teaching English, though switching to become tutor in German in 1909.

Deneke was active within the Oxford Women Students' Society for Women's Suffrage (OWSSWS), established in 1911 with Hadow as president. Deneke and Hadow joined the 1913 Great Pilgrimage for women's suffrage, and Deneke served as OWSSWS Secretary in 1914–15.

In 1913, she moved to Lady Margaret Hall as German tutor and bursar. She and her sister, the pianist Margaret Deneke, lived in a house, Gunfield, close to the college. The pair held highly regarded musical soirees at Gunfield, attended by guests including Albert Einstein and Albert Schweitzer.

Deneke was Treasurer of the National Union of Women's Suffrage Societies (NUWSS) until 1919, after which she threw her energies into establishing an Oxford Federation of Women's Institutes. In 1926, she was elected a Lady Margaret Hall fellow. Retiring from the college in 1938, she continued as a lecturer at St Anne's College until 1942.

As a result of her WI activity, Deneke and Betty Norris of the Townswomen's Guild were invited to play a political role in reconstructing women's organisations in post-war Germany. Deneke visited Germany seven times as a Visiting Expert in women's affairs, "making contact with nearly all German women of importance in German life". Their report, published in 1947, emphasised Deneke's hopes for Landfrauenvereine analogous to English WIs, and German women's immediate need for practical material aid rather than 'preaching' of democracy.

Helena Deneke died in Oxfordshire on 26 September 1973. She was buried on 1 October 1973 at Wolvercote Cemetery in Oxford, next to her sister Margaret. Her manuscript memoirs and personal papers are held at Lady Margaret Hall.

== Works ==
- 'Goethe's mind and art', Hibbert Journal, Vol. XXX (July 1932), pp. 626–637
- 'Some observations on Jean Paul', in German studies presented to Professor H.G. Fiedler, M.V.O., by pupils, colleagues, and friends on his seventy-fifth birthday. Oxford: Clarendon Press, 1938.
- Grace Hadow. Oxford: Oxford University Press, 1946.
- (with Betty Norris) The Women of Germany. London: The National Council of Social Services, 1947

== See also ==
- First women admitted to degrees at the University of Oxford
