= Edmund Hort New =

English artist (1871–1931)

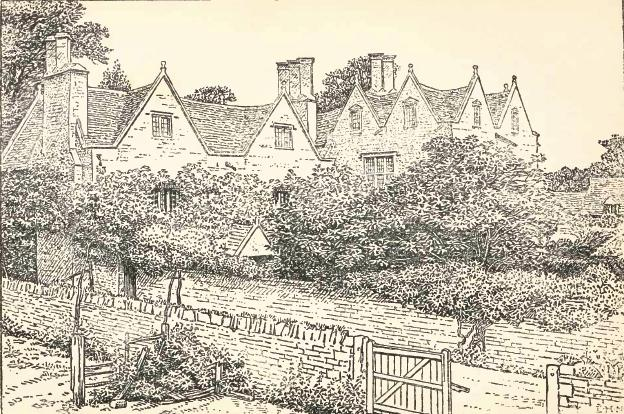
Kelmscott Manor, residence of William Morris

Edmund Hort New (December 1871 – 1931) was an English artist, member of the Birmingham Group, and leading illustrator of his day.

== Life and work ==
New was born in Evesham Worcestershire, a cousin of Thomas New. He studied at the Birmingham Municipal School of Art under Edward R. Taylor (headmaster of the school) and A. J. Gaskin, becoming known in the 1890s as an illustrator in the black-and-white style of the Arts and Crafts movement. He specialised in pen and ink drawings of rural and urban landscapes, old buildings and their interiors, architectural features, and also designed bookplates.

New provided illustrations for the English Illustrated Magazine and was commissioned by the Bodley Head publishing house (cofounded by John Lane) to work on critically acclaimed editions of books, such as The Compleat Angler by Izaak Walton and The Natural History of Selborne by Gilbert White.

In 1895, New was invited to meet William Morris at Kelmscott Manor, and went on to provide design work for the Kelmscott Press as well as illustrating Morris's two-volume biography by J. W. Mackail. Between 1896 and 1914, New provided hundreds of illustrations for over 50 books for various publishers (see booklist below). He also taught drawing to T. E. Lawrence ("Lawrence of Arabia").

In 1905, New moved from Evesham, the place of his birth, to Oxford where he started work on a series of drawings of the University of Oxford colleges, a project which was to occupy him for the rest of his life and remain unfinished. The drawings were engraved by Emery Walker and sold as the "New Loggan Prints". He also provided further illustrations for a series of books called the "College monographs" (see below).

In 1912 New designed the banner for the Oxford Women Students' Society for Women's Suffrage

In 1921 New exhibited at the first exhibition of the Society of Graphic Art in London.

New has been variously described as "deeply religious, scrupulous and patient in everything", "a life and a life's work of rare unity", "half artist and half saint", and "well read, especially in poetry and talked about art and literature with a sincerity that was very charming". He lived throughout his life on a modest income and suffered from diabetes. He was a member of the Society of Friends (Quakers).

== Books illustrated by E. H. New ==
- Alfred Austin. Haunts of Ancient peace (MacMillan & Co., 1902).
- Francis Bacon, Helen Milman (Ed.) On Gardens (John Lane, 1902).
- C. R. Ashbee, The Last Records of a Cotswold Community (Campden: Essex House Press, 1904).
- F. G. Brabant. Oxfordshire (Methuen & Co., 1906).
- F. G. Brabant. Sussex (Methuen, 1905).
- F. G. Brabant. The English Lakes (Methuen & Co. 1905).
- Egerton Castle. English book-plates: ancient and modern (G. Bell & Sons, 1893), pp 256–257.
- G. A. J. Cole. The Gypsy Road : A Journey from Krakow to Coblentz (MacMillan & Co., 1894).
- Algernon Gissing. Broadway: A Village of Middle England (E. P. Dutton, 1904).
- Algernon Gissing. Ludlow & Stokesay (J. M. Dent & Co., 1905).
- Alfred Harvey. Bristol, a Historical and Topographical Account of the City (Methuen & Co., 1906).
- C. G. Holme (Ed.). Modern book illustrators and their work (The Studio Ltd., 1914), pp 101–106.
- William Holden Hutton. Highways and Byways in Shakespeare's Country (MacMillan, 1914).
- William Angus Knight. Coleridge and Wordsworth in the West country : their friendship, work, and surroundings (Charles Scribner's Sons, 1914).
- F. A. H. Lambert. Surrey (Methuen and Co., 1903).
- J. W. Mackail. The Life of William Morris, Vol. 1 (Longmans, Green & Co., 1901).
- J. W. Mackail. The Life of William Morris, Vol. 2 (Longmans, Green & Co., 1901).
- Helen R. A. Milman. In the garden of peace (John Lane, The Bodley Head, 1896).
- Helen R. A. Milman (Mrs. Caldwell Crofton). Outside the Garden (John Lane the Bodley Head, 1900 - in the Open Air Series)
- E. H. New. Evesham (J. M. Dent & Co., 1904).
- A. Hamilton Thompson. Cambridge and its colleges (Methuen, 1898).
- E. H. New. The new Loggan guide to Oxford Colleges (Blackwell, 1932).
- Herbert W./ Tompkins. Hertfordshire (Methuen & Co., 1903/1922)
- Herbert W. Tompkins. Stratford on Avon (J. M. Dent 1904).
- Isaak Walton, Charles Cotton, Richard Le Gallienne (ed.). The Compleat Angler (John Lane, The Bodley Head, 1898).
- Lawrence Weaver. Sir Christopher Wren, scientist, scholar and architect (London, Offices of "Country life", 1923).
- Joseph Wells. Oxford and its Colleges (Methuen, 1903).
- Gilbert White, Grant Allen (Ed.).The Natural History of Selborne (John Lane The Bodley Head, 1897).
- B. C. A. Windle. Chester; a Historical and Topographical Account of the City (Methuen and Co., 1903).
- B. C. A. Windle. The Wessex of Thomas Hardy (London, New York, J. Lane, 1902).

The "College Monographs" series (Edited and illustrated by E. H. New)

- W. W. Rouse Ball. Trinity College Cambridge (J. M. Dent & Co., 1906).
- C. R. Fay. King's College, Cambridge (J. M. Dent & Co., 1907).
- A. R. Prickard. New College, Oxford
- R. F. Scott. St. John's College, Cambridge (J. M. Dent & Co., 1907).
- T. Herbert Warren. Magdalen College (J. M. Dent & Co., 1907).
- H. J. White. Merton College, Oxford (J. M. Dent & Co., 1907).
- Bertram C. A. Windle "Shakespeare's Country" (London & Methuen Co. 1899).
