= Margaret Deneke =

English pianist, musicologist, choirmaster, and benefactor

Margaret Clara Adele Deneke
- Margaret Deneke (right) playing piano with her sister Helena (left) (watercolour by Andrew Freeth RA)
- Born: 1882
- Died: 1969 (aged 86–87)
- Burial place: Wolvercote Cemetery, Oxford
- Monuments: Deneke Building (1932)
- Occupations: Pianist, musicologist, choirmaster, benefactor
- Years active: 1900–1969
- Employer: Lady Margaret Hall, Oxford
- Known for: Philanthropy
- Relatives: Helena Deneke (sister)

Notes
- Lived at Gunfield, 19 Norham Gardens, Oxford

Margaret Clara Adele Deneke (1882–1969) was an English pianist, musicologist, choirmaster, and benefactor of Lady Margaret Hall in Oxford.

== Biography ==
Margaret Deneke was born in 1882. She was the daughter of Philip Maurice Deneke (1842–1925), a London-based merchant banker who was born in Germany, and his wife, Clara Sophia Deneke (née Overweg, 1847–1933), who was from a Westphalian family.

Deneke lived with her sister, Helena Deneke, a German tutor and bursar, at Lady Margaret Hall, an originally women-only Oxford college at Gunfield, 19 Norham Gardens, near to the college. The sisters held soirees in the music room at Gunfield, attended by guests including Albert Einstein and Albert Schweitzer.

For 27 years in the mid-20th century, the Oxford Ladies' Music Society (now the Oxford Chamber Music Society) met at Gunfield free of charge, with Margaret Deneke's sponsorship and support. Deneke, as well as being a pianist, was also the choirmaster at Lady Margaret Hall. She raised significant funds through concerts and lecture-recitals, becoming one of the college's benefactors.

== Legacy ==
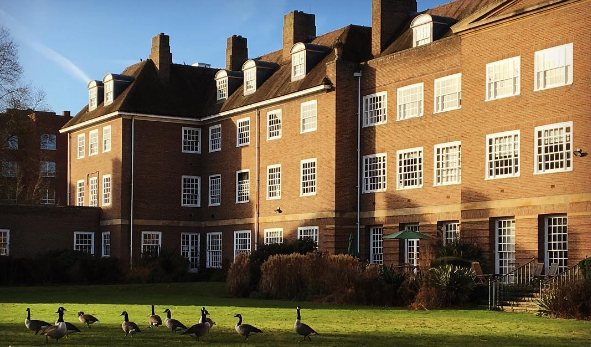
The Deneke Building at Lady Margaret Hall, Oxford

Her portrait, with her sister, now located at Lady Margaret Hall, was painted in watercolour by Hubert Andrew Freeth RA. Some of her papers, along with those of her sister, are held in the archive of Lady Margaret Hall and some of her correspondence is held in the archives of the Bodleian Library in Oxford. She corresponded with the likes of the composer Ralph Vaughan Williams and author and activist Helen Keller.

There is now a Deneke Building at Lady Margaret Hall, designed by Giles Gilbert Scott and completed in 1932. During a recital tour of the United States, which Margaret Deneke undertook regularly to support the college financially, the American philanthropist Mary Stillman Harkness, the wife of Edward Harkness, gave a benefaction to her of £35,000. Mrs Harkness insisted that any building made possible by her gift should be named "after those who worked for it and not after those who merely gave money", hence the name of the building. She was buried on 7 March 1969 at Wolvercote Cemetery. Four years later, her sister Helena was buried next to her.
