= Andrew Foreshew-Cain =

Church of England vicar and gay rights activist

The Reverend Andrew Foreshew-Cain
- Born: Andrew Cain
- Occupations: priest; vicar; chaplain
- Spouse: Steve Foreshew-Cain

Ecclesiastical career
- Religion: Christianity
- Church: Church of England

Andrew Foreshew-Cain (né Andrew Cain) is a Church of England priest. From 2019–2024 he was chaplain of Lady Margaret Hall in the University of Oxford.

He married his partner of 14 years, Steve Foreshew, in 2014. He was the first Anglican vicar and second priest to be in a same-sex marriage, despite the Church of England's opposition.

After his wedding, although he kept his position at St Mary with All Souls in Kilburn, and St James' in West Hampstead, he was blacklisted from getting another job within the church. He resigned as priest and member of the General Synod in 2017, citing institutional homophobia within the church.

Because of his marriage, the Archbishop of Canterbury, Justin Welby, did not want him to become chaplain of Lady Margaret Hall at the University of Oxford. Nevertheless, he was given the role in 2019 by Alan Rusbridger, principal of the college, as appointments at Oxford colleges are outside the local bishop's jurisdiction.

He is the co-founder of Equal, the Campaign for Equal Marriage in the Church of England, a group calling for the church to accept same-sex marriages.
