= Gunfield =

1877 house in Oxford, England

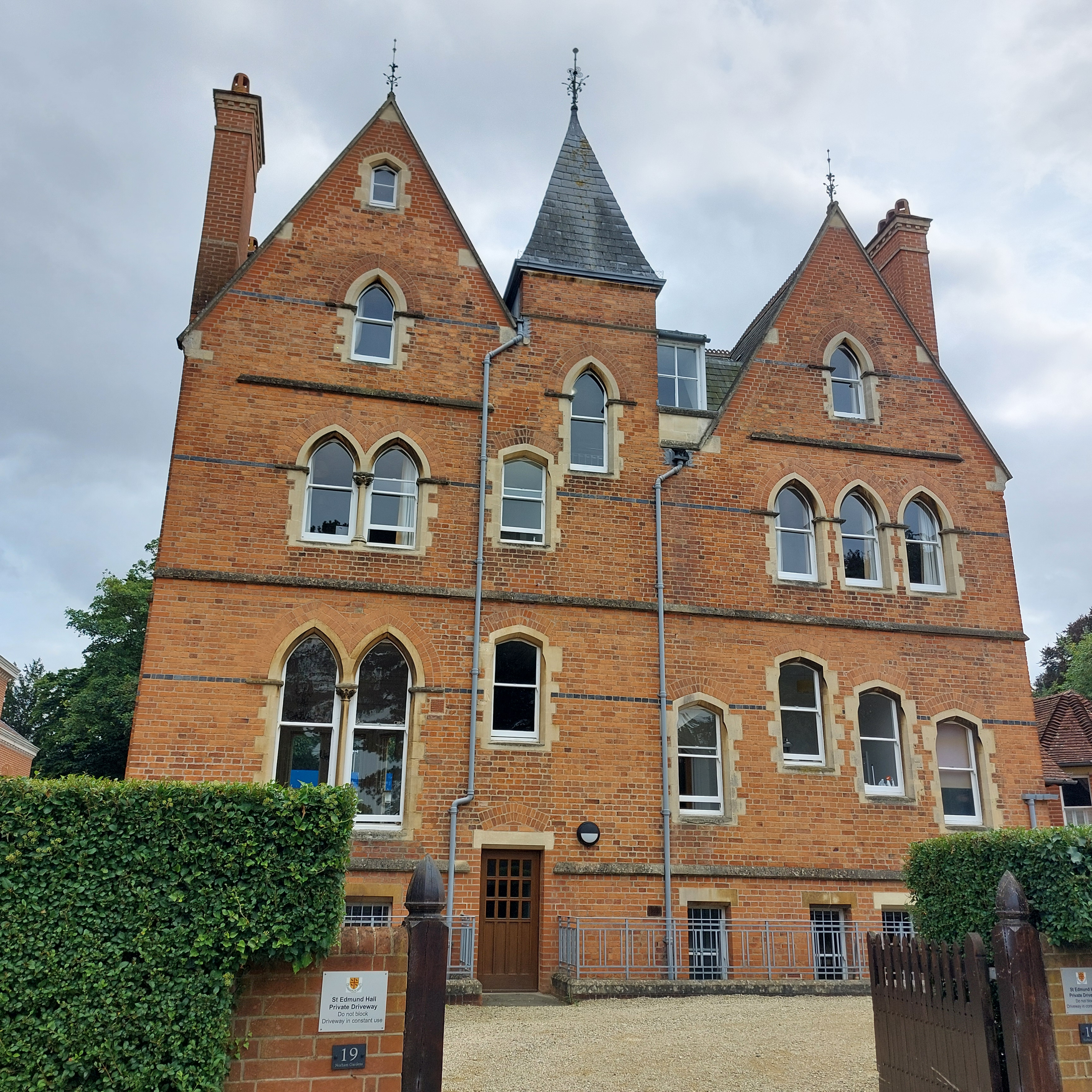
- Front facade of the house
- Alternative names: 19 Norham Gardens

General information
- Status: St Edmund Hall Graduate Centre
- Type: House
- Architectural style: Gothic Revival
- Location: 19 Norham Gardens, Oxford OX2 6PS, UK, Oxford, United Kingdom
- Coordinates: 51°45′51.181″N 1°15′17.104″W
- Year built: 1876–7
- Construction started: 1876
- Completed: 1877
- Owner: Mary Jephson; Norah Jephson; Lady Margaret Hall; St Edmund Hall

Technical details
- Material: Red brick with stone dressing
- Floor count: 4

Design and construction
- Architect: Frederick Codd

Gunfield is a large detached Gothic Revival house in Norham Gardens, North Oxford, a Victorian suburb of Oxford, England. It was designed by the architect Frederick Codd (1799–1881) and completed in 1877. It is located on the Norham Manor estate, backing onto the University Parks, at the junction of Norham Gardens and Fyfield Road, close to Lady Margaret Hall, an Oxford college. The house was Grade II listed in 1992.

The house is built in red brick with stone dressings. It has tall chimneys and gables separated by a tower at the front, and with a tiled roof. There are two main storeys, attic rooms, and a semi-basement (four storeys in total). A loggia with a balustrade was added to the rear in the early 20th century. The house included fireplaces with William De Morgan tiles.

== History ==
The first leaseholder was the philanthropist Mary Jephson (1823–1892), who named the house "Gunfield". She lived there with her mother Ann Sarah Jephson (1796–1878), widow of the Rev. William Jephson, M.A., and some of her sisters. She died at Gunfield in 1892 and was buried in St Sepulchre's Cemetery, Oxford. Her sister Norah Jephson, also a philanthropist, who was still living at Gunfield, died in 1899 at the home of her brother-in-law Harry Webb in Winchester. Norah Jephson left Gunfield in her will to her friend Elizabeth Wordsworth (1840–1932), the first Principal of the nearby women-only Lady Margaret Hall (LMH) during 1879–1909, for the use of the Hall.

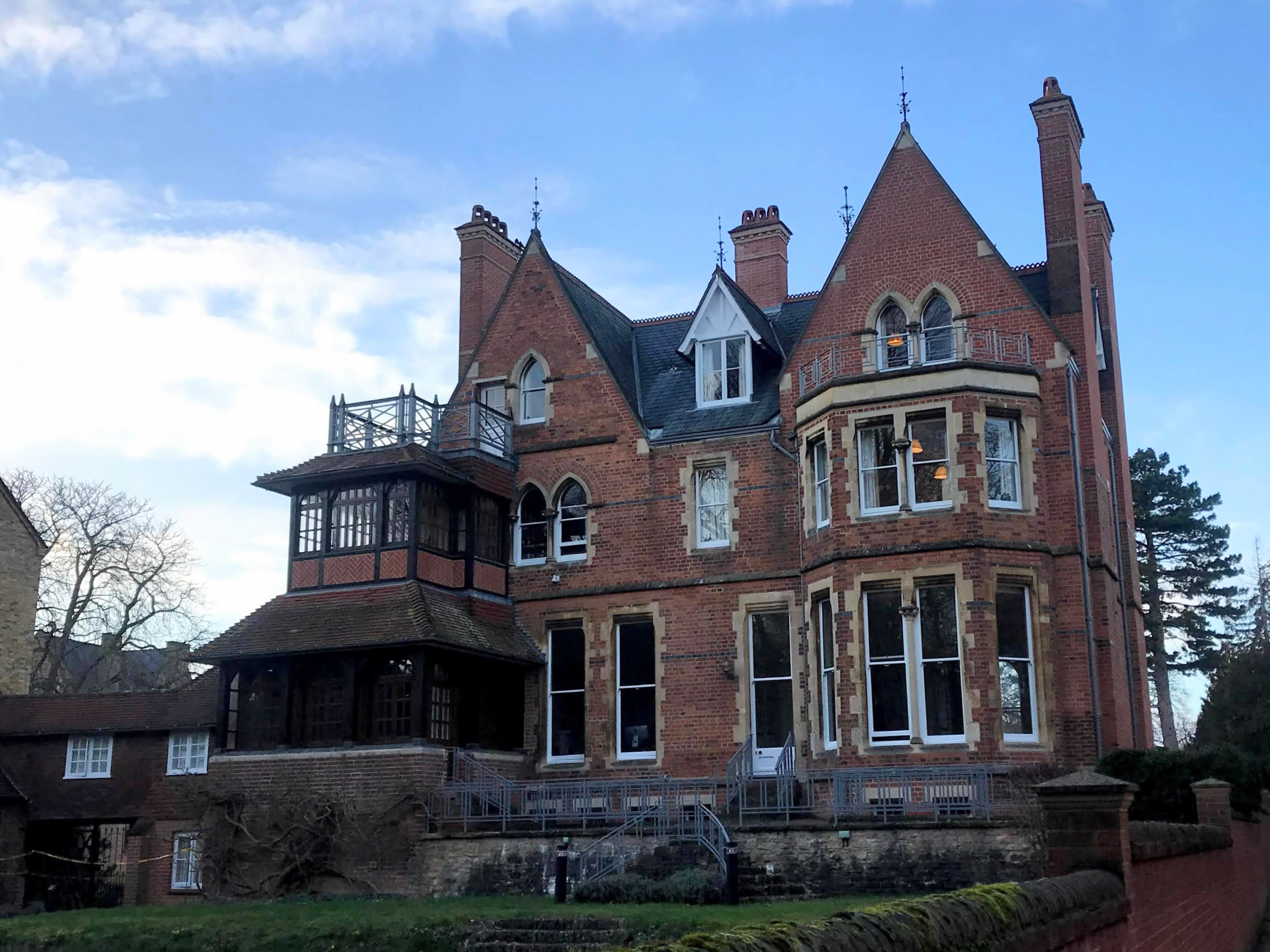
Rear view of the house, including the loggia

In 1909, a chapel was added to the site, designed by NW & GA Harrison. In 1915, the house and chapel were joined by Arthur Hamilton Moberly. A loggia looking onto the rear garden was also added by Moberly. An extension and garage were built by the former chapel (later a music room), and the main chapel window was changed during the 1930s.

In the 20th century for almost five decades, Gunfield was the home of the Deneke family, including Helena Deneke (1878–1973), a bursar and German tutor at Lady Margaret Hall, and her younger sister, the pianist Margaret Deneke (1882–1969). The sisters held musical soirees at Gunfield, attended by guests including Albert Einstein and Albert Schweitzer.

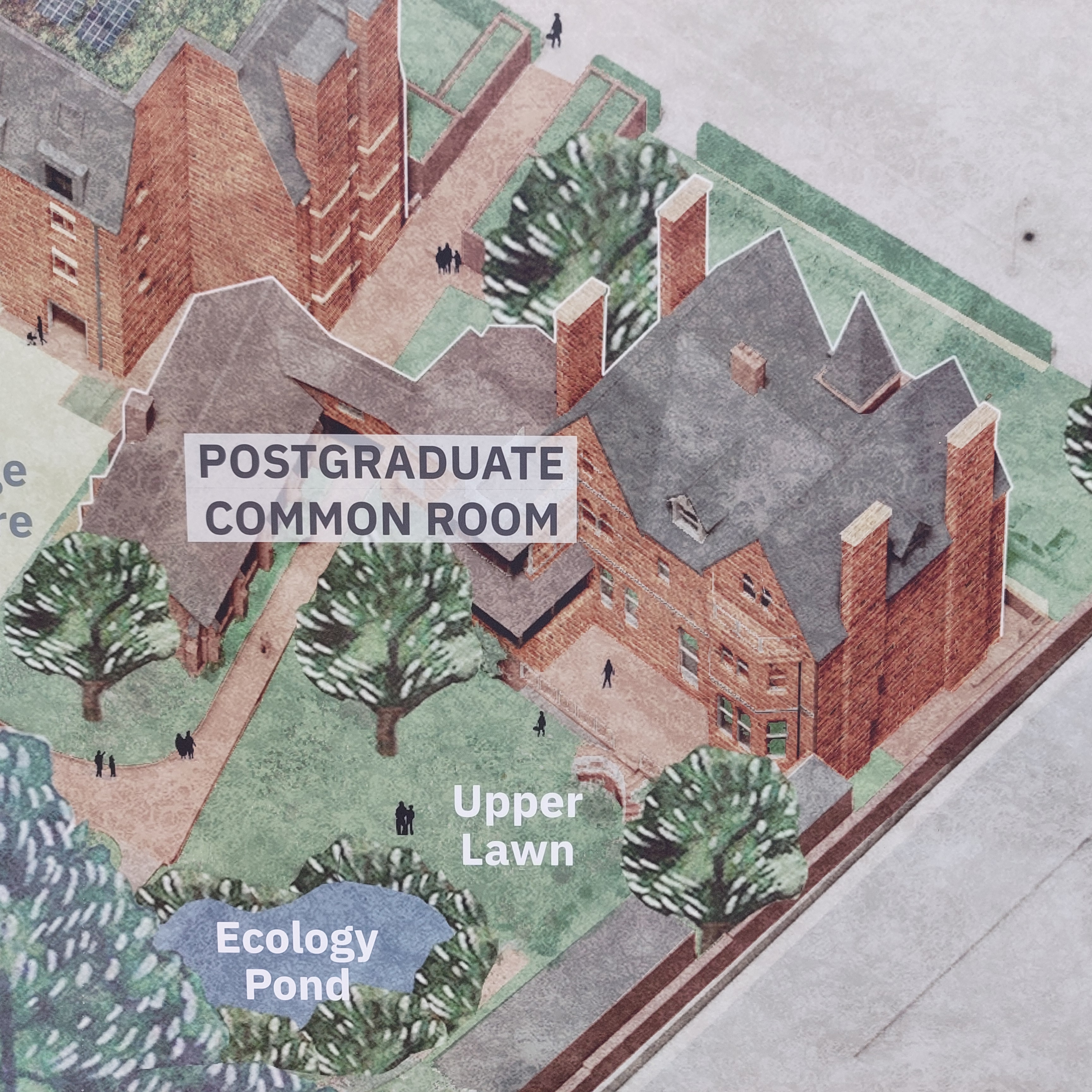
Aerial view of Gunfield on a sign for the Norham St Edmund development by St Edmund Hall

By the 1970s, the windows on the south side of the chapel had been blocked off by a fireplace and chimney, with the space occupied by a college Fellow. In 1979, Gunfield came into the possession of St Edmund Hall, another Oxford college, which used the former chapel and music room as its Middle Common Room (MCR) for graduate students. In 1992, Howes, Montgomery & Allen refurbished Gunfield for St Edmund Hall. The Rhodes Trust donated £25,000 towards the refurbishment. The work undertaken included an extension to the link building, enclosure of the previously open verandah, rebuilding of the chimneys and roof, and new windows. At the same time, the building was Grade II listed.

== Present day ==
The building is now a Graduate Centre for St Edmund Hall, one of the Oxford University colleges, along with other houses in Norham Gardens used for its student accommodation. As of 2023, the college is developing the site and the adjacent 17 Norham Gardens as "Norham St Edmund" (NSE). During the initial archaeological search, a Roman copper-alloy brooch dating from around 40AD to 200AD was discovered on the site.
