= Eleanor Plumer =

Eleanor Mary Plumer (22 July 1885 – 29 June 1967) was a British academic administrator. She was the eldest daughter of Field Marshal Herbert Plumer.

== Career ==
After studying English at King's College London, she worked there as a lecturer and tutor to women students.

In 1924 she became Warden of the Mary Ward Settlement and from 1927 to 1931 of St Andrew's Hall, University of Reading.

In 1936 she was appointed to the Board of Governors of the British Film Institute. She was also a member of the Cinematograph Films Advisory Committee to the Board of Trade and of the Departmental Committee on the Cinematograph Films Act 1927.

She was appointed Principal of the Society of Oxford Home-Students in 1940 and oversaw it's change to become St Anne's Society in 1942 and then St Anne's College in 1952. She retired in 1953.

Academic offices
Preceded by Grace Eleanor Hadow	Principal of St Anne's College, Oxford; 1940—1953	Succeeded by Mary Ogilvie
