= Grace Eleanor Hadow =

English author (1875–1940)

Grace Eleanor Hadow OBE
- Grace Hadow
- Born: 9 December 1875; South Cerney, England
- Died: 19 January 1940 (aged 64); Marylebone, London
- Resting place: Wolvercote Cemetery, Oxford
- Education: Brownshill Court School; Somerville College, Oxford
- Occupations: Author, principal of St Anne's College, Oxford and vice-chairman of the Women's Institute
- Writing career
- Language: English
- Notable works: Chaucer and His Times, Wayfaring in Olden Times, The Oxford Treasury of English Literature

Grace Eleanor Hadow OBE (9 December 1875 – 19 January 1940) was an author, principal of what would become St Anne's College, Oxford and vice-chair of the National Federation of Women's Institutes (NFWI).

== Life ==
Hadow was born in 1875 at South Cerney vicarage, near Cirencester. She was the youngest child and fourth daughter of the Reverend William Elliott Hadow and Mary Lang née Cornish. Her godfather was Sir William Henry Hadow who was also her elder brother.

In 1888, aged 13, Hadow won a scholarship to study at Brownshill Court School, Stroud. From the age of 16, she attended Truro High School, where she was head girl. In 1894, she went to Trier in Germany for a year to study language and music. From 1899 to 1900, she taught at Cheltenham Ladies' College. In 1900, she began to study English at Somerville College, Oxford, but as a woman she was not allowed to receive a degree, although she could sit exams and took first-class honours in 1903. While a student, she became president of the Women's Debating Society.

In 1903, Hadow went to teach at Bryn Mawr in the United States. She returned to Oxford in 1904 to work as a don, becoming a tutor at Lady Margaret Hall in 1906. In 1908 she published The Oxford Treasury of English Literature: Growth of the drama, which would grow to three volumes. Her other publications included a selection of the works of John Dryden (1908) and editions of Robert Browning's Men and Women (1911) and Walter Raleigh's The Historie of the World (1917).

Hadow was a Suffragist and established the Cirencester Women's Suffrage Society. Her sister, Constance Hadow, was also a founder member. This was affiliated to Millicent Fawcett's National Union of Women's Suffrage Societies and she was Honorary Secretary from 1911 to 1917. She was also the Secretary of the Cirencester branch of the Conservative and Unionist Women's Franchise Association.

During the First World War, she was a member of the War Agricultural Committee and founded the Gloucestershire Women's Institute (WI). In 1917, the National Federation of Women's Institutes was formed. On 16 October, Lady Denman and Hadow were elected chair and vice-chair and Alice Williams was elected honorary secretary and treasurer. Hadow would remain vice-chair for the rest of her life.

From February 1917, she had responsibility for the health and welfare of women munitions workers at the Ministry of Munitions. There her work and ideas impressed Professor W. G. S. Adams and, late in 1918, he persuaded her to become Secretary of the recently founded Barnett House at Oxford. Together with Adams, she started the Oxfordshire Rural Community Council and guided the movement that saw rural community councils established in many other counties. In this endeavour, she worked closely with the National Council of Social Service, later becoming a member of its executive committee.

In 1921, she declined the position of Principal of Lady Margaret Hall in order to remain at Barnett House and work with Adams in implementing a Plunkett Foundation programme for the relief of rural disadvantage, and in the same year she wrote the first edition of the National Federation of Women's Institutes (NFWI) handbook. From 1929 to 1940, she was Principal of the Society of Oxford Home Students (later St Anne's College. During this period she lived at 7 Fyfield Road, Oxford, and is remembered there by an Oxfordshire Blue Plaque.

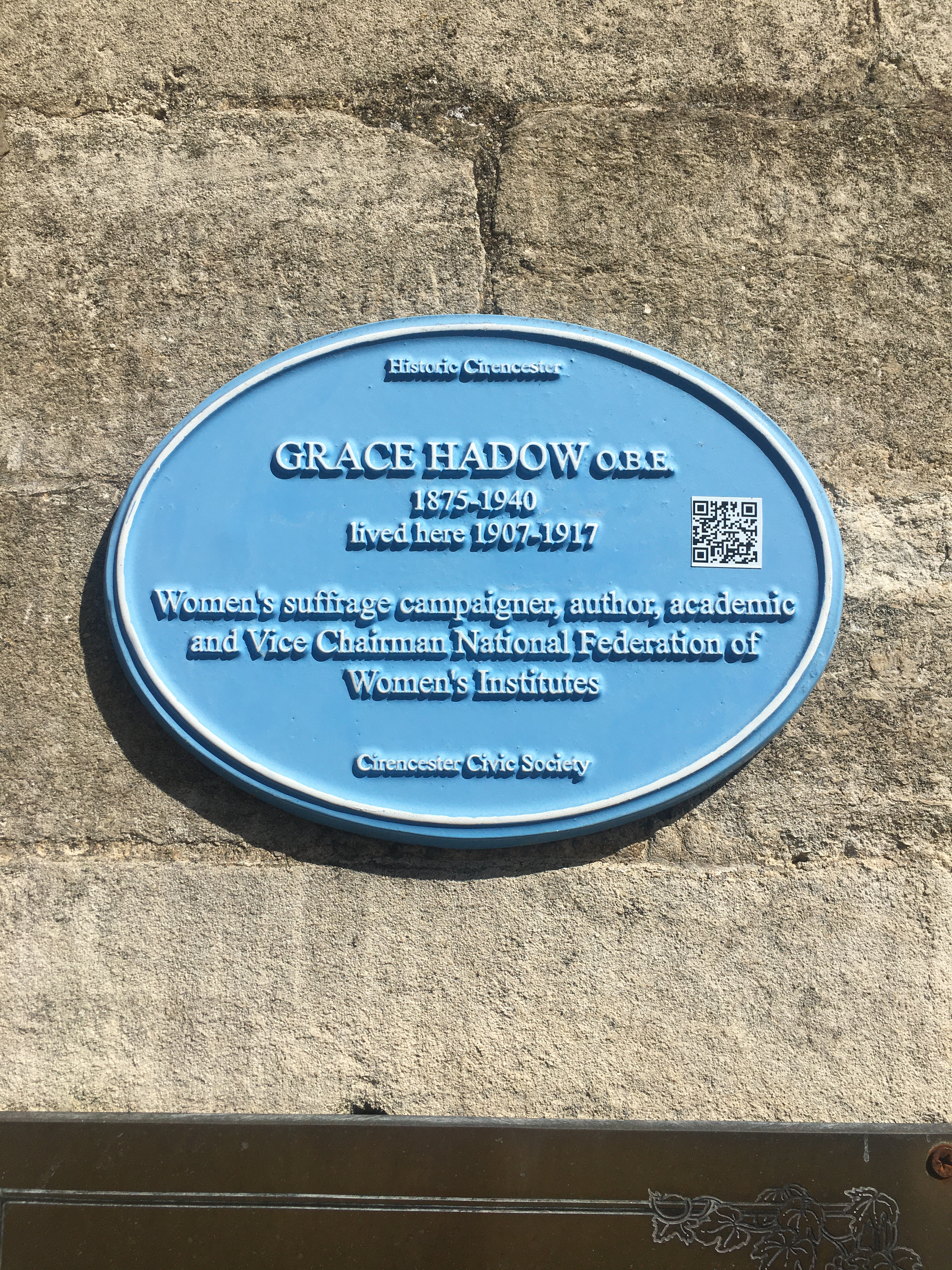
Hadow's blue plaque in Cirencester dedicated to her life and work

In 1938, she was the only British woman delegate at the British Commonwealth relations conference in Sydney, Australia, and then set out on a long speaking tour of the United States. She was said to be one of the best women speakers. She arrived back in the UK as the country prepared itself for war and in 1940 died from pneumonia at 11 Beaumont Street, Marylebone, London.

The historian, Brian Harrison, interviewed 3 of Hadow's nieces (Christine and Rachel in July 1978, and Enid in August 1979) as part of the Suffrage Interviews project. The three nieces recall Grace's relationship with her siblings, particularly Constance, and their family life, as well as her success with the Women's Institutes.

== Publications ==
- Oxford Treasury of English Literature, edited with her brother, W. H. Hadow (3 vols, 1907–08)
- Ideals of Living (1911) Sidgwick & Jackson Ltd, England
- Clara Schumann: An Artist's Life (1913), translated and edited by Hadow from Berthold Litzmann's German original
- Chaucer and His Times (1914), Williams and Norgate, London
- Wayfaring in Olden Times (1928). Pamphlet published by the BBC, London

Academic offices
Preceded by Christine Burrows	Principal of St Anne's College, Oxford; 1929—1940	Succeeded by Eleanor Plumer
