= Bertha Johnson =

English promoter of women's higher education

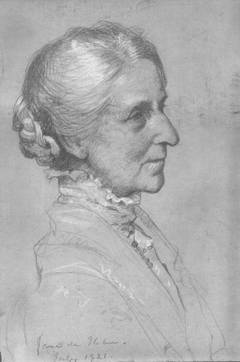
- Born: Bertha Jane Todd; January 20, 1846; Charing Cross, England
- Died: April 24, 1927 (aged 81); Oxford, England
- Known for: Principal of the Society of Oxford Home Students, later St Anne's College, Oxford
- Spouse: Arthur Johnson (m. 1873)
- Children: 2

Bertha Jane Johnson (née Todd; 20 January 1846 – 24 April 1927), was the principal of the Society of Oxford Home Students, which would become St Anne's College, University of Oxford, and a campaigner for women's education.

== Life ==
Bertha J. Todd was born in London on 20 January 1846 to Elizabeth Mary Hart (1815–1894) and Dr. Robert Bentley Todd, FRS (1809–1860). Her father was an enthusiast for nursing and he was a professor at King's College, London. Her grandfather was Charles Hawkes Todd. Her uncles included John Hart, James Henthord Todd, William Gowan Todd, and Armstrong Todd.

She grew up with two older sisters and one younger brother:

- Elizabeth Marion Todd (1841–1917) unmarried,
- Alice Margaret Todd (1843–1916) unmarried, and
- James Henthorn Todd (1847–1891) unmarried.

Bertha was educated at home. She excelled at music and the arts. She played the piano. Her art work was exhibited at the Royal Academy. She was one of the first women students at the Slade School of Art.

In 1873 she married the Reverend Arthur Henry Johnson, historian and chaplain of All Souls College, Oxford (and Oxford University's 1874 FA Cup winner), and they both enjoyed Oxford university life. He was a curate who also lectured in history. Following their marriage, the couple lived at 22 Norham Gardens on the Norham Manor estate in North Oxford. They subsequently lived at 8 Merton Street before settling at 5 South Parks Road.

The couple had two children:

- Robert Arthur Johnson (1874–1938)
- George Wilfrid Johnson, (1876–1930)

Robert became Deputy Master and Controller of the Royal Mint. George became headmaster of Alleyne's School, Stevenage.

== Advocate for women's education ==
Bertha Johnson co-founded the Association for Promoting the Higher Education of Women in Oxford and helped set up Lady Margaret Hall and Somerville Hall. Oxford was catching up on Cambridge which had established university level education for women. The ambition in Oxford in time overtook Johnson's ambitions and she became a voice arguing against further progress.

From 1894 to 1921 Bertha was the principal of the Society of Oxford Home Students, which would later become St Anne's College, Oxford.

Academic offices
Preceded by First in post	Principal of St Anne's College, Oxford; 1894—1921	Succeeded by Christine Burrows
