= Charles Hawkes =

Charles Hawkes may refer to:

- Charles Christopher Hawkes (1905–1992), English archaeologist
- Charles Hawkes (priest), Anglican priest in Ireland

== See also ==
- Charles Hawkes Todd (1784–1826), medical doctor
