= Reginald Harrison =

British surgeon (1837–1908)

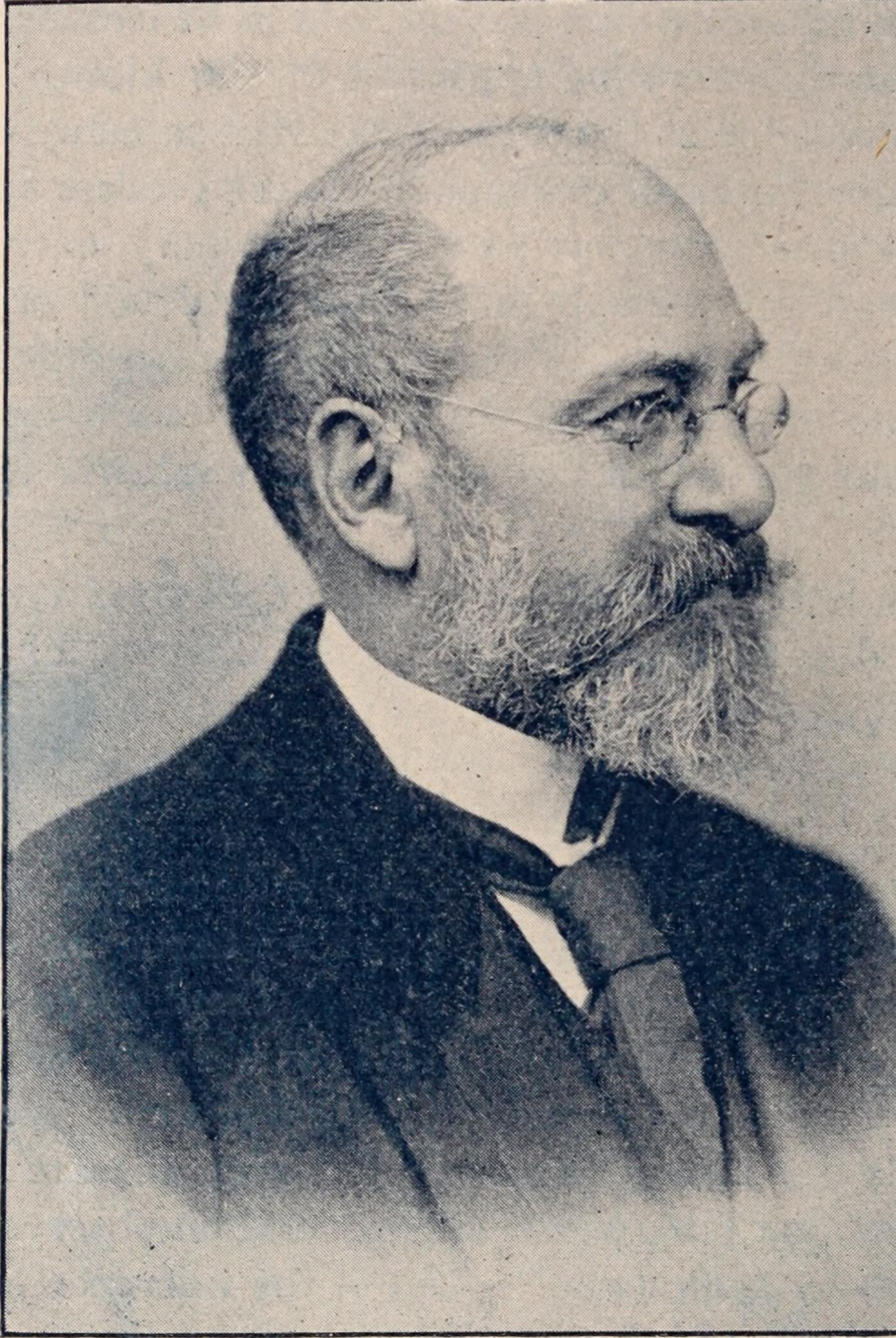
Reginald Harrison

Reginald Harrison KStJ FRCS (24 August 1837 – 28 February 1908) was a British surgeon, sometime vice-president and Member of the Council of the Royal College of Surgeons and Consulting Surgeon to St Peter's Hospital.

== Life ==
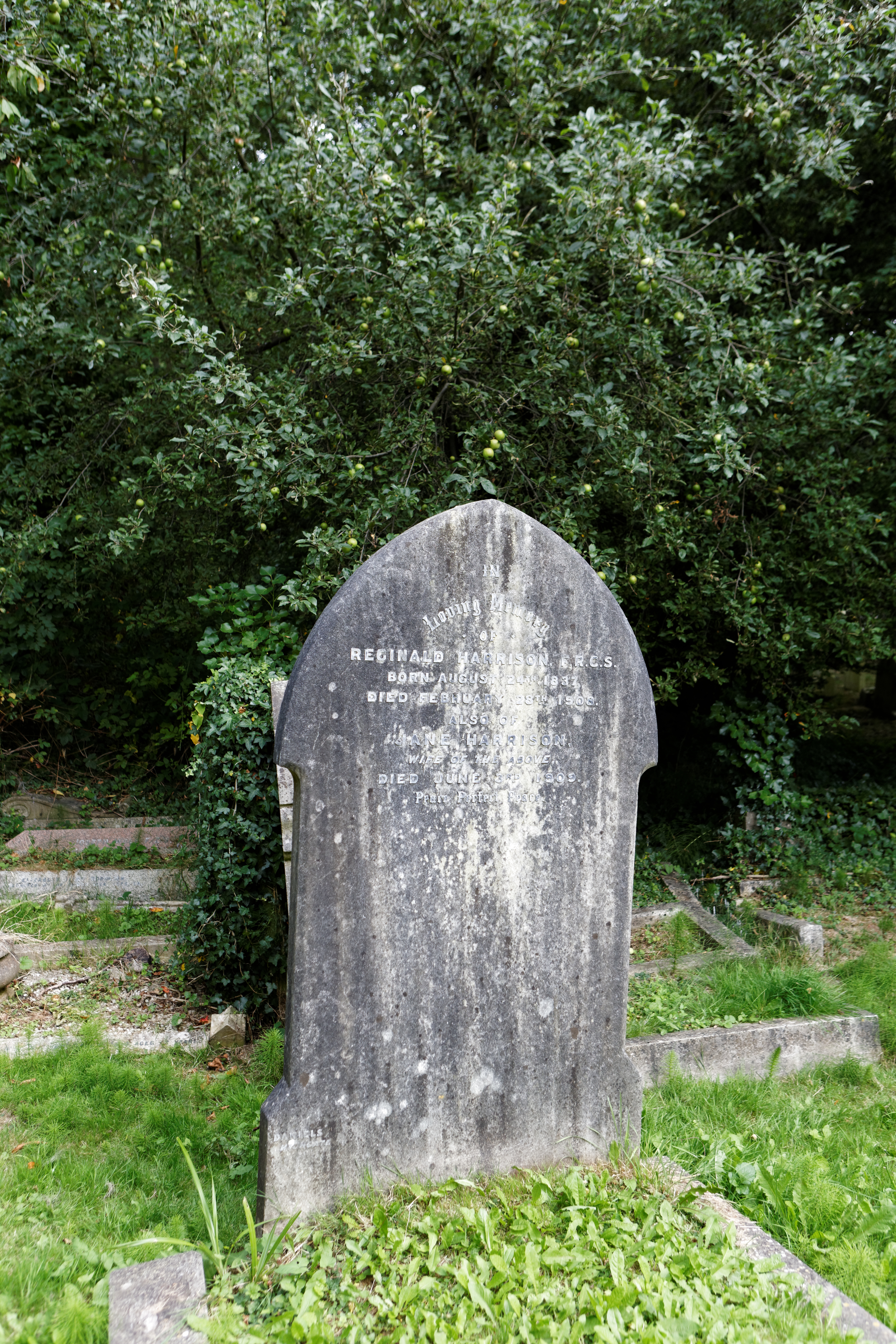
Harrison's grave in Highgate Cemetery

Harrison was educated at Rossall School, Lancashire, and after a short period of probation at the Stafford general hospital, he entered St. Bartholomew's Hospital, London, qualifying in 1859. In 1866 he returned to Lancashire to take up an appointment as assistant physician to the Liverpool Royal Infirmary becoming full surgeon in 1874, later to specialise in diseases of the male genito-urinary system.

In 1889 he returned to London as surgeon to St. Peter's Hospital for Stone and Other Urinary Diseases. He was the author of Surgical Disorders of the Urinary Organs, which became a standard text-book, and The Use of the Ambulance in Civil Practice, having taken an active part in the introduction of the ambulance system in Liverpool, an interest he continued in London, remaining president of the Street Ambulance Association until death.

He was admitted M.R.C.S. England on 15 April 1869, and in the same year he obtained the licence of the society of apothecaries.

He played an active part in the development of the Ambulance Service in Great Britain, and was also made Knight of Grace of the Venerable Order of St John of Jerusalem on 5 March 1903.

He ceased active professional work in April 1906, when he resigned his post at St. Peter's hospital.

He died on 28 April 1908, and was buried at Highgate Cemetery.

== Family ==
He married in 1864 Jane, only daughter of James Baron of Liverpool, and left one son and two daughters.
