= Robert Bentley Todd =

British Irish-born 19th century physician

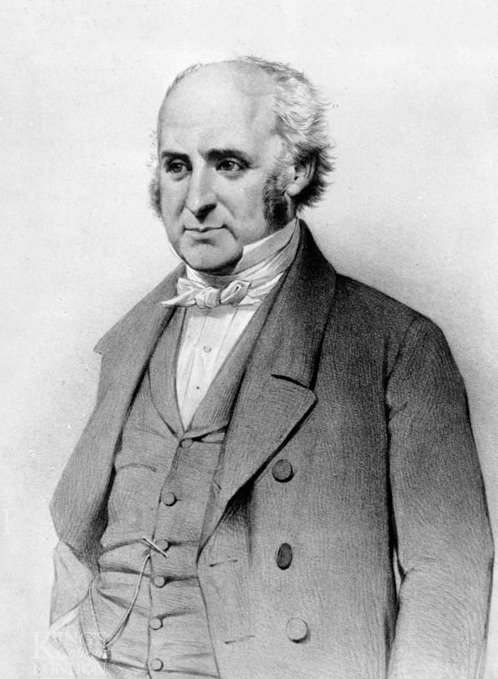
- Robert Bentley Todd
- Born: 9 April 1809; Dublin, Ireland
- Died: 30 January 1860 (aged 50); London, England
- Education: Trinity College, Dublin BA, Pembroke College, Oxford MS, BM, DM
- Known for: Todd's palsy
- Scientific career
- Fields: Medicine
- Workplaces: King's College London; Royal Society; Royal College of Physicians; Royal College of Surgeons

Robert Bentley Todd (9 April 1809 – 30 January 1860) was an Irish-born physician who is best known for describing the condition postictal paralysis in his Lumleian Lectures in 1849 now known as Todd's palsy.

== Early life ==
The son of physician Charles Hawkes Todd (1784–1826) and Elizabeth Bentley (1783–1862), Robert was born in Dublin, Ireland, on 9 April 1809. He was the younger brother of noted writer and minister Rev. James Henthorn Todd, D.D. He is the older brother of Rev. William Gowan Todd, D.D. and Armstrong Todd, MD.

Robert attended day school and was tutored by the Rev. William Higgin (1793–1867), who later became bishop of the Diocese of Derry and Raphoe.

Todd entered Trinity College, Dublin in 1825, intending to study for the bar. When his father died the next year, he switched to medicine and became a resident pupil at a hospital in Dublin. He was a student of Robert Graves, and graduated B.A. at Trinity in 1829. He became licensed at the Royal College of Surgeons in Ireland two years later.

At Hassel by Hull, Yorkshire, Robert Bentley Todd married Elizabeth Mary née Hart (1814–1894) 20 December 1836. The younger sister of Capt. John Hart M.P. (1808–1873) [Australian Dictionary of Biography], Elizabeth was baptized at St John's, Hackney, the daughter of journalist John Harriot Hart and Mary née Glanville on 23 June 1814. In one of the most sensational cases of its day, John Herriot Hart co-owner of The Whig Independent newspaper was imprisoned in Gloucester Gaol for libel [Annual Register vol 72 p. 74], before being transported to Tenerife. It is presumed that he died on the return voyage to England.

Elizabeth is not the only member of the Hart family to marry into the Todd family. Robert's younger sister, Margaret Gillmor Todd (1817–1876), married Elizabeth's brother, Capt. John Hart, a Premier of South Australia.

The children of Robert Bentley Todd and Elizabeth née Hart; were

- Elizabeth Marion Todd (1841–1917), unmarried,
- Alice Margaret Todd (1843–1916), unmarried,
- Bertha [Todd] Johnson (1846–1927), Principal of St Anne's College, University of Oxford, and
- James Henthorn Todd (1848–1891), unmarried; died near Bombay, India, 14 August 1891.

== Professional life ==
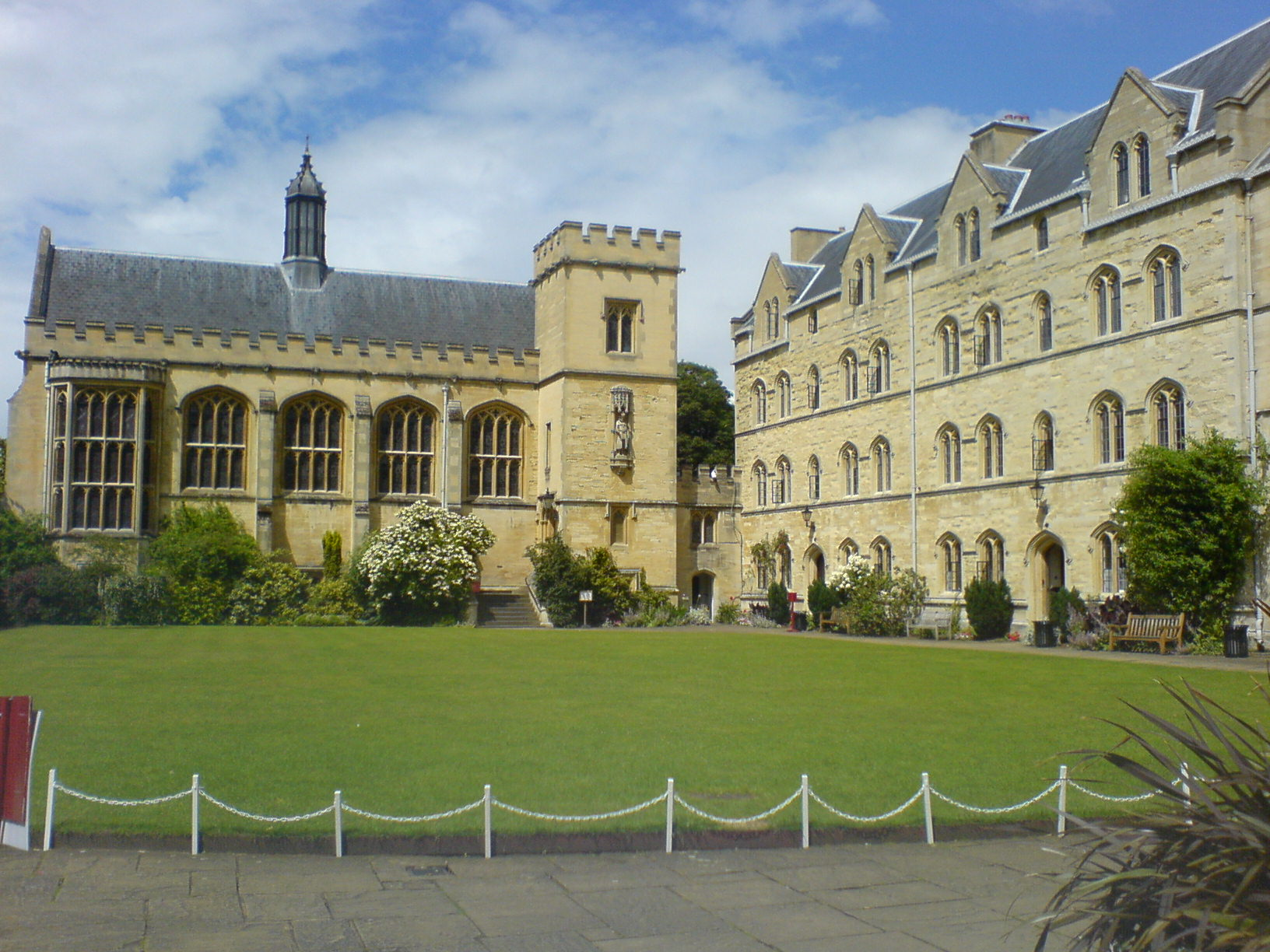
Pembroke Chapel Quad.

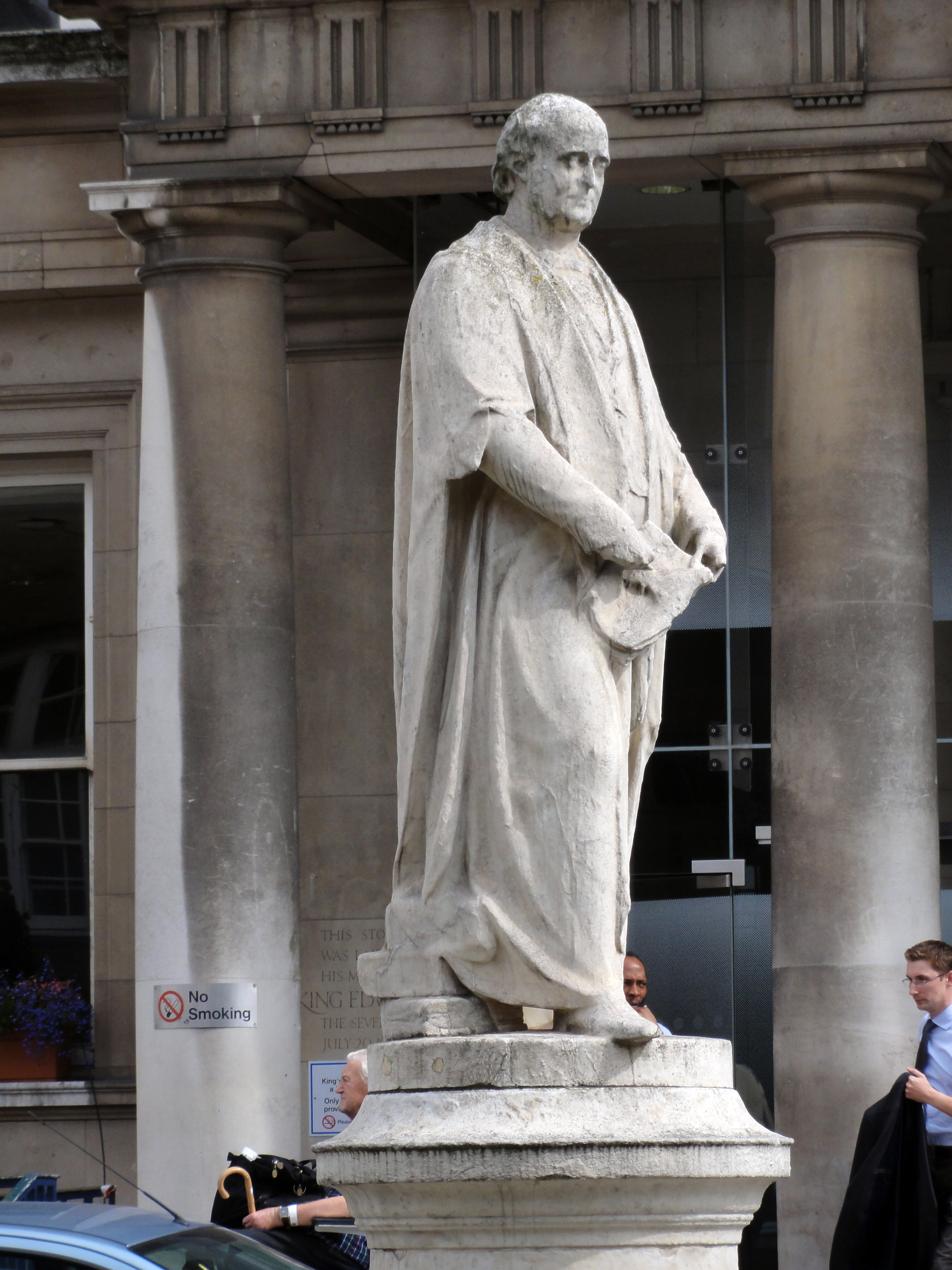
Statue of Robert Bentley Todd at King's College Hospital

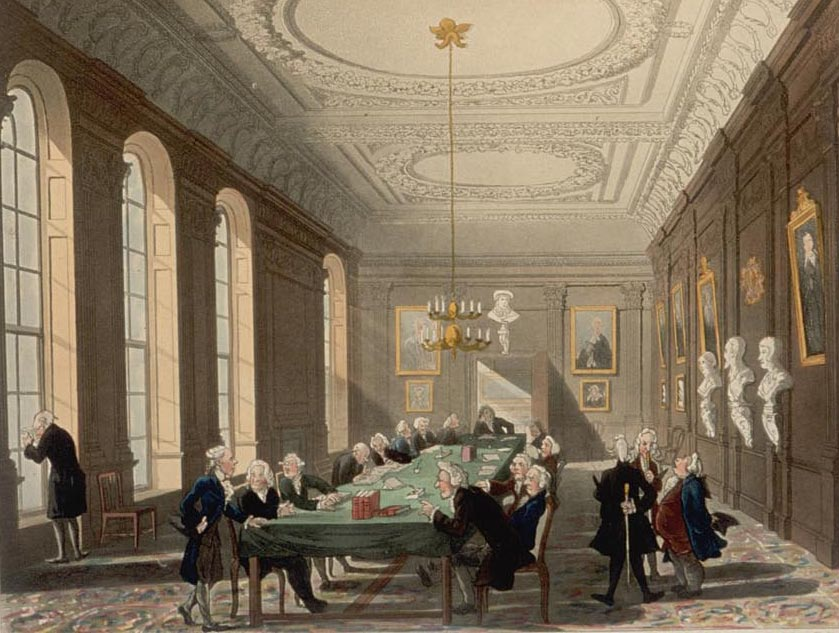
A meeting of the College of Physicians in the early 19th century

He then moved to London, where he practised medicine and lectured. He received a M.S. at Pembroke College, Oxford in 1832, a B.M. the following year, and a D.M. in 1836. He travelled widely in Europe, lecturing and becoming acquainted with a number of eminent men in his field. He took the license of the Royal College of Physicians in 1833, became a Fellow in 1837, and a Censor in 1839–1840. He was made a Fellow of the Royal Society and served on the council in 1838–1839. In 1836–1837 he served on a sub-committee of the British Association to inquire into the motions of the heart, and in 1839–1840 was Examiner for the University of London. In 1844 he was elected Fellow of the Royal College of Surgeons.

Todd's abiding interests were in physiological medicine (a field then in its infancy) and in the improvement of hospital nursing, and always held to a high standard of general and religious knowledge. He became a Professor at King's College London in 1836 and was prominent in the opening of King's College Hospital in 1840, and in the founding of its new building in 1851. It was largely through his advocacy that the Sisters of St John's commenced nursing at King's College Hospital.

Todd's increasing practice forced him to resign his professorship in 1853, and in the final years of his life, his practice grew enormously. In failing health, he was finally forced to give up his clinical lectures at the hospital that he had helped found.

Robert Bentley Todd died in his consulting rooms at his home located at 26 Brook Street, Grosvenor Square, Westminster, on 30 January 1860. He died of a gastrointestinal haemorrhage. He was buried at All Souls, Kensal Green, on 4 February 1860.

A statue of Todd was erected in the great hall of King's College Hospital.

== Legacy ==
Todd was the first to lay down definite principles for the treatment of serious cases of fever. In his Lumleian lectures, he discussed the nature and treatment of various forms of delirium, showed the significant role that exhaustion played in patient deterioration, and how bleeding and lowering remedies contributed to deterioration, while supporting treatment was followed by relief.

Todd was a prolific contributor to medical publications, including The Cyclopaedia of Anatomy and Physiology. He immediately integrated newly available technology, particularly the microscope, into the study and practice of medicine, and was a driving force in raising the standards of medical knowledge.

Todd is remembered for his prescription of a hot drink of brandy, canella (white cinnamon), sugar syrup and water. This is similar to a Hot toddy.

== Partial bibliography ==
Among Todd's publications were

- The Cyclopaedia of Anatomy and Physiology (1835–1859, with other notables)
- Gulstonian Lectures on the Physiology of the Stomach (1839)
- Physiological Anatomy and Physiology of Man (1843–1856, with W. Bowman) — this was among the first works in which histology played an important role (Philadelphia 1857 edition)
- Practical Remarks on Gout, Rheumatic Fever, and Chronic Rheumatism of the Joints (1843) (Croonian Lecture 1843)
- Description and Physiological Anatomy of the Brain, Spinal Cord, and Ganglions (1845)
- Lumleian Lectures on the Pathology and Treatment of Delirium and Coma (1850)
- Clinical Lectures (1854–1857–1859, in three volumes)
- Contributions to the Transactions of the Royal Medical and Chirurgical Society from 1833 through 1859 ('chirurgical' is an obsolete term meaning 'surgical')
- Ten articles in the Cyclopaedia of Medicine from 1833 to 1835, including discussions of paralysis, pseudo-morbid appearances, suppuration, and diseases of the spinal marrow

== Citations ==
- McIntyre, Neil (February 2008). "Robert Bentley Todd (1809–60)". Journal of Medical Biography. 16 (1): 2. doi:10.1258/jmb.2005.005068. PMID 18463057. S2CID 46470032.
- Reynolds, E H (December 2005). "Vis attractiva and vis nervosa". J. Neurol. Neurosurg. Psychiatry. 76 (12): 1711–2. doi:10.1136/jnnp.2005.073858. PMC 1739457. PMID 16291899.
- Todd, Robert Bentley (July 2005). "The Lumleian Lectures for 1849. On the pathology and treatment of convulsive diseases". Epilepsia. 46 (7): 995–1009. doi:10.1111/j.1528-1167.2005.10205.x. PMID 16026551.
- Reynolds, Edward H (July 2005). "Robert Bentley Todd's electrical theory of epilepsy". Epilepsia. 46 (7): 991–4. doi:10.1111/j.1528-1167.2005.11205.x. PMID 16026550.
- Reynolds, Edward H (September 2004). "Todd, Faraday, and the electrical basis of brain activity". Lancet Neurology. 3 (9): 557–63. doi:10.1016/S1474-4422(04)00842-7. PMID 15324724. S2CID 6134087.
- Reynolds, Edward H (August 2004). "Todd, Faraday, and the electrical basis of epilepsy". Epilepsia. 45 (8): 985–92. doi:10.1111/j.0013-9580.2004.12004.x. PMID 15270768.
- Binder, Devin K (February 2004). "A history of Todd and his paralysis". Neurosurgery. 54 (2): 480–6, discussion 486–7. doi:10.1227/01.NEU.0000103490.49537.37. PMID 14744294. S2CID 42890101.
- Lyons, J B (April 1998). "Some contributions of Robert Bentley Todd". Journal of the History of the Neurosciences. 7 (1): 11–26. doi:10.1076/jhin.7.1.11.13098. PMID 11620236.
- Reynolds, E (August 2001). "Todd, Hughlings Jackson, and the electrical basis of epilepsy". Lancet. 358 (9281): 575–7. doi:10.1016/S0140-6736(01)05710-5. PMID 11520547. S2CID 10244765.
- Pearce, J.M.S. (March 1994). "Robert Bentley Todd (1809–60) and locomotor ataxia". J. Neurol. Neurosurg. Psychiatry. 57 (3): 359. doi:10.1136/jnnp.57.3.359. PMC 1072829. PMID 8158187.
- Pearce, J M (March 1994). "Robert Bentley Todd (1809–60) and Todd's paralysis". J. Neurol. Neurosurg. Psychiatry. 57 (3): 315. doi:10.1136/jnnp.57.3.315. PMC 1072820. PMID 8158178.
- Helmstadter, C (1993). "Robert Bentley Todd, Saint John's House, and the origins of the modern trained nurse". Bulletin of the History of Medicine. 67 (2): 282–319. PMID 8329858.
- Goldblatt, D (September 1986). "The great names of our profession. Robert Bentley Todd (1809–1860)". Seminars in Neurology. 6 (3): 332–5. doi:10.1055/s-2008-1041478. PMID 3332438.
