= Christine Burrows =

British academic administrator

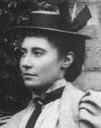
- Christine Burrows, from an 1894 source.

Principal of St Hilda's College, Oxford
- In office 1910–1919
- Preceded by: Esther Elizabeth Burrows
- Succeeded by: Winifred Moberly

Principal of Society of Oxford Home-Students
- In office 1921–1929
- Preceded by: Bertha Johnson
- Succeeded by: Grace Eleanor Hadow

Personal details
- Born: Christine Mary Elizabeth Burrows; 4 January 1872 Chipping Norton, Oxfordshire
- Died: 10 September 1959 (aged 87) Oxford
- Education: Cheltenham Ladies' College
- Alma mater: Lady Margaret Hall, Oxford; St Hilda's College, Oxford

Christine Mary Elizabeth Burrows (4 January 1872 – 10 September 1959) was a British academic administrator who the second Principal of St Hilda's College, Oxford, from 1910 to 1919 and the second Principal of St Anne's College, Oxford, from 1921 to 1929.

== Early life ==
She was born in Chipping Norton, Oxfordshire on 4 January 1872 and educated at Cheltenham Ladies' College. The daughter of Esther Elizabeth Burrows and Joseph Henry Parker Burrows; her father, a businessman, died before she was born and her mother was the first principal of St Hilda's.

Burrows began studying history at Lady Margaret Hall, Oxford in 1891 and was a contemporary of Eleanor Lodge and Barbara Hammond (née Bradby). She had to postpone her studies when her mother took up her role at St Hilda's College, Oxford in 1893. She continued her studies at St Hilda's and completed her exams in 1894. As women students could not earn degrees from Oxford at the time, she did not receive her MA until 1921.

== Career ==
Burrows became a History tutor at St Hilda's in 1894 and Vice Principal in 1895. She succeeded her mother as Principal in 1910 but resigned from the position in 1919 to care for her ailing mother. Notable students at St Hilda's under Burrows's headship include writers Cecil Woodham-Smith (then Cecil Blanche Fitzgerald) and Daisy Lucie Hobman (née Adler).

In 1920, she and five others represented the British Federation of University Women at the International Federation of University Women meeting in London.

In 1921, she became Principal of the Society of Oxford Home-Students (now St Anne's College, Oxford) as she could continue her caring duties alongside the role while living at home.

In 1926, she served as principal of an Oxford summer course for over 200 American women students. In 1929, she again resigned her position to care for her mother, who died in 1935.

In her retirement, Burrows served on a committee of the Church of England on the place of women in the church and wrote a history of St. Hilda's College.

== Death ==
Burrows died at St Luke's Home, Linton Road, Oxford, on 10 September 1959. Following a funeral at St Giles' Church, Oxford, her body was cremated.

Academic offices
Preceded by Esther Elizabeth Burrows	Principal of St Hilda's College, Oxford; 1910—1919	Succeeded by Winifred Moberly
Preceded by Bertha Johnson	Principal of St Anne's College, Oxford; 1921—1929	Succeeded by Grace Eleanor Hadow
