= St Philip's Hospital, Sheffield Street =

St Philip's Hospital
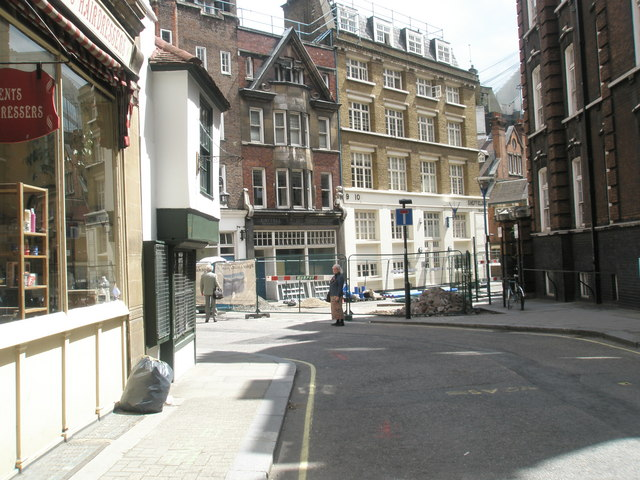
- St Philip's Hospital (on the right)

- Location within Westminster

Geography
- Location: Sheffield Street, London, England, United Kingdom
- Coordinates: 51.5148°N 0.1176°W

History
- Founded: 1920
- Closed: 1992

Links
- Lists: Hospitals in England

St Philip's Hospital was a medical facility on Sheffield Street in London, originally formed on the site of the Bear Yard Infirmary.

== History ==
St Philip's hospital began on the site of what was originally the Bear Yard Workhouse Infirmary, part of the Bear Yard Workhouse and Casual Wards. The Bear Yard Workhouse and Casual Wards were built in 1890, with the buildings (excluding the infirmary, which was still active in 1901) being demolished in 1900 and replaced by the Strand Union in 1903. In 1913, the Strand Union amalgamated with the St George's Union and Westminster Union respectively to become the City of Westminster Poor Union. During WWI, the site of the workhouse infirmary was used as an observation hospital for war refugees.

In 1919, the site of the Sheffield Street workhouse was sold to the Metropolitan Asylums Board for £20,000 following an approach to the Ministry of Health by the Home Secretary at the time, Edward Shortt, in order to provide accommodation for the reception and treatment of women suffering from venereal disease (VD), and it was opened for this purpose in 1920.

In 1930, the hospital came under the control of the London County Council and was expanded, with additional wards being built in the southern block known as Sheffield House, now being able to accommodate 52 patients. At this point it was renamed as the Sheffield Street Hospital. In 1948 it joined the newly formed National Health Service, at which point it came under the control of the Paddington Group Hospital Management Committee.

The introduction and mass-manufacture of penicillin in 1945 led to a reduced requirement for VD hospitals. At some point during 1951 the hospital was renamed to St Philips Hospital and in 1952 joined the Institute of Urology (formed by St Peter's Hospital and St Paul's Hospital). These three hospitals became known as "the three P's", with St Philip's focusing on chronic urological cases, At this point the inpatient capacity was of 57 beds.

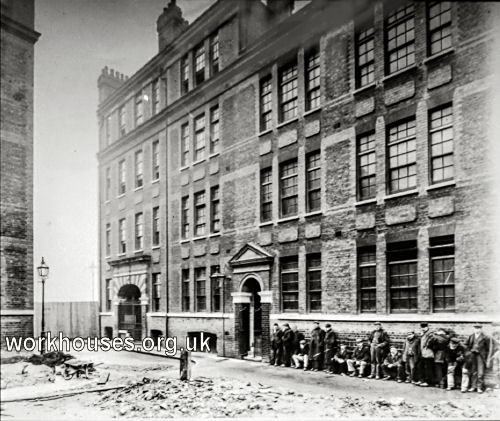
Bear Yard Receiving Workhouse and Casual Wards c1900

At some point following 1952 the hospital focused on nephrology and by 1969 had reduced to a capacity of 26 beds. In 1992 the Institute of Urology closed, with all urological services being transferred to the Middlesex Hospital.

Following this closure, the hospital building was taken over by the London School of Economics sometime between 1992 and 2008. The School performed two studies in 2008 and in 2010 announced their plans to demolish the building and replace it with a seven storey student union building with an initial cost of £21.5 million. In 2013 the construction of the Saw Swee Hock Student Centre was completed at a cost of £24.1 million, and it was opened in 2014. The building was named after Saw Swee Hock, a former student of the London School of Economics who received his PhD in statistics in 1963.
