= Armstrong Todd =

Surgeon (b. 1826, d. 1873)

Armstrong Todd (1826–1873) was a nineteenth-century London surgeon credited with researching new medical conditions and procedures, including anaesthetics.

== Early life ==
The son of physician and president of the Royal College of Surgeons in Ireland (RCSI) Charles Hawkes Todd (1784–1826) and Elizabeth Bentley (1786–1862), Armstrong was born on 1826 in Dublin, Ireland; the year his father died. He was the youngest of fifteen children and the brother of James Henthorn Todd, Robert Bentley Todd, and William Gowan Todd.

By 1848, he earned a B.A. and M.B. from Trinity College in Dublin, Ireland. One year later, he passed his medical exams, and he became a member of the Royal College of Surgeons (M.R.C.S.).

In 1852, Armstrong married Frances Alicia Kinahan (1824–1909). She was the daughter of Robert Henry Kinahan (1799–1861) and Charlotte Hudson (1800–1842). In 1853, Robert Henry Kinahan became Lord Mayor of Dublin after serving as sheriff and alderman.

== Professional life ==
Armstrong Todd started his medical career in Manchester, England as a consulting surgeon to Ardwick and Ancoats Dispensary and London Mutual Life Guarantee Society. He was a member of the Paris Medical Society, British Medical Association, Medical Society of London.

The 1850s saw the first widespread use of chloroform during surgery. Chloroform began to replace ether as an anaesthetic. Todd became aware of chloroform's toxicity and dangers. He published and contributed to several articles about its safe administration in The Medical Times and Gazette.

By 1860, Todd had moved to 16 Burlington Street, London, to become a surgeon at Marylebone Dispensary. His home and office were located near two of his older brothers. Robert Bentley Todd was living and working as a physician in London's Grosvenor Square area. William Gowan Todd was living and working as a pastor in the Blackheath area.

In 1860, Armstrong Todd was involved in founding a speciality hospital for "the treatment of patients labouring under Stone and other diseases of the urinary organs." That hospital was originally known as The Hospital for Stone. It subsequently became known as St Peter's Hospital, which, in 1948, joined St Paul's Hospital to form London's Institute of Urology.

== Personal life ==
Armstrong Todd and Frances Alicia Kinahan Todd had two sons and five daughters. Both sons were medical practitioners. Their first son, Robert Henry Todd, was a medical doctor and lawyer. He became a coroner for the City of Sydney, New South Wales, Australia. The second son, Armstrong Herbert Swifte Todd, became a surgeon in County Fermanagh, Ireland.

At the age of 44, it appears Todd became severely ill. The nature of his illness is presently unknown. Medical directories suggest he retired from medical practice before 1870. On 20 May 1873, he was admitted to Camberwell House Asylum in Surrey, England as patient 26389. He died there several days later, on 3 June 1873, at the age of 47 years. He is buried at Norwood Cemetery in Lambeth, England. After his death, Frances Alicia Kinahan Todd returned to Dublin, Ireland.

The children of Armstrong Todd and Francis were:

- Charlotte Emily Todd (1853–1909) married Albert Edward Croly, MD and died in Dublin, Ireland
- Francis Caroline Hawkes Todd (1854–1901) unmarried and died in Surrey, England
- Anna Julia Todd (1856–1934) unmarried and died in Surrey, England
- Alicia Maria Todd (1857–1927) unmarried and died in Surrey, England
- Robert Henry Todd, MD, JD (1859–1931) married Ellen Joy Orr and died in Sydney, Australia
- Caroline Stanley Edwards Todd (1863–1940) married Edward Arnold, lived in County Tyrone, Ireland, and died in England.
- Armstrong Herbert Swift Todd, MD (1865–1936) married Georgina Matthews and died in County Fermanagh, Northern Ireland.

== Partial bibliography ==
Among Todd's publications were:

- “On Cases in which the administration of Chloroform may prove Injurious,” Med. Times and Gaz
- “Administration of Chloroform, with a Description of a New Inhaler,” Med Times Gaz
- “Administration of Medical Charities, with Suggestions for a more Systematized Plan of Management”
- “Stricture of the Rectum, with Description of a New Dilator”
- “Stone in the Bladder, with Cases of Lithotomy”
