= Esther Elizabeth Burrows =

First principal of St Hilda's College, Oxford (1847–1935)

Principal of St Hilda's College, Oxford
- In office 1892–1910
- Preceded by: first incumbent
- Succeeded by: Christine Burrows

Personal details
- Born: Esther Elizabeth Bliss; 18 October 1847 Chipping Norton, Oxfordshire
- Died: 20 February 1935 (aged 87) Oxford
- Resting place: St Luke's Church, Maidenhead
- Spouse: Henry Parker Burrows (m. 1870; died 1871)
- Children: Christine Burrows

Esther Elizabeth Burrows (née Bliss, 18 October 1847 – 20 February 1935) was a British academic administrator, the first principal of St Hilda's College, Oxford, from 1892 to 1910.

She was born Esther Elizabeth Bliss on 18 October 1847 in Chipping Norton, Oxfordshire, the third child and second daughter of William Bliss (1810–1883), a cloth manufacturer in the town, and his wife, Esther Cleaver (1808–1882), the daughter of Robert Cleaver of Saffron Walden, Essex.

In 1892, Dorothea Beale, the principal of Cheltenham Ladies' College, offered Burrows the post of principal of St Hilda's, a college for women which she was starting in Oxford. She held the post until she retired in 1910.

On 8 September 1870, in Chipping Norton, she married Henry Parker Burrows (1833-1871), a partner in a Maidenhead firm of wine merchants and brewers, and they had a daughter. She was succeeded as principal by her daughter, Christine Burrows.

Burrows died on 20 February 1935 at her home, 47 Woodstock Road, Oxford, following a stroke, and was buried at St Luke's, Maidenhead.

Academic offices
Preceded by First in post	Principal of St Hilda's College, Oxford; 1893—1910	Succeeded by Christine Burrows
