= St Hilda's College, Oxford =

College of the University of Oxford

St Hilda's College
- University of Oxford
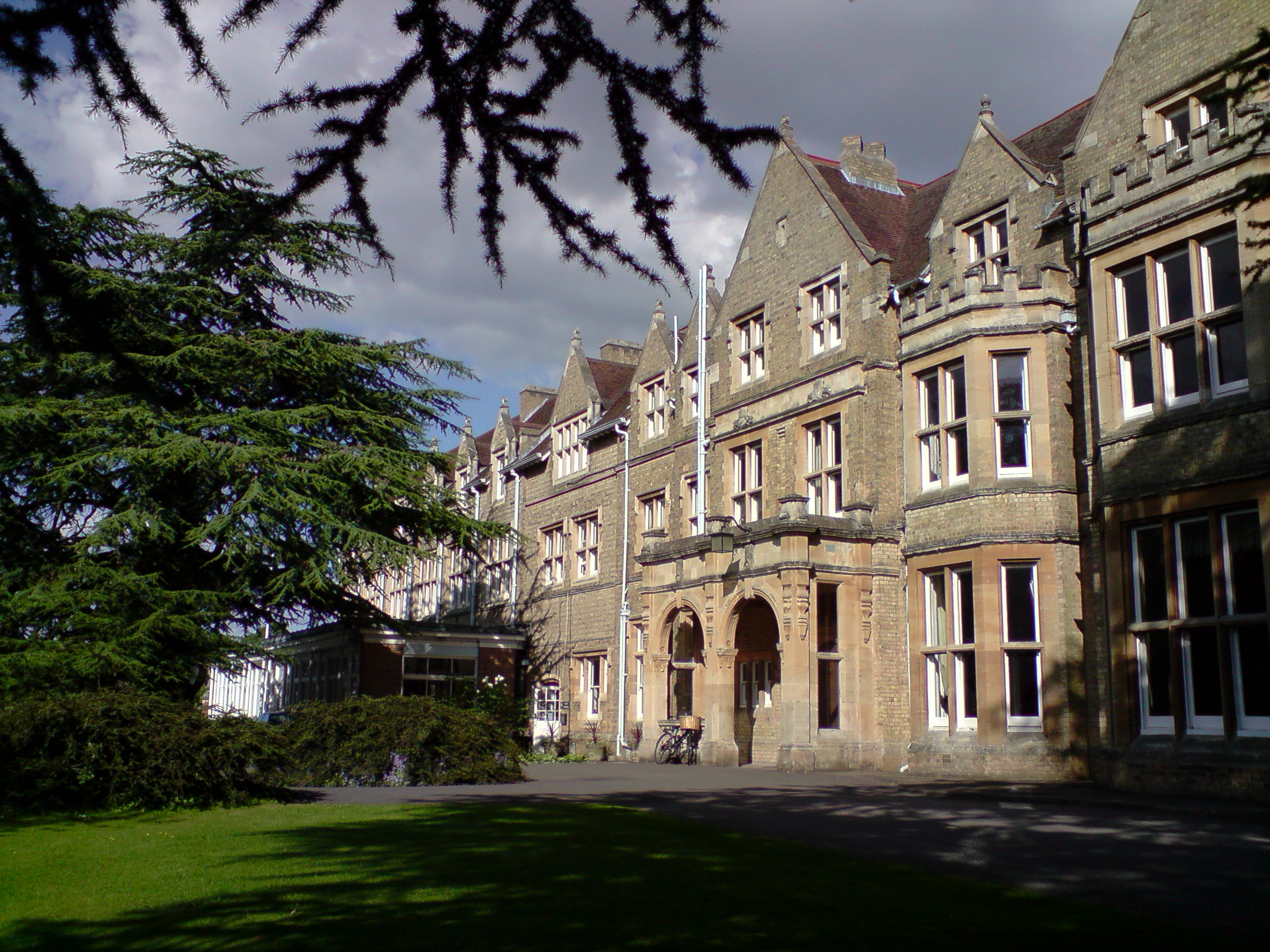
- South Building

- Arms: Azure, on a fess or three estoiles gules in chief two unicorns' heads couped, in base a coiled serpent argent.
- Location: Cowley Place
- Coordinates: 51.749162°N 1.245334°W
- Latin name: Collegium Sanctae Hildae
- Motto: Non frustra vixi (I lived not in vain)
- Established: 1893; 133 years ago
- Named for: Hilda of Whitby
- Principal: Sarah Springman
- Undergraduates: 420 (2024–25)
- Postgraduates: 290 (2024–25)
- Endowment: £56.6 million (2020)
- Website: www.st-hildas.ox.ac.uk
- Boat club: St Hilda's College Boat Club

Map
- Location within Oxford city centre

St Hilda's College is a constituent college of the University of Oxford in England. The college is named after the Anglo-Saxon saint Hilda of Whitby and was founded in 1893 as a hall for women; it remained a women's college until 2008. St Hilda's was the last single-sex college in the university as Somerville College had admitted men in 1994. St Hilda's has almost equal numbers of men and women at both undergraduate and postgraduate level.

The principal of the college is Sarah Springman, who took office in 2022.

As of 2020, the college had an endowment of £56.6 million and total assets of £119.7 million.

== History ==
St Hilda's was founded by Dorothea Beale (who was also a headmistress at Cheltenham Ladies' College) in 1893, as St Hilda's Hall and recognised by the Association for the Education of Women as a women's hall in 1896. It was founded as a women's college, a status it retained until 2008. Whilst other Oxford colleges gradually became co-educational, no serious debate at St Hilda's occurred until 1997, according to a former vice-principal, and then the debate solely applied to the issue of staff appointments. After a vote on 7 June 2006 by the Governing Body, men and women can be admitted as fellows and students. This vote was pushed through with a narrow margin and followed previous unsuccessful votes. This led to protests from students because of the "high-handed" manner in which they were held.

In October 2007, a supplemental charter was granted and in 2008 male students were admitted to St Hilda's for the first time. The college now has almost equal numbers of men and women at both undergraduate and postgraduate level. In August 2018, the interim Norrington Table showed that 98 per cent of St Hilda's finalist undergraduates obtained at least a 2.i in their degree.

=== Women's rowing ===
St Hilda's was the first women's college in Oxford and Cambridge to create a women's VIII in 1911. It was St Hilda's student H.G. Wanklyn who formed OUWBC and coxed in the inaugural Women's Boat Race of 1927, with five Hilda's rowers. In 1969, the St Hilda's Eight made Oxford history when they became the first ever female crew to row in the Summer Eights. They placed 12th.

=== Documentary ===
St Hilda's students were the subject of the Channel 4 documentary series College Girls, broadcast in 2002.

== Buildings and grounds ==
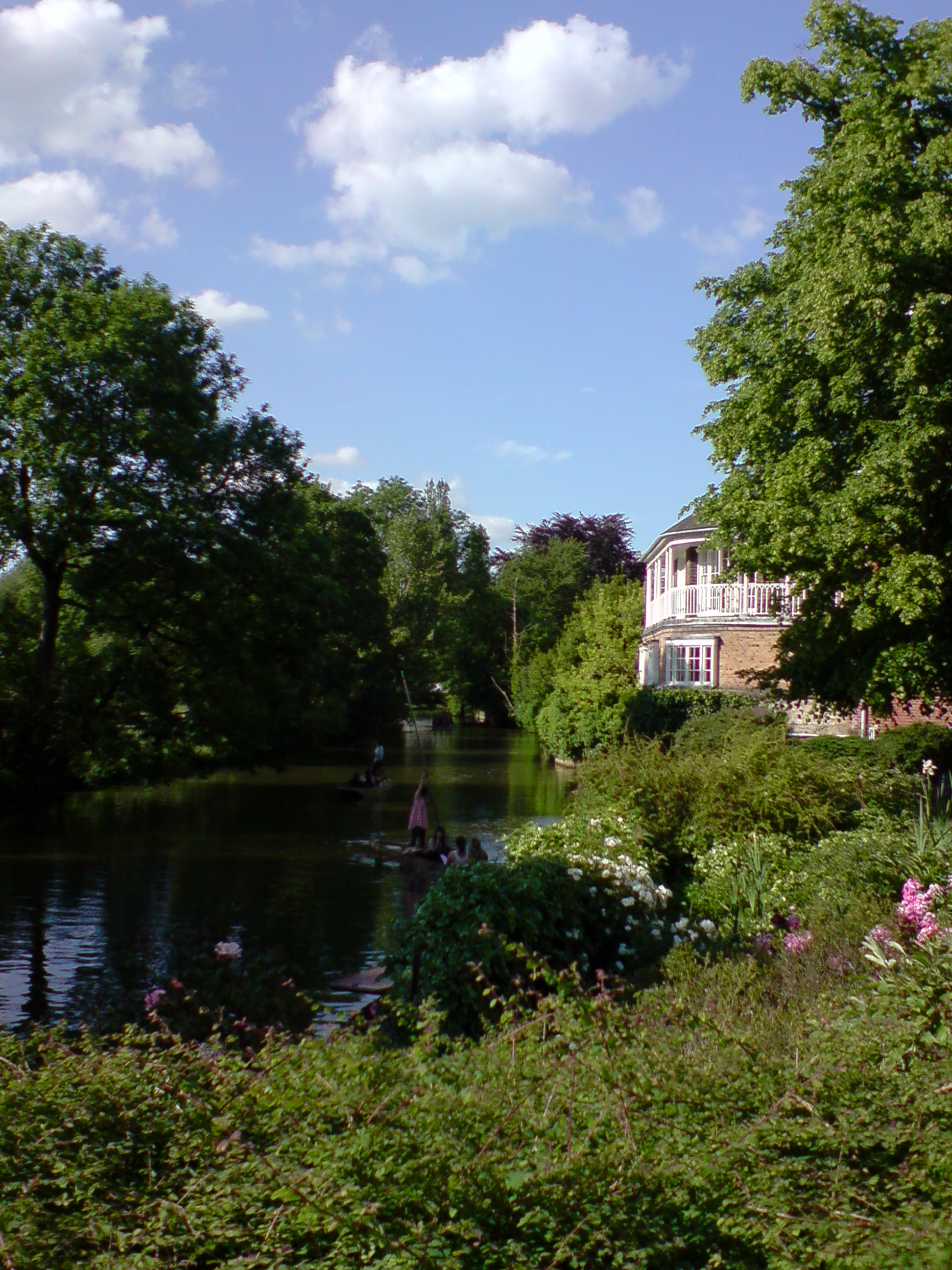
Milham Ford Building by the River Cherwell

The college is located at the eastern end of the High Street, Oxford, over Magdalen Bridge, in Cowley Place, making it the only University of Oxford college lying east of the River Cherwell. It is the most conveniently situated Oxford college for the Iffley Road Sports Complex, a focus for Oxford University Sport.

=== Buildings ===
Its grounds include six major buildings, which contain student accommodation, teaching areas, dining hall, the library and administration blocks. The first building occupied by the hall was Cowley House built by Humphrey Sibthorp. Together with later extensions it is now known as Hall. In 1921 the hall acquired the lease of Cherwell Hall, now known as South, which was originally Cowley Grange, a house built by A. G. Vernon Harcourt. The lease of Milham Ford, a former school between Hall and South, was acquired in 1958. More recent additions are Wolfson (opened in 1964), Garden (by Alison and Peter Smithson, opened in 1971), and the Christina Barratt Building (opened in 2001). In autumn 2020, a new Boundary Building replaced some of the older buildings, while Milham Ford, which was demolished in 2018, was replaced by a new riverside "Pavilion". The college also owns a number of properties on Iffley Road, and in the Cowley area.

=== The Jacqueline du Pré Music Building ===
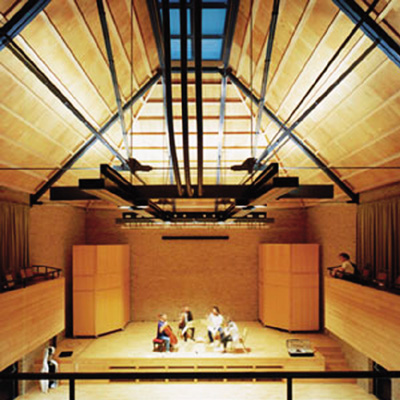
The Jacqueline du Pré Music Building

The Jacqueline du Pré Music Building (JdP) is a concert venue named after the famous cellist who was an honorary fellow of the college. The JdP was the first purpose-built concert hall to be built in Oxford since the Holywell Music Room in 1742. Built in 1995 by van Heyningen and Haward Architects, it houses the Steinway-equipped Edward Boyle Auditorium and a number of music practice rooms. In 2000 the architects designed a new, enlarged foyer space; a lean-to glass structure along the front elevation to the existing music building. In addition to frequent recitals presented by the St Hilda's Music Society, the JdP also hosts concerts by a number of world-renowned performers. Musicians who have performed in the JdP in recent years include Steven Isserlis, the Jerusalem Quartet, the Chilingirian Quartet and the Belcea Quartet. The building has also been used for amateur dramatic performances; since 2008, St Hilda's College Drama Society have been producing several plays a year in the Edward Boyle Auditorium.

=== The Kathleen Major Library ===
The original library was held within Hall Building but was limited in space and offerings. In 1909, a new basement wing was opened, and more resources began to be added to collections. The college's second principal, Christine Mary Elizabeth Burrows, known as Miss Burrows, is credited with compiling the first catalogue for the library; thus, St. Hilda's first library was named for her. The building saw two more expansions and was completed in 1935, though renovations and expansions would continue through to today. The library was renamed in 2005 for Kathleen Major, former librarian and president of the college, and pioneer of the archive profession.

The library currently holds approximately 70,000 books covering all undergraduate subjects. The library offers specialised collections intended for use by research students, including medieval history and literature and women's studies. The library holds the St. Hilda's College Archives in physical and digital formats. Notable items in the archive include letters from the college founder, Dorothea Beale, and other artifacts pertaining to early women's education at the university. The library also holds a rare books collection of approximately 700 items with content ranging from the 15th century to today. Many of the items in the rare books collection were donated by Dorothea Beale. College archives and rare books collections are held in a secure, temperature- and humidity-controlled facility. Other collections offered at the library include popular fiction, culinary books, and travel books.

The library has three floors, seven reading rooms, and 150 study spaces, and has desktop computers as well as a printer, scanner, and photocopier. The main reading room has an art gallery, as well as views of the River Cherwell and the Oxford spires.

=== Grounds ===
The college grounds stretch along the banks of the River Cherwell, with many college rooms overlooking the river and playing fields beyond. The college has its own fleet of punts, which students of the college may use free of charge in summer months. Unfortunately, this location at times led to problems with flooding in the former Milham Ford building.

== People associated with the college ==
=== Principals ===
| Name | Birth | Death | Principal Between | Notes |
|---|---|---|---|---|
| Esther Elizabeth Burrows | 18 October 1847 | 20 February 1935 | 1893–1910 | |
| Christine Mary Elizabeth Burrows | 4 January 1872 | 10 September 1959 | 1910–1919 | |
| Winifred Moberly | 1 April 1875 | 6 April 1928 | 1919–1928 | |
| Julia de Lacy Mann | 22 August 1891 | 23 May 1985 | 1928–1955 | |
| Kathleen Major | 10 April 1906 | 19 December 2000 | 1955–1965 | |
| Mary Bennett | 9 January 1913 | 1 November 2005 | 1965–1980 | |
| Mary Moore | 8 April 1930 | 6 October 2017 | 1980–1990 | |
| Elizabeth Llewellyn-Smith | 17 August 1934 | | 1990–2001 | |
| Judith English | 1 March 1940 | | 2001–2007 | |
| Sheila Forbes | 31 December 1946 | | 2007–2014 | |
| Gordon Duff | 27 December 1947 | | 2014–2021 | |
| Georgina Paul (acting) | | | 2021–2022 | |
| Sarah Springman | 26 December 1956 | | 2022–date | |

=== Former students ===
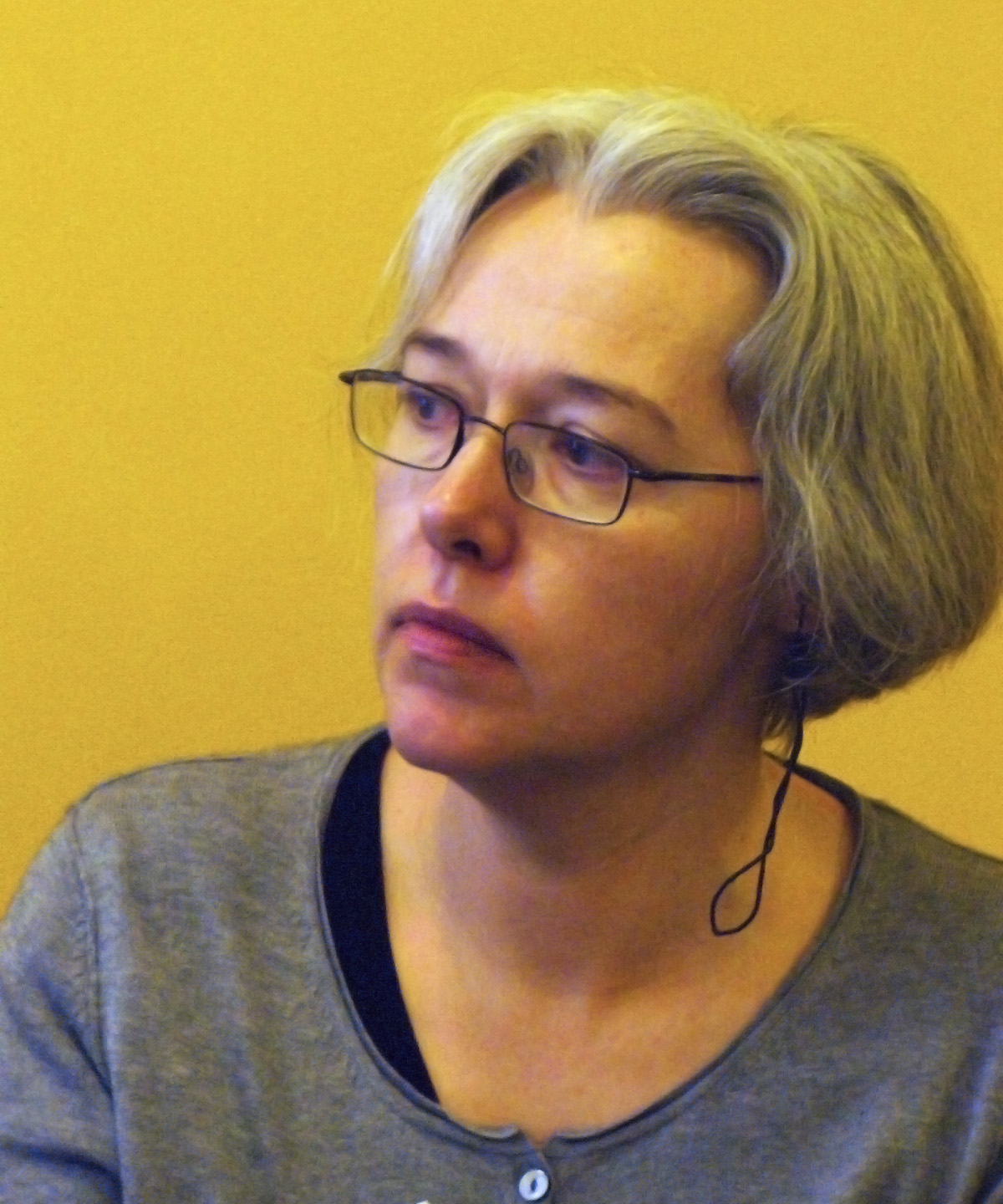
Susanna Clarke, author

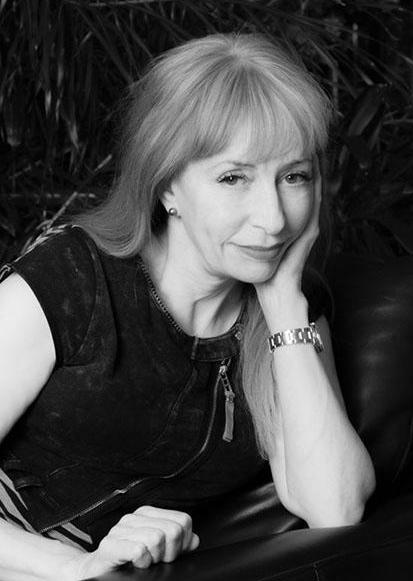
Susan Greenfield, Baroness Greenfield

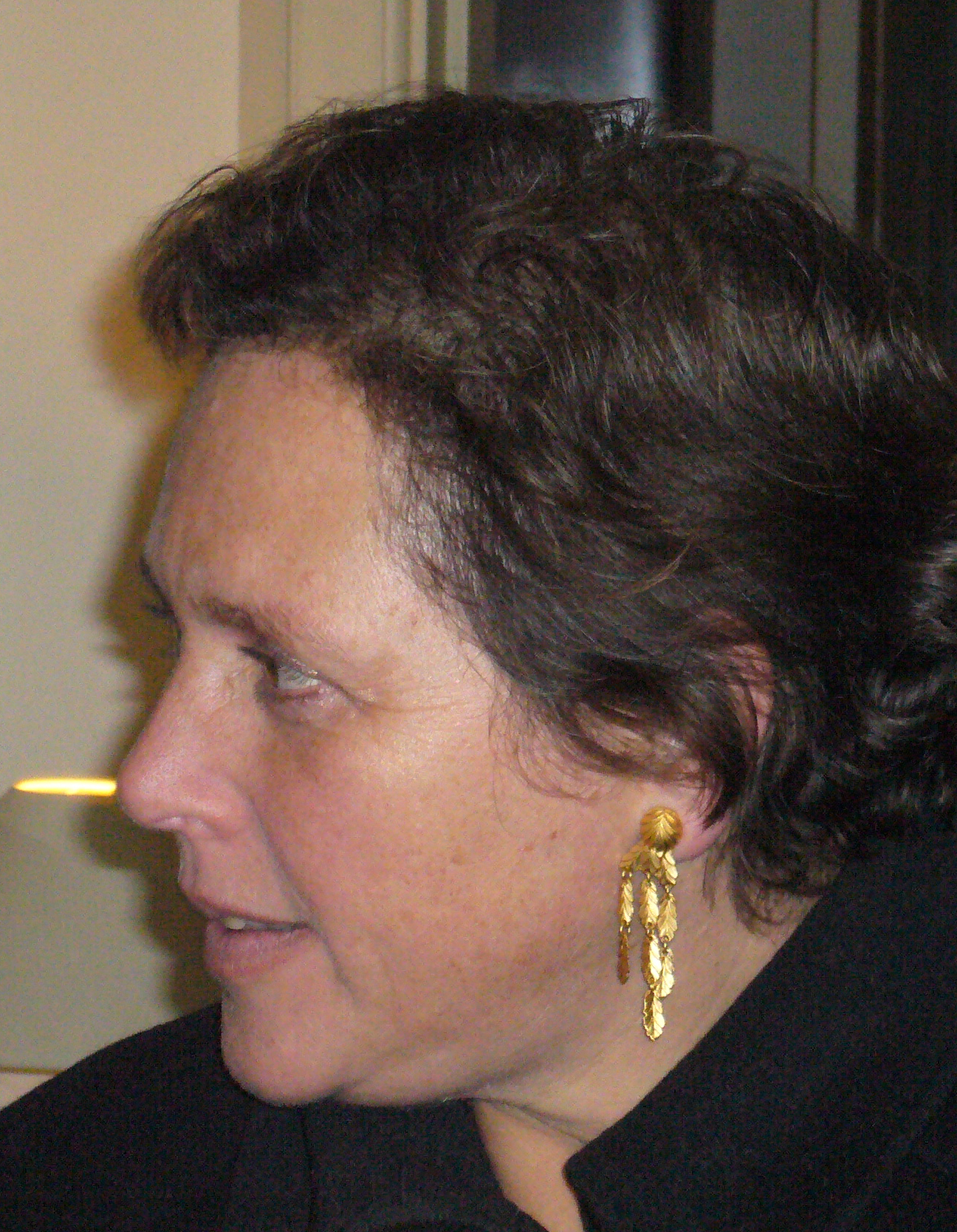
Susan Kramer, Liberal Democrat politician

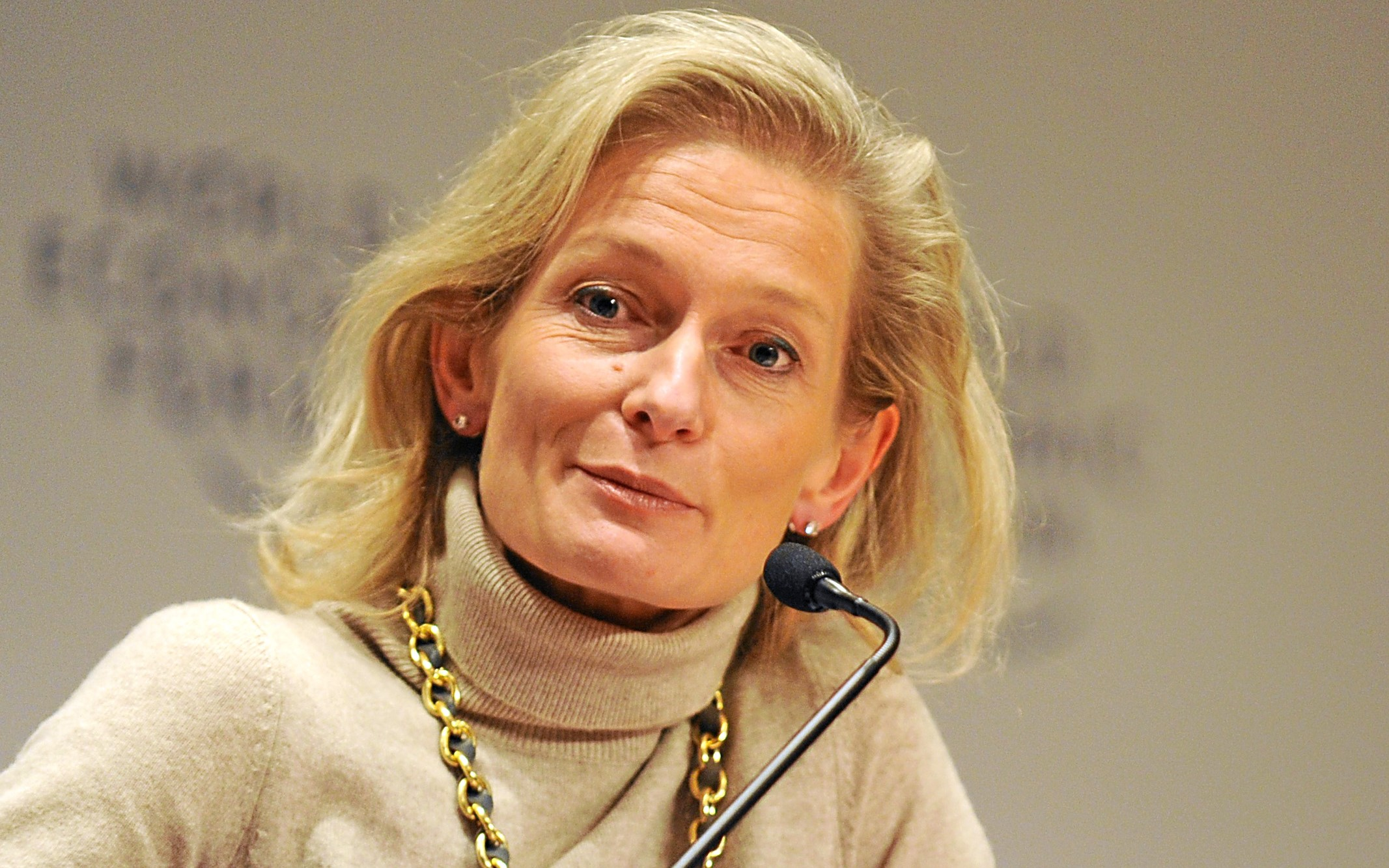
Zanny Minton Beddoes, editor of The Economist

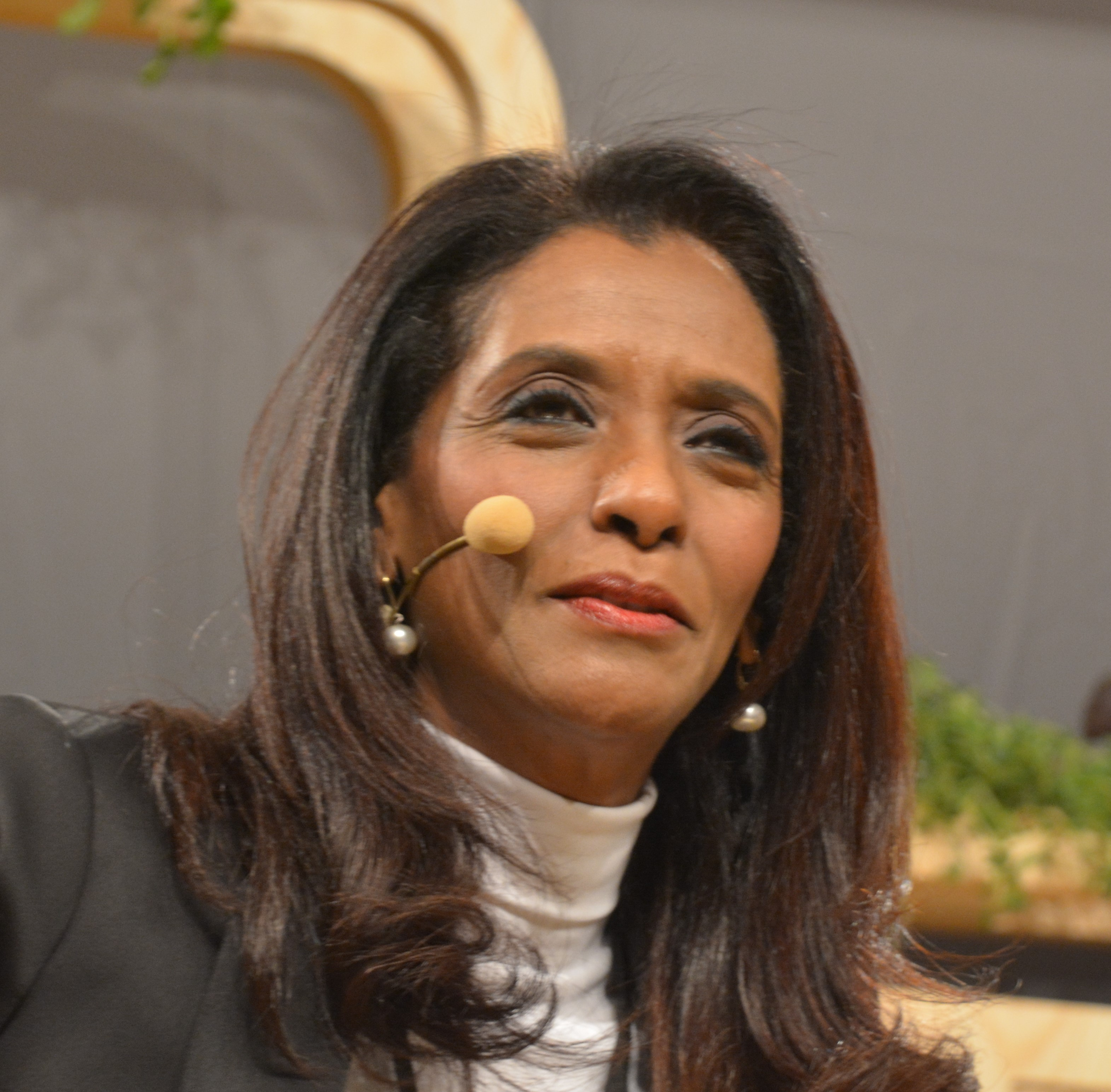
Zeinab Badawi, BBC journalist
- Gaynor Arnold, novelist
- Elizabeth Aston, author
- Maudy Ayunda, Indonesian singer-songwriter and actress
- Zeinab Badawi, BBC journalist
- Kate Barker, economist
- Sarah Baxter, journalist
- Zanny Minton Beddoes, editor of The Economist
- Princess Haya Bint Al Hussein, royalty
- Susan Blackmore, parapsychologist, writer and broadcaster
- Julia Briggs, academic, literary critic and biographer
- D. K. Broster, historical novelist
- Mikita Brottman, author, psychoanalyst
- Marilyn Butler, Lady Butler, academic
- Fiona Caldicott, psychiatrist, academic, chair of the Caldicott Report Committee
- Susanna Clarke, author
- Lisa Cook, economist
- Wendy Cope, poet
- Lettice Curtis, aviator
- Miriam Defensor Santiago, Philippine senator, Ramon Magsaysay Awardee
- Violet Mary Doudney, militant suffragette
- Daisy Dunn, author and classicist
- Barbara Everett, academic
- Susan Garden, Baroness Garden of Frognal, politician
- Helen Gardner, critic
- Margaret Gelling, toponymist
- Adele Geras, writer
- Christine Gerrard, Principal of Lady Margaret Hall
- Roma Gill, academic and literary scholar
- Christina Gough, cricketer and statistician
- Karina Gould, Canadian minister
- Anna Grear, academic, Law and Theory professor, company founder and director
- Susan Greenfield, Baroness Greenfield, academic
- Susan Gritton, soprano
- Catherine Heath, novelist
- Rosalind Hill, historian
- Meg Hillier, politician
- Victoria Hislop, writer
- Bettany Hughes, historian
- Ruth Hunt, CEO of Stonewall
- Helen Jackson, politician
- Hilda Jennings, author, academic and community activist
- Jenny Joseph, poet
- Susan Kramer, Baroness Kramer, British Liberal Democrat politician
- Angela Lambert, author and journalist
- Hermione Lee, critic and biographer
- Nicola LeFanu, composer
- Elizabeth Levett, historian
- Sue Lloyd-Roberts, Special Correspondent for the BBC (formerly at ITN)
- Margaret MacMillan, historian and Warden of St Antony's College
- Anita Mason, novelist
- Val McDermid, novelist
- Rosalind Miles, writer
- Kate Millett, feminist author
- Anne Mills FRS, health economist
- Brenda Moon, librarian
- Laura Mulvey, feminist film theorist
- Elizabeth Neville, police officer
- Katherine Parkinson, actress
- Rachel Parris, comedian
- Lavender Patten, barrister
- Barbara Pym, novelist
- Pooky Quesnel, actor and screenwriter
- Betty Radice, translator and editor
- Celine Rattray, film producer
- Gillian Rose, philosopher
- Jacqueline Rose, academic and writer
- The Hon. Hannah Rothschild, author, film maker and philanthropist
- Sheila Rowbotham, feminist theorist and historian
- Gillian Shephard, Baroness Shephard of Northwold, politician
- Helen Simpson, short story writer
- Ann Thwaite, biographer
- Tsuda Umeko, educator
- Cecil Woodham-Smith, historian
- Hou Yifan, chess grandmaster and professor

=== Fellows ===
- Mary Bennett
- William Boyd, author
- Gordon Duff
- Helen Gardner
- Angelica Goodden
- Elspeth Kennedy
- Barbara Levick
- Beryl Smalley
- Helen Waddell
- Kathy Wilkes
- Dev Gangjee

=== Honorary fellows ===
- Jacqueline du Pré
- Doris Odlum
- Rosalyn Tureck

== Gallery ==
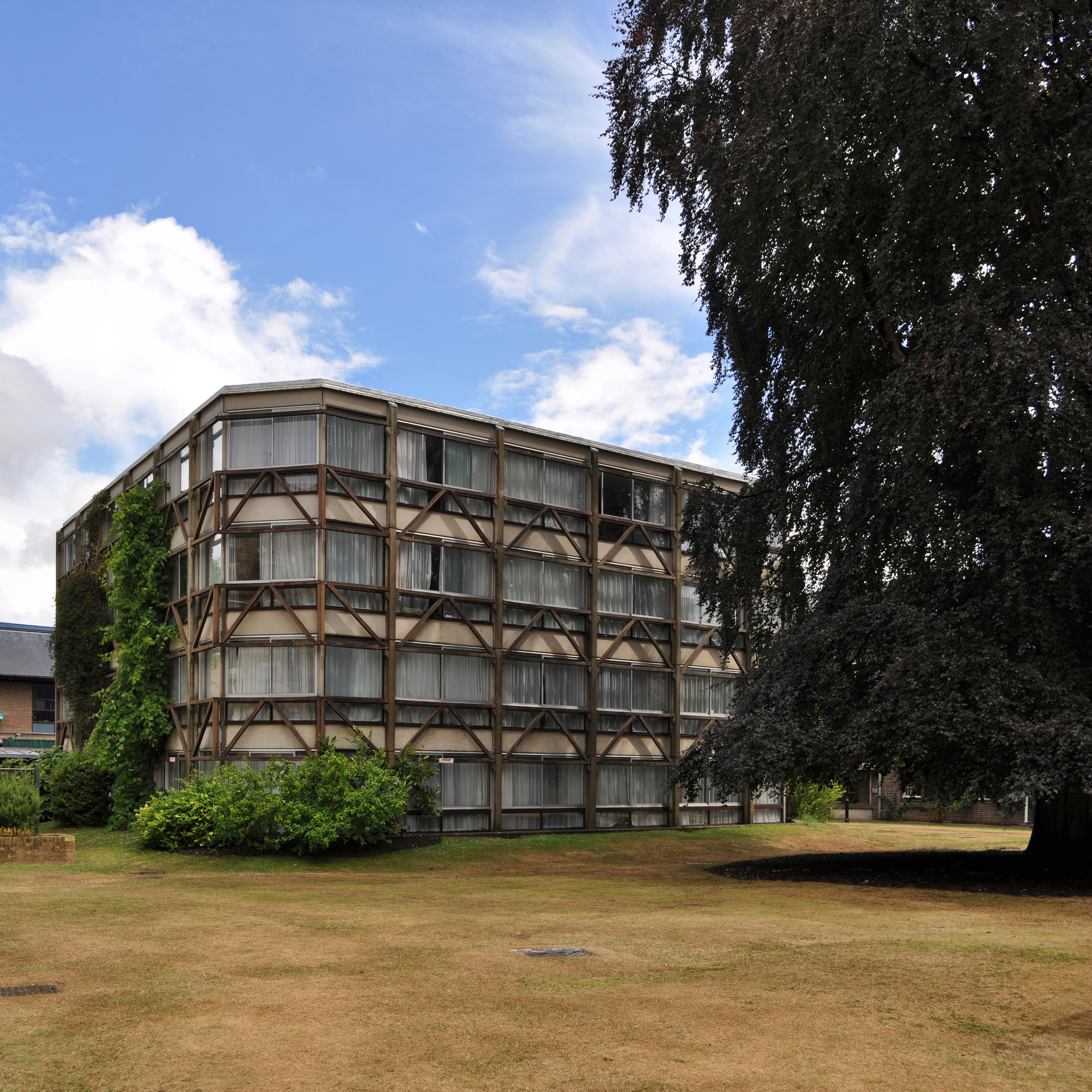
Garden Building

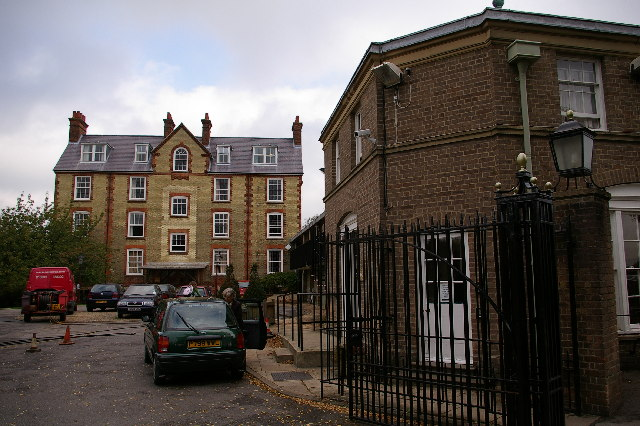
Hall building and Porters' Lodge (now demolished)

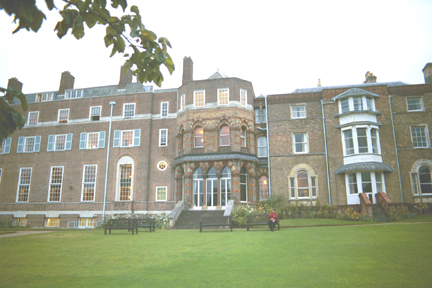
College library

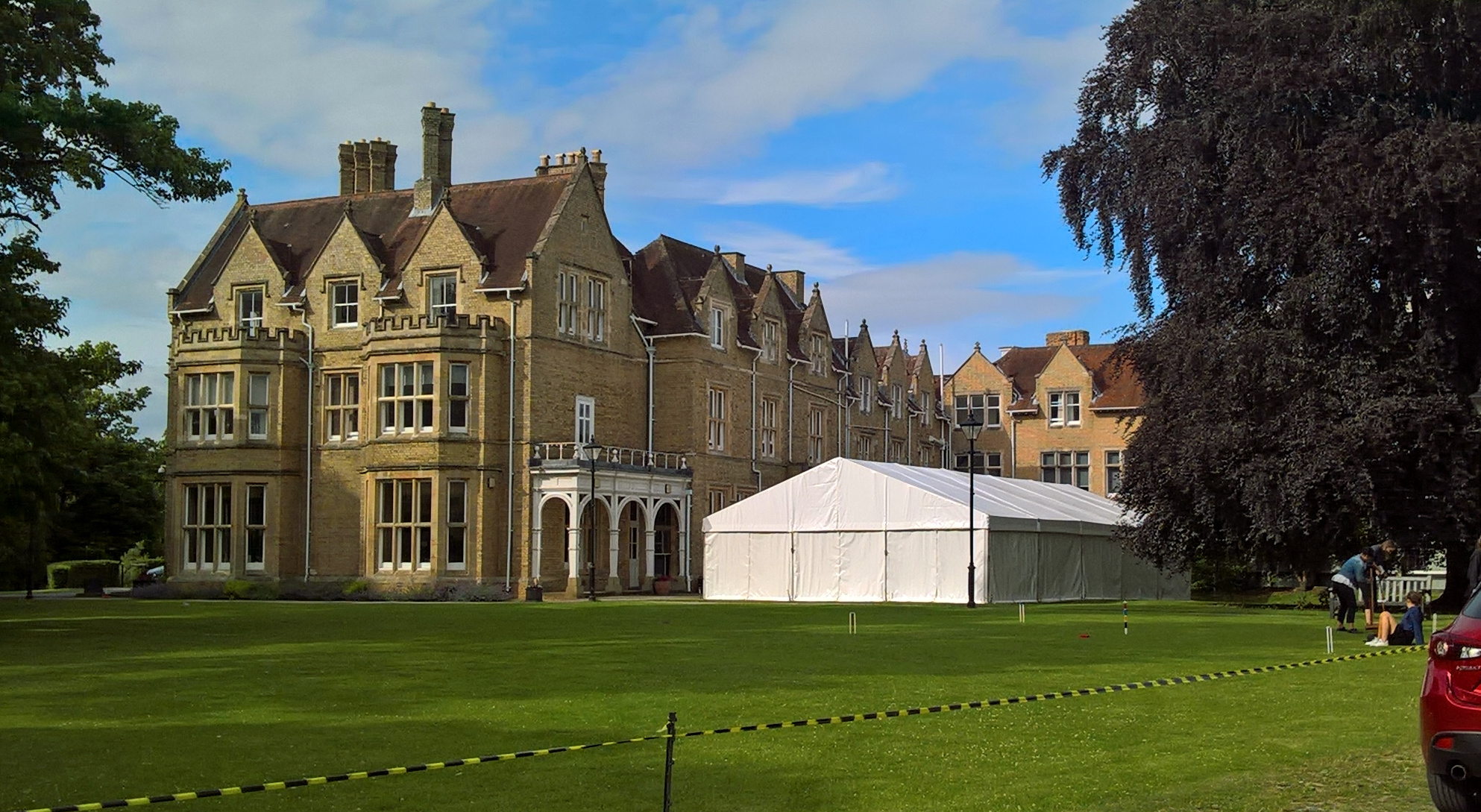
South Building as seen from the croquet lawn

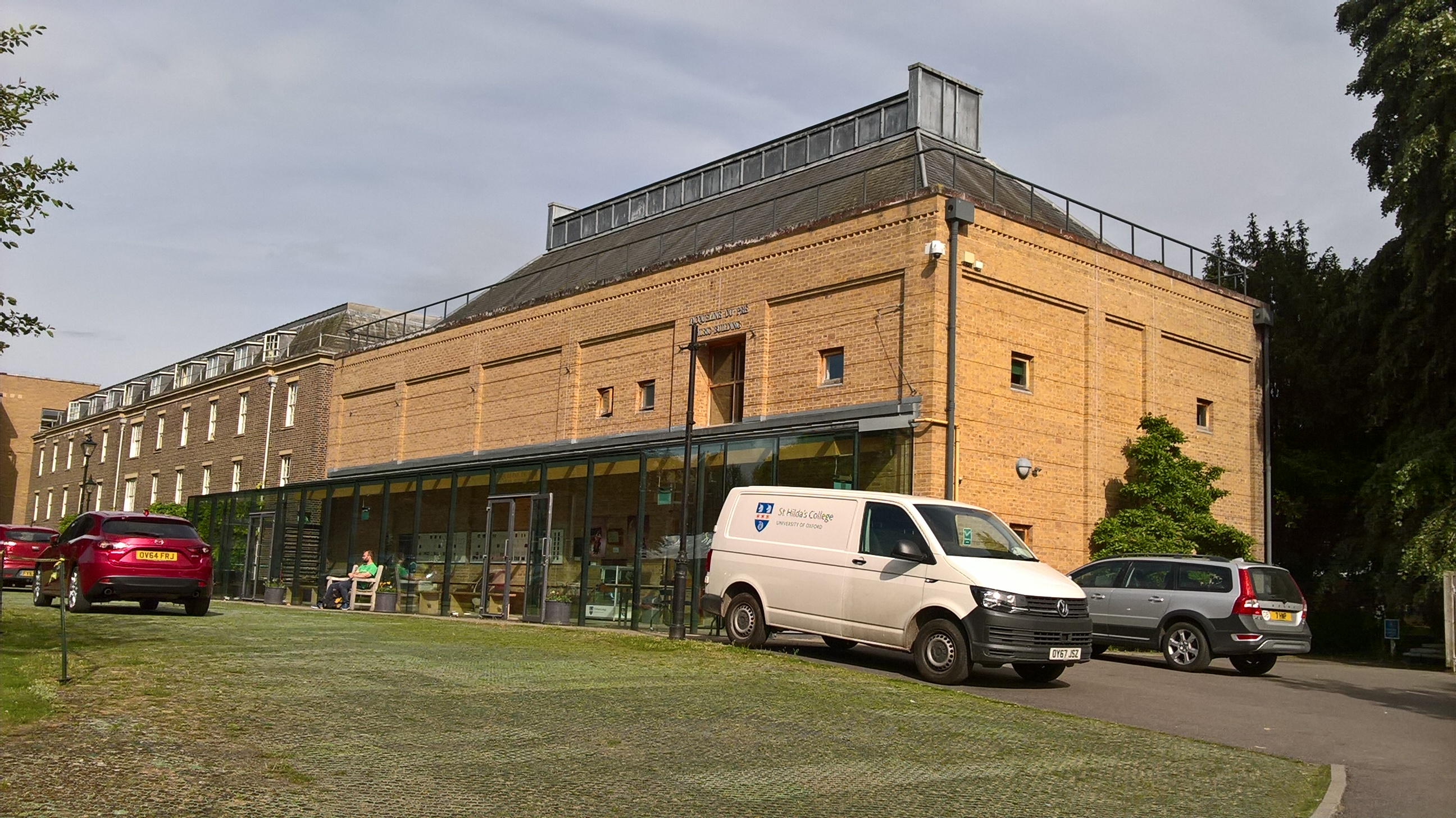
The exterior of the JdP

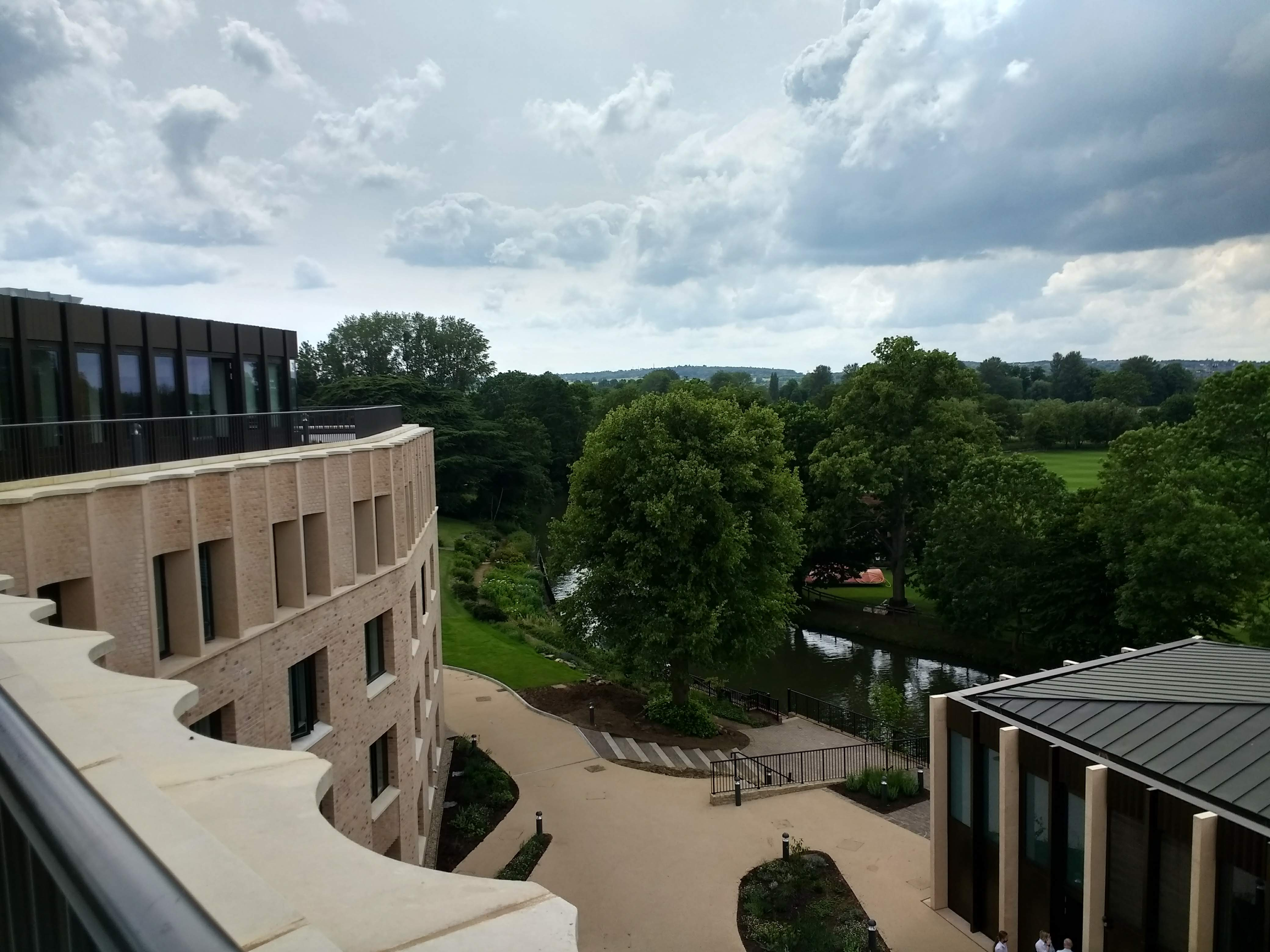
Anniversary building and Pavilion
