= St Paul's Hospital, Endell Street =

St Paul's Hospital
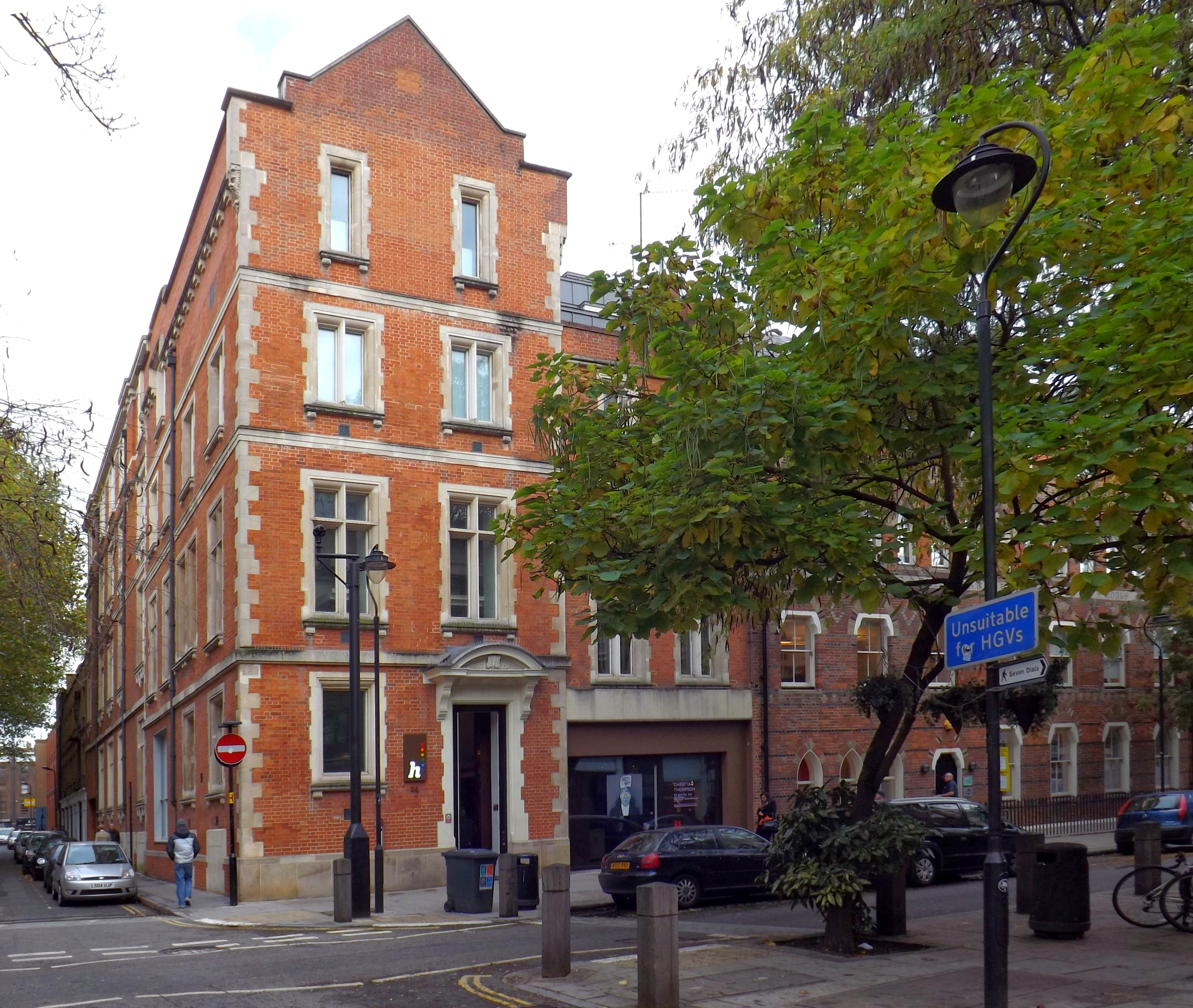
- St Paul's Hospital

- Location within Westminster

Geography
- Location: Endell Street, Holborn, London, England, United Kingdom
- Coordinates: 51.51485°N 0.12479°W

History
- Founded: 1898
- Closed: 1992

Links
- Lists: Hospitals in England

The St Paul's Hospital was a medical facility at Endell Street in London.

== History ==
The hospital, which was established in Red Lion Square as St Paul's Hospital for Skin and Genito-Urinary Diseases, opened in August 1898. It moved to the building in Endell Street, previously occupied by the British Lying-In Hospital, in 1923. It was renamed "St. Paul's Hospital for Diseases (including Cancer) of the Genito-Urinary Organs and Skin" In 1927. It joined the National Health Service in 1948, when it amalgamated with St Peter's Hospital to form the Institute of Urology. The Institute was joined by St Philip's Hospital in 1952 and the hospitals became known as "the three Ps."

After all urology services were transferred to the Middlesex Hospital, St Paul's closed in 1992. The building was later occupied by the Hospital Club.
