= James Henthorn Todd =

Irish biblical scholar, educator and historian (1805–1869)

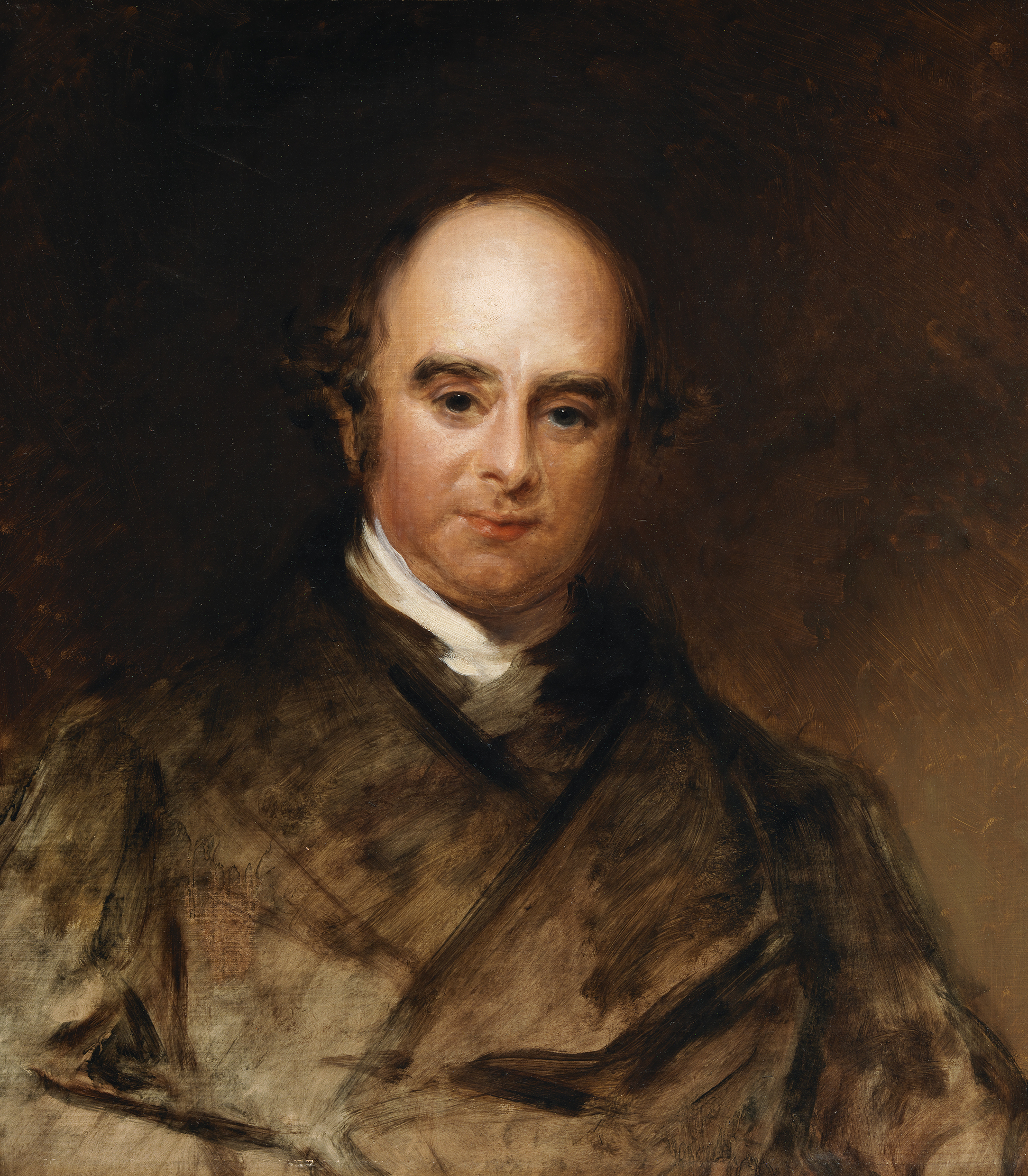
- Born: 23 April 1805; Rathfarnham, Ireland
- Died: 28 June 1869 (aged 64); Rathfarnham, Ireland
- Education: Trinity College, Dublin
- Occupations: Writer; Academic; Historian; Minister
- Relatives: Charles Hawkes Todd (father) Robert Bentley Todd (brother)
- Writing career
- Subjects: liberal Protestantism, Irish history
- Notable works: St. Patrick, Apostle to Ireland; The War of the Gaedhil With the Gaill

James Henthorn Todd (23 April 1805 – 28 June 1869) was a biblical scholar, educator, and Irish historian. He is noted for his efforts to place religious disagreements on a rational historical footing, for his advocacy of a liberal form of Protestantism, and for his endeavors as an educator, librarian, and scholar in Irish history.

== Early life ==
He was the son of Charles Hawkes Todd, a professor of surgery, and Eliza Bentley, and was the oldest of fifteen children. Noted physician Robert Bentley Todd, Very Rev. William Gowan Todd, and physician Armstrong Todd were among his younger brothers. His father died a year after he received a B.A. from Trinity College in 1825, diminishing his prospects for success. However, he was able to remain at the college by tutoring and editing a church periodical.

== Professional life ==
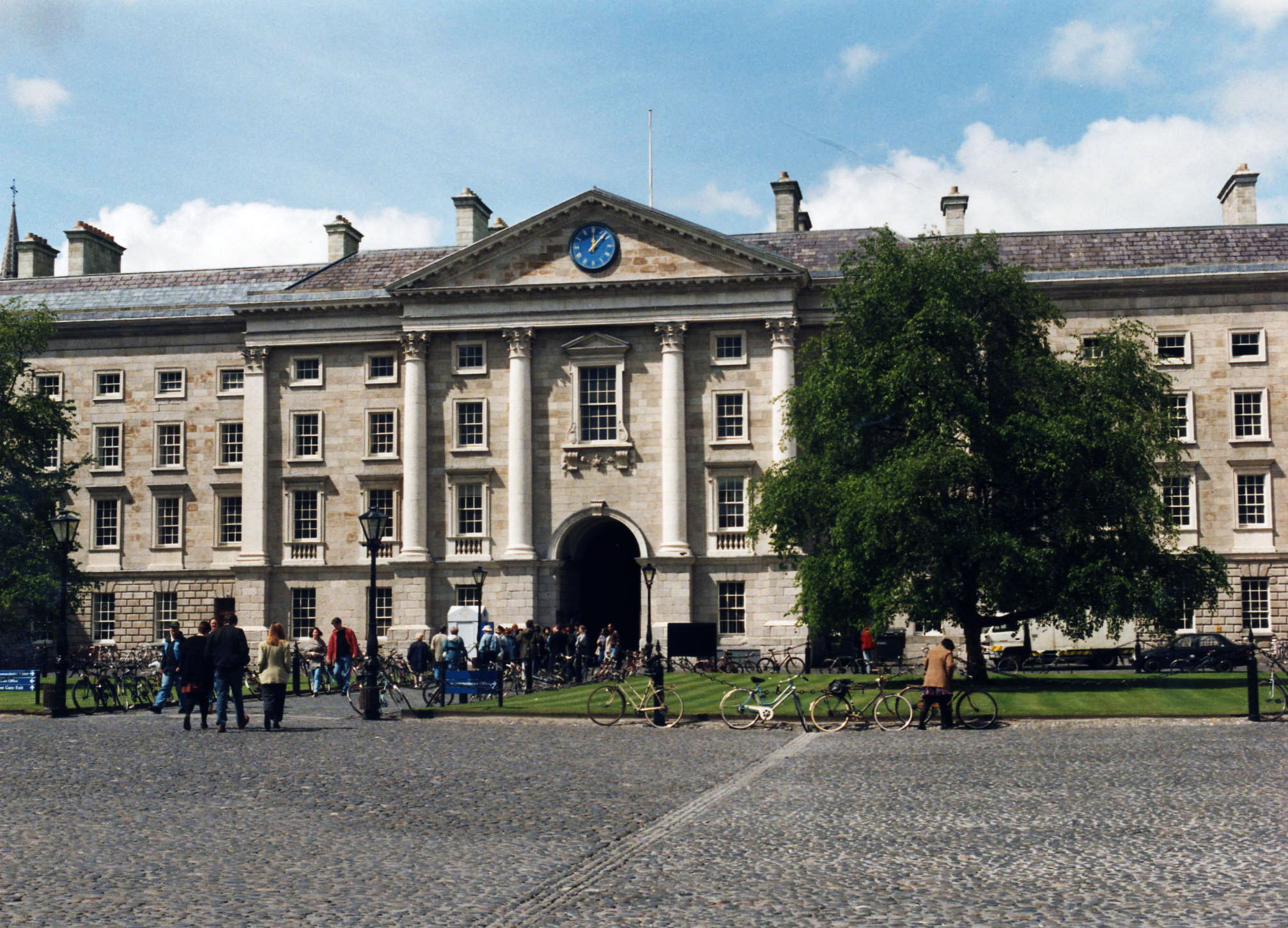
Regent House at Trinity College

He obtained a premium in 1829, and two years later was elected Fellow, taking deacon's orders in the same year. From that time until 1850, when he became a Senior Fellow, he was among the most popular tutors in Trinity College.

Todd took priest's orders in 1832. He began publishing in earnest, including papers on John Wycliffe, church history, and the religious questions of his day. He was Donnellan Lecturer in 1838 and 1839, publishing works related to the Antichrist in which he opposed the views of the more extreme of his co-religionists who applied this term to the Roman Catholicism and the Pope. In 1840 he graduated Doctor of Divinity.

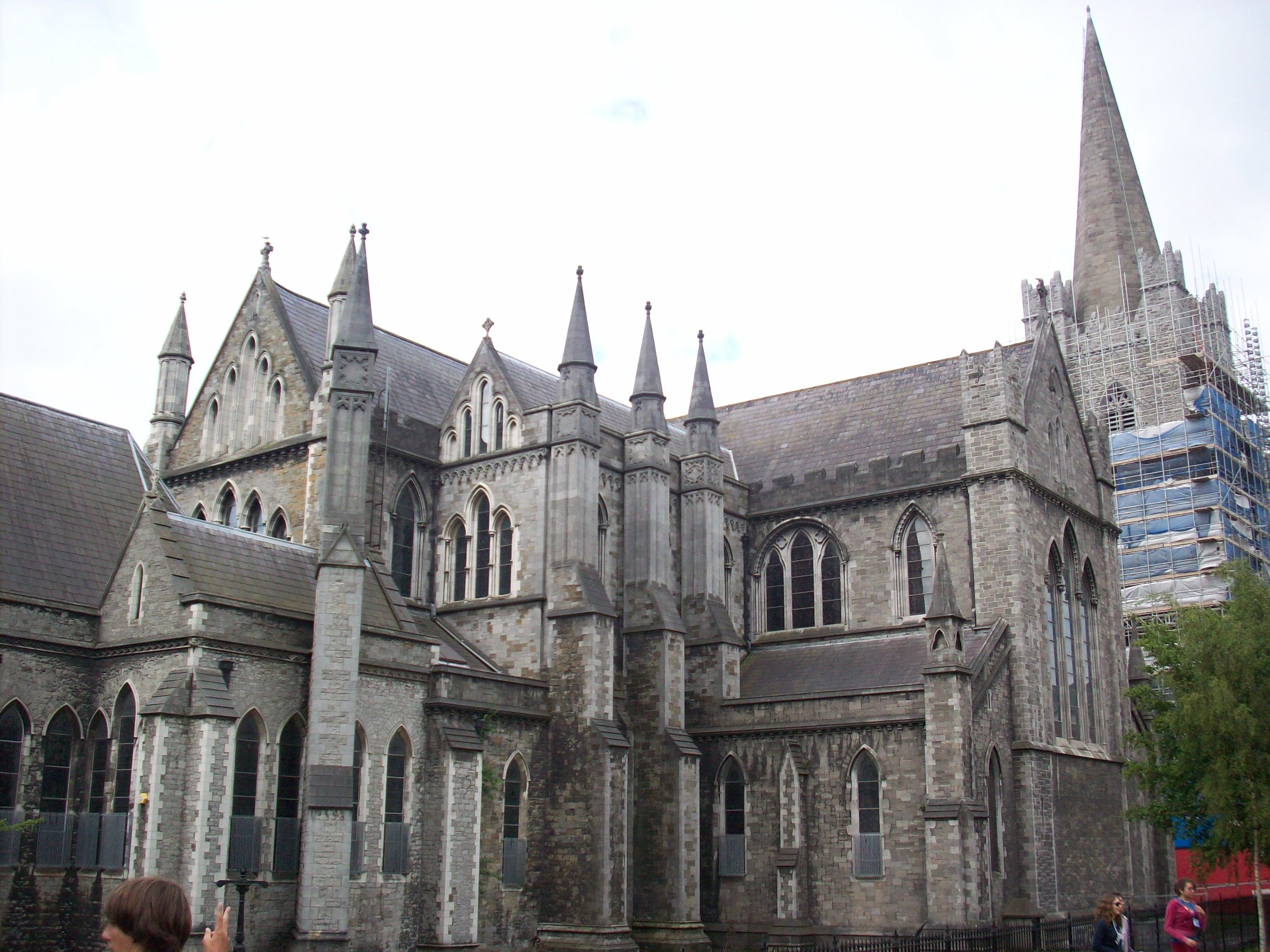
Saint Patrick's Cathedral, Dublin

In 1837 he had been installed Treasurer at St. Patrick's Cathedral in Dublin, and would become Precentor in 1864. His style of preaching was described as simple and lucid, and his sermons interesting. He co-founded Saint Columba's College in 1843, a school which promoted the Irish language for those who intended to take orders, as well as promoting the principles of the Church of Ireland.

In 1840 Todd co-founded the Irish Archaeological Society and acted as its honorary secretary. He was elected a member of the Royal Irish Academy, and strove actively to acquire transcripts and accurate accounts of Irish manuscripts from foreign libraries. He was honorary secretary from 1847 to 1855, and president from 1856 to 1861. In 1860 he was given an ad eundem degree at Oxford.

In 1849 Todd was made Regius Professor of Hebrew at Trinity, and a Senior Fellow the following year. In 1852 he was appointed Librarian, and working alongside John O'Donovan and Eugene O'Curry, he classified and arranged the collection of manuscripts. When his office received money, he spent it on the acquisition of manuscripts and rare books, and he deserves much credit for the library's high ranking as one of the chief libraries of Europe.

Alongside Charles Graves he presented a proposal to the British government which led to the formation of the Brehon Law Commission in December 1852. Roman Catholic convert Edwin Wyndham-Quin and artist Sir George Petrie joined Todd and Graves on the Commission board, which employed both O'Donovan and O'Curry.

His work was widely respected and cited. Among his friends and acquaintances were lawyer and poet Sir Samuel Ferguson, Conservative MP, fellow historian William Reeves, and the Stokes family (physician father William, future lawyer and Celticist son, Whitley, and future antiquarian daughter Margaret).

James Henthorn Todd died at his house in Rathfarnham on 28 June 1869 and was buried in the churchyard of St. Patrick's Cathedral.

== Partial bibliography ==
- The Last Age of the Church, Attributed to John Wycliff (1840)
- An Apology for Lollard Doctrines, by John Wycliffe (1842)
- The Book of Obits and Martyrology of the Catholic Church of the Holy Trinity: Commonly Called Christ Church, Dublin (1844) – with John Clarke Crosthwaite
- Six Discourses on the Prophecies Relating to Antichrist in The Apocalypse of St. John (1846)
- The Search After Infallibility: Remarks on the Testimony of the Fathers to the Roman Dogma of Infallibility (1848)
- Leabhar Breathnach Annso Sis: The Irish Version of the Historia Britonum of Nennius (1848, with Herbert Algernon)
- Three Treatises by John Wycklyffe, D. D. (1851)
- A Catalogue of the Collection of Tracts for and against Popery (1859)
- The Martyrology of Donegal: A Calendar of the Saints of Ireland (1864) – with William Reeves
- St. Patrick, Apostle of Ireland, A Memoir of his Life and Mission (1864)
- The Books of the Vaudois: The Waldensian Manuscripts Preserved in the Library of Trinity College, Dublin (1865)
- Some Account of the Irish Manuscript Deposited by The President De Robien in the Public Library of Rennes (1867)
- Cogadh Gaedhel Re Gallaibh, or The War of the Gaedhil With the Gaill (1867) – Todd's use and translation of Scandinavian sources brought personal descriptions of the Norsemen into light, such as that of Brodir, who is reputed to have killed Brian Boru at the Battle of Clontarf
- A Descriptive Catalogue of the Contents of the Irish Manuscript Commonly Called The Book of Fermoy (1868)
- Leabhar Imuinn: The Book of Hymns of the Ancient Church of Ireland (1869)

== See also ==
- Tadhg Og Ó Cianáin
- Peregrine Ó Duibhgeannain
- Lughaidh Ó Cléirigh
- Mícheál Ó Cléirigh
- Sylvester O'Halloran
- James Ussher
- Sir James Ware
- Mary Bonaventure Browne
- Dubhaltach Mac Fhirbhisigh
- Ruaidhrí Ó Flaithbheartaigh
- Uilliam Ó Duinnín
- Charles O'Conor (historian)
- Eugene O'Curry
- John O'Donovan (scholar)

== Works ==
Several of his works

- Wycliffe, John (1840), Todd, James Henthorn (ed.), The Last Age of the Church, Attributed to John Wycliffe, Dublin: University Press
- Wycliffe, John (1842), Todd, James Henthorn (ed.), An Apology for Lollard Doctrines, Attributed to Wycliffe., London: Camden Society
- Todd, James Henthorn (1844), "Introduction", in Crosthwaite, John Clarke (ed.), The Book of Obits and Martyology of the Cathedral Church of the Holy Trinity, Dublin: The Irish Archaeology Society
- Todd, James Henthorn (1846), Six Discourses on the Prophecies Relating to Antichrist in The Apocalypse of St. John, Dublin: Hodges and Smith
- Todd, James Henthorn (1848), The Search After Infallibility: Remarks on the Testimony of the Fathers to the Roman Dogma of Infallibility, London: John Petheram
- Nennius (c. 796), Todd, James Henthorn; Algernon, Herbert (eds.), Leabhar Breathnach Annso Sis: The Irish Version of the Historia Britonum of Nennius, Dublin: The Irish Archaeological Society (published 1848)
- Wycliffe, John (1851), Todd, James Henthorn (ed.), Three Treatises by John Wycklyffe, D. D., Dublin: Hedges and Smith
- Todd, James Henthorn; Reeves, William, eds. (1864), The Martyrology of Donegal: A Calendar of the Saints of Ireland, Dublin: The Irish Archaeological Society
- Todd, James Henthorn (1863), St. Patrick, Apostle of Ireland, A Memoir of his Life and Mission, Dublin: Hodges, Smith & Co. (published 1864)
- Todd, James Henthorn (1865), The Books of the Vaudois: The Waldensian Manuscripts Preserved in the Library of Trinity College, Dublin, London: Macmillan & Co
- Todd, James Henthorn (1867), Some Account of the Irish Manuscript Deposited by The President De Robien in the Public Library of Rennes, Dublin
- Todd, James Henthorn, ed. (1866), Cogadh Gaedhel Re Gallaibh, or The War of the Gaedhil With the Gaill, London: Longmans, Green, Reader, and Dyer (published 1867)
- Todd, James Henthorn, ed. (1869), Leabhar Imuinn: The Book of Hymns of the Ancient Church of Ireland, Dublin: The Irish Archaeological Society

About his works

- Denison, E. B. (1848), Six Letters on Dr. Todd's Discourses on the Prophecies Relating to Antichrist in the Apocalypse, London: William Edward Painter
- Gargan, Denis (1864), The Ancient Church of Ireland: A Few Remarks on Dr. Todd's "Memoir of the Life and Mission of St. Patrick, Apostle of Ireland", Dublin: James Duffy
