= Todd's paresis =

- Other names: Todd's paralysis, Todd's palsy, postictal paresis, postictal paralysis
- Specialty: Neurology

Todd's paresis (or postictal paresis/paralysis, "after seizure") is focal weakness in part of the body after a seizure. This weakness typically affects the limbs and is localized to either the left or right side of the body. It usually subsides completely within 48 hours. Todd's paresis may also affect speech, eye position (gaze), or vision.

The condition is named after Robert Bentley Todd (1809–1860), an Irish-born London physiologist who first described the phenomenon in 1849. It may occur in up to 13% of seizure cases. It is most common after a focal motor seizure affecting one limb or one side of the body. The generally postulated cause is the exhaustion of the primary motor cortex, although no conclusive evidence is available to support this.

== Presentation ==
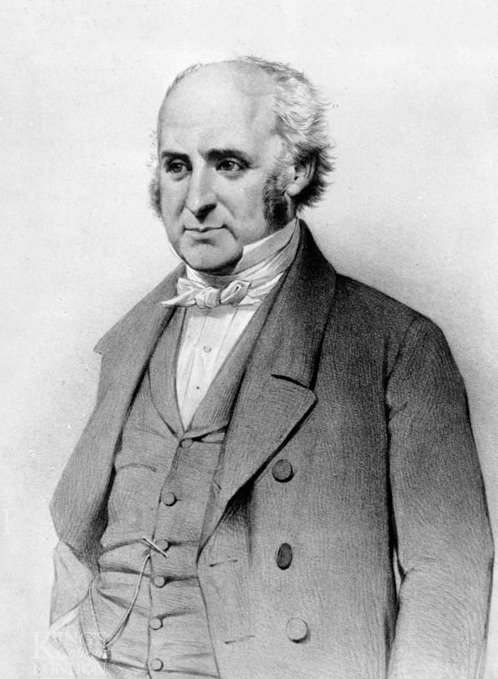
Robert Bentley Todd

The classic presentation of Todd's paresis is a transient weakness of a hand, arm, or leg after focal seizure activity within that limb. The weakness may range in severity from mild to complete paralysis.

When seizures affect areas other than the motor cortex, other transient neurological deficits can take place. These include sensory changes if the sensory cortex is involved by the seizure, visual field defects if the occipital lobe is involved, and aphasia if speech, comprehension or conducting fibers are involved.Postictal paresis (PP), although familiar to neurologists, has not been well-studied. One retrospective observational study evaluated 328 selected patients from ages 16 to 57 years who had prolonged video-electroencephalogram (EEG) monitoring for medically intractable epilepsy and focal seizure onset; those with nonepileptic seizures, status epilepticus, and Lennox-Gastaut syndrome were excluded. The following observations were made:

- PP occurred in 44 patients (13.4 percent)
- PP was always unilateral and always contralateral to the seizure focus
- The mean duration of PP was 174 seconds (range 11 seconds to 22 minutes)

Of all seizures followed by PP, the following features were noted:

- Obvious ictal motor activity was seen in 78 percent (Todd's paresis is more common after any clonic seizure activity)
- Very slight ictal motor activity was seen in 10 percent
- No ictal motor activity was seen in nearly 10 percent
- The most common ictal lateralizing sign was unilateral clonic activity in 56 percent
- Ictal dystonic posturing occurred in 48 percent
- Ictal limb immobility occurred in 25 percent

The results of this study are valuable because few other data exist on the frequency, duration, and seizure characteristics associated with PP. However, the study is likely biased by the inclusion only of patients with medically intractable seizures who had undergone video-EEG monitoring, and the results may not extrapolate to a general epilepsy population.

Other post-ictal neurological findings that do not involve activity of the area affected by the seizure have been described. They are thought to be caused by a different mechanism than Todd's paresis, and including paralysis of the contralateral limb, and rare genetic causes of hemiplegia and seizures.

== Causes ==
The cause of Todd's paresis has been attributed to the affected cortex being ‘exhausted’ or silenced due to increased inhibition, but these conjectures are not supported. It has been observed that the impairments that follow seizures are similar to those that follow strokes, where for a period of time blood flow to certain areas of the brain is restricted and these areas are starved of oxygen.

== Diagnosis ==
One of the main challenges with Todd's paresis is distinguishing it from a stroke. This is made harder because some strokes can cause focal seizures during the early stage. In such cases, Todd's paresis might make the neurological damage seem worse due to the stroke itself, leading to incorrect decisions about urgent stroke treatments like thrombolysis. Therefore, having a seizure during a stroke is generally considered a reason to be cautious about using thrombolytic therapy, especially if there's no clear evidence of a blocked blood vessel in the brain using imaging techniques.

An infant with Todd's paresis does not necessarily preclude the diagnosis of a febrile convulsion. This view is as a result of a recent study that showed the incidence of Todd's paresis to be in 0.4% of infants that have been diagnosed with a febrile convulsion.

== Treatment ==
There is no treatment for Todd's paralysis. Individuals must rest as comfortably as possible until the paralysis disappears.

== Prognosis ==
An occurrence of Todd's paralysis indicates that a seizure has occurred. The prognosis for the patient depends upon the effects of the seizure, not the occurrence of the paralysis.
