= Charles Hawkes Todd =

Irish physician (1784–1826)

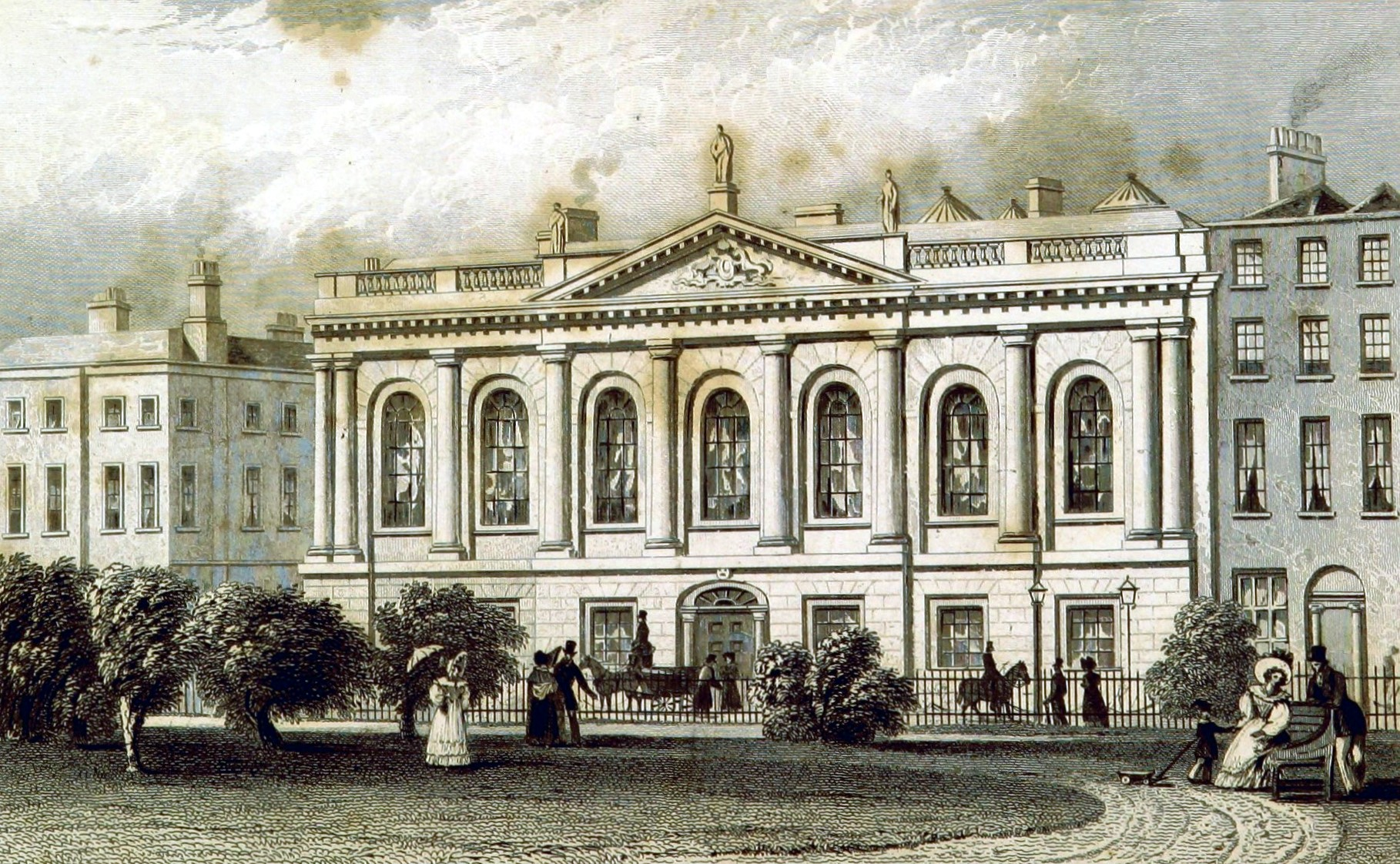
"The College of Surgeons, Dublin". 1837.

Charles Hawkes Todd (6 November 1784 – 19 March 1826) was a medical doctor and the president of the Royal College of Surgeons in Ireland (RCSI) in 1821.

== Early life ==
The son of physician and apothecary Andrew Todd (1750–1795) and Alicia Hawkes (1745–1818), Charles was born in Sligo, Ireland, on 6 November 1784. In 1804, Charles married Elizabeth Bentley (1786–1862), who was the daughter of Colonel Robert Bentley (1744–1822) and Mary Stanley (doed 1820).

== Professional life ==
He was educated in a Dublin school but did not enter the University. Instead, he was indentured to [Dr.] James Henthorn, who was related by marriage. Todd passed his examination on 28 June 1803 at the Royal College of Surgeons in Dublin. In April 1809, he was appointed to the position of Surgeon to the House of Industry Hospitals (later became Carmichael School), where he taught anatomy and surgery in a medical school attached to these hospitals. In 1819, Todd was appointed Professor of Anatomy and Surgery at the Royal College of Surgeons in Ireland. In 1821, he became president of that college.

In tribute, the Royal College placed his bust in their principal hall. In memory of Charles and Elizabeth, Dublin's medical students erected a tablet at St. Patrick's Cathedral, and the surviving children added a memorial window.

== Personal life ==
Dr. Charles Todd and Elizabeth Bentley Todd had nine sons and six daughters, and all but three were married. Four of his sons were medical practitioners, three were members of the clergy, one was a barrister, and one was a solicitor. Their first son, James Henthorn Todd, was an Irish scholar and Regius Professor of Hebrew at Trinity College in Dublin. Their second son, Robert Bentley Todd, was a London-based physician best known for describing several medical conditions, including Todd's palsy. Their youngest son, Armstrong Todd, was also a London-based physician known for his work in anesthesiology and new surgical procedures.

The children of Charles and Elizabeth Bentley Todd were:

- Prof. James Henthorn Todd, D.D. (1805–1869) unmarried and died in Dublin, Ireland
- Elizabeth Hawkes Todd (1807–1878) married John Clarke Crosthwaite and died in Romford, London, England
- Alicia Maria Todd (1808–1892) married William Connor and died in West Bromwich, England
- Robert Bentley Todd, MD (1809–1860) married Elizabeth Mary Hart and died in London, England
- Rev. Andrew Gillmor Todd (1813–1869) married Dorothea Morton and died in County Cork, Ireland
- Anna Todd (abt. 1813–1877) unmarried and died in Dublin, Ireland
- Charles Hawkes Todd, Esq. (1814–1894) married Letitia Elizabeth Potts and died in Dublin, Ireland
- Margaret Gillmor Todd (abt. 1817–1876) married John Hart and died in Glanville, South Australia, Australia.
- Jane Stanley Todd (abt. 1818–1890) married Michael King and died in Limavady, County Londonderry, Ireland.
- Caroline Stanley Todd (abt. 1819–1899) married Arthur William Edwards and died in Dublin, Ireland
- Rev. William Gowan Todd, D.D. (1820–1877) unmarried, catholic priest, and died in Blackheath, London, England
- Mark Stanley Todd, MD (1821–1860) married Elizabeth Jane Jerome and died in Umballa, Haryana, India
- Arthur Bentley Todd, Esq. (1822–1874) unmarried and died in Dublin, Ireland
- Richard Cooper Todd, MD (1824–1890) first married Emma Newland, second married Emily Kate Wilson, and died in Folkestone, Kent, England
- Armstrong Todd, MD (1826–1873) married Frances Alicia Kinahann and died in Camberwell, London, England

Two children married into the same Hart family: John Harriott Hart of London and Mary Glanville Hart. That is, Robert Bentley Todd married Elizabeth Mary Hart and Margaret Gilmore Todd married John Hart (brother and sister married sister and brother).

In Romantic Ireland, historian Rev. Patricia [McKee] Hanna, Ph.D. describes James Henthorn Todd's family. She observed that in 1831, Asiatic cholera killed 5,632 people in Dublin and over 50,000 countrywide. While two members of the Todd family did become gravely ill, Hanna suggests the large family must have had proficiency in nursing and doctoring for all to have survived.

Charles Todd died on 19 March 1826 at No. 3 Kildare Street in Dublin. He is buried at St. James' Church, Dublin. His wife, Elizabeth Bentley Todd, died 12 January 1862 at her oldest son's home in Dublin. She is buried near her husband at St. James' Churchyard.

== See also ==
- List of presidents of the Royal College of Surgeons in Ireland
