= William Gowan Todd =

William Gowan Todd (1820–1877) was a nineteenth-century Anglo-Irish author and cleric. In the later years of his life he founded and managed St. Mary's Orphanage, Blackheath, England, where he died on 24 July 1877.

== Early life ==
The son of physician and president of the Royal College of Surgeons in Ireland (RCSI) Charles Hawkes Todd (1784–1826) and Elizabeth Bentley (1786–1862), William was born on 1820 in Dublin, Ireland. He is the eleventh of fifteen children and the brother of James Henthorn Todd, Robert Bentley Todd, and Armstrong Todd.

In 1831, Ireland suffered an epidemic of Asiatic cholera, which killed 5,632 people in Dublin and more than 50,000 in Ireland. It also nearly killed William Todd and his mother, Elizabeth.

There is unconfirmed evidence that Todd married. It is said that after Todd completed his doctorate in theology in Rome, his wife joined a religious order.

== Professional life ==
William Todd took holy orders in the Church of Ireland, part of the Anglican Communion. With the help of his brother, Rev. James Henthorn Todd, William published two books:

- The Church of St. Patrick: A Historical Inquiry into the Independence of the Ancient Church of Ireland (1844)
- A History of the Ancient Church of Ireland (1845)

Todd had earned an A.B. from Trinity College in Dublin and was working on his doctorate. About 1845, Todd left the Anglican Church and joined the Roman Catholic Church. He was motivated by his oldest brother's colleague John Henry Newman and the Oxford Movement. Newman published a document called, "Remarks on Certain Passages in the Thirty-Nine Articles," or Tract 90. Newman's argument centred on the idea that the identity of the Church of England was more Catholic than Protestant. Newman also left the Anglican Church to become a Roman Catholic. While Todd's departure from the church created discord among Anglo-Irish Protestant family members, his older brother James had leanings in the same direction.

Under the guidance of John Henry Newman, Todd transferred to Rome to complete his Doctor of Divinity. He subsequently became a Roman Catholic priest. His calling took him to the poorest parishes in London and London's Blackheath district. His brothers Dr. Robert Bentley Todd, Dr. Armstrong Todd, and other family members worked nearby.

About 1857, and under the direction of the Bishop of Southwark, William Gowan founded St. Mary's Orphanage for Boys at Park House, Cresswell Park, Blackheath, London. Residents arrived between 6 and 12 years old. They remained until they reached 14 or 15 years of age, old enough for apprenticeships and to go to work.

The Very Reverend William Gowan Todd, D.D. died at St. Mary's Orphanage at the age of 57 on 24 July 1877. He was buried on 27 July 1877 at Lewisham, London, England.

== Partial bibliography ==
Among Todd's other publications were:

- "The Daily Sacrifice, and Public Devotions of the Church, Four Lectures." 1865. Dublin. James Duffy
- "Lectures on the Inspiration and Interpretation of Holy Scripture" London. Richardson & Son
- "The Irish in England." London. Dolman & Co
- "The Patrons of Erin; Or, Some Account of the Tribes of St. Patrick and St. Brigid." 1859. London. Dolman & Co
- "Our Catholic Children. A Sermon." London. Burns & Lambert
- "Sacred History, from the Creation to the Destruction of Jerusalem." London. Richard and Sons
