= Charles Hawkes (priest) =

Irish Anglican priest (18th century)

Charles Hawkes was an Anglican priest in Ireland during the late Eighteenth century.

Hawkes was born at Skekyn in County Roscommon; and educated at Trinity College, Dublin. He was Archdeacon of Killala from 1770 until his death in 1788.
