= St Peter's Hospital, Covent Garden =

St Peter's Hospital
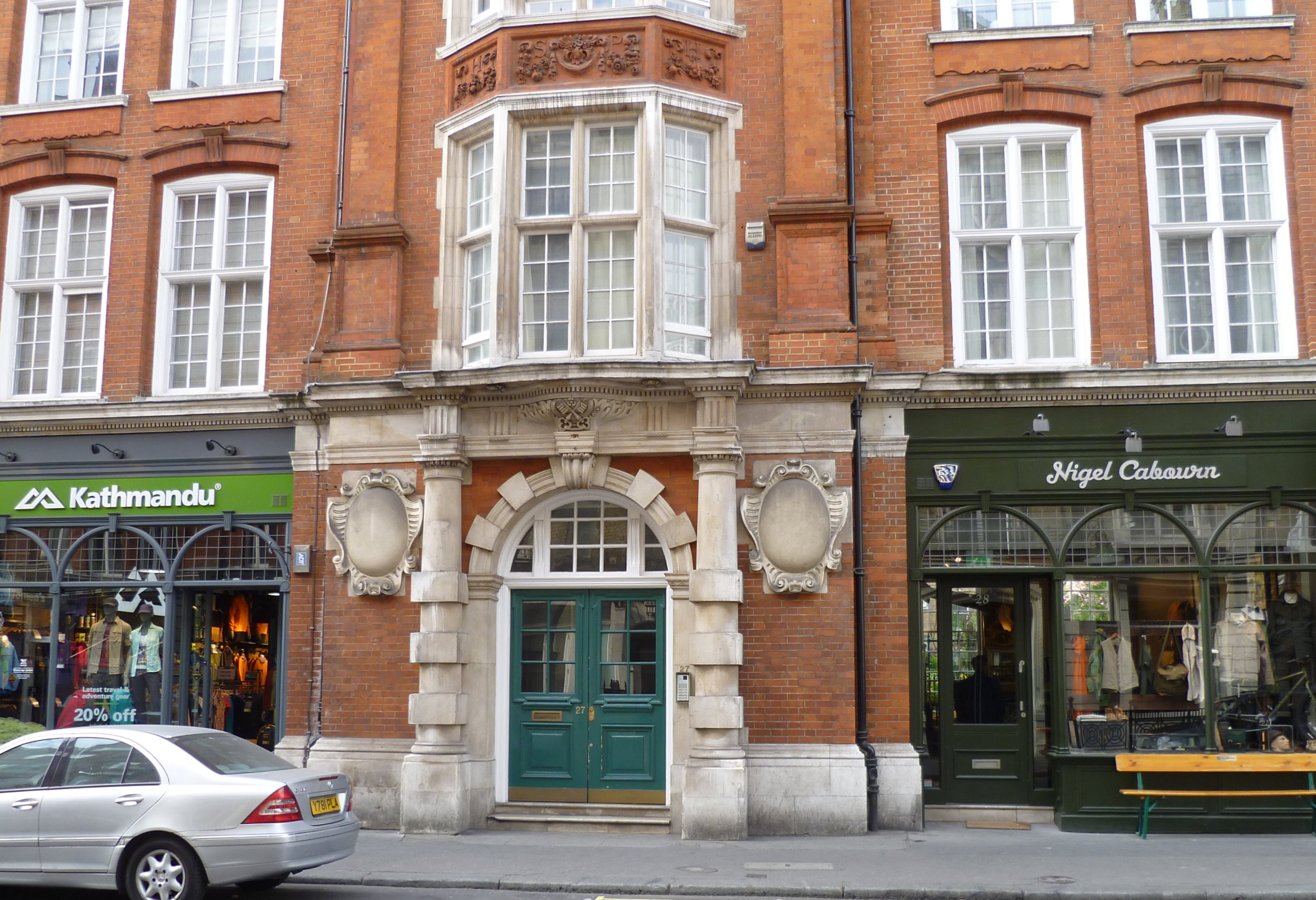
- Entrance to the former St. Peter's Hospital

- Location within Westminster

Geography
- Location: Covent Garden, London, England, United Kingdom
- Coordinates: 51.5110°N 0.1263°W

History
- Founded: 1860
- Closed: 1992

Links
- Lists: Hospitals in England

St Peter's Hospital is a former hospital in Henrietta Street, Covent Garden, London, which is a grade II listed building.

== History ==
Plans for the hospital were discussed at the home of Armstrong Todd, a surgeon who lived at London's 16 Burlington Street. The Hospital for Stone subsequently opened in 1860 at 42 Great Marylebone Street.

It moved again, this time to a purpose-built facility in Henrietta Street, designed by J. M. Brydon in the Queen Anne style and opened by Prince Leopold, Duke of Albany in 1882. Henry Clutton, the ninth Duke of Bedford's architect, required amendments to be made to the design to suit the Bedford Estate's requirements. The building was constructed in such a way as to allow it to be converted in the future into residential flats and chambers. It closed in 1948.

The hospital joined with St Paul's Hospital to form the Institute of Urology in 1948. The Institute was joined by St Philip's Hospital in 1952 and the hospitals became known as "the three Ps." After services were transferred to the Middlesex Hospital the Institute closed in 1992. The building in Henrietta Street has since been converted for residential use.
