= Fyfield Road =

Road in North Oxford, England

Coordinates: 51.7651°N 1.2555°W

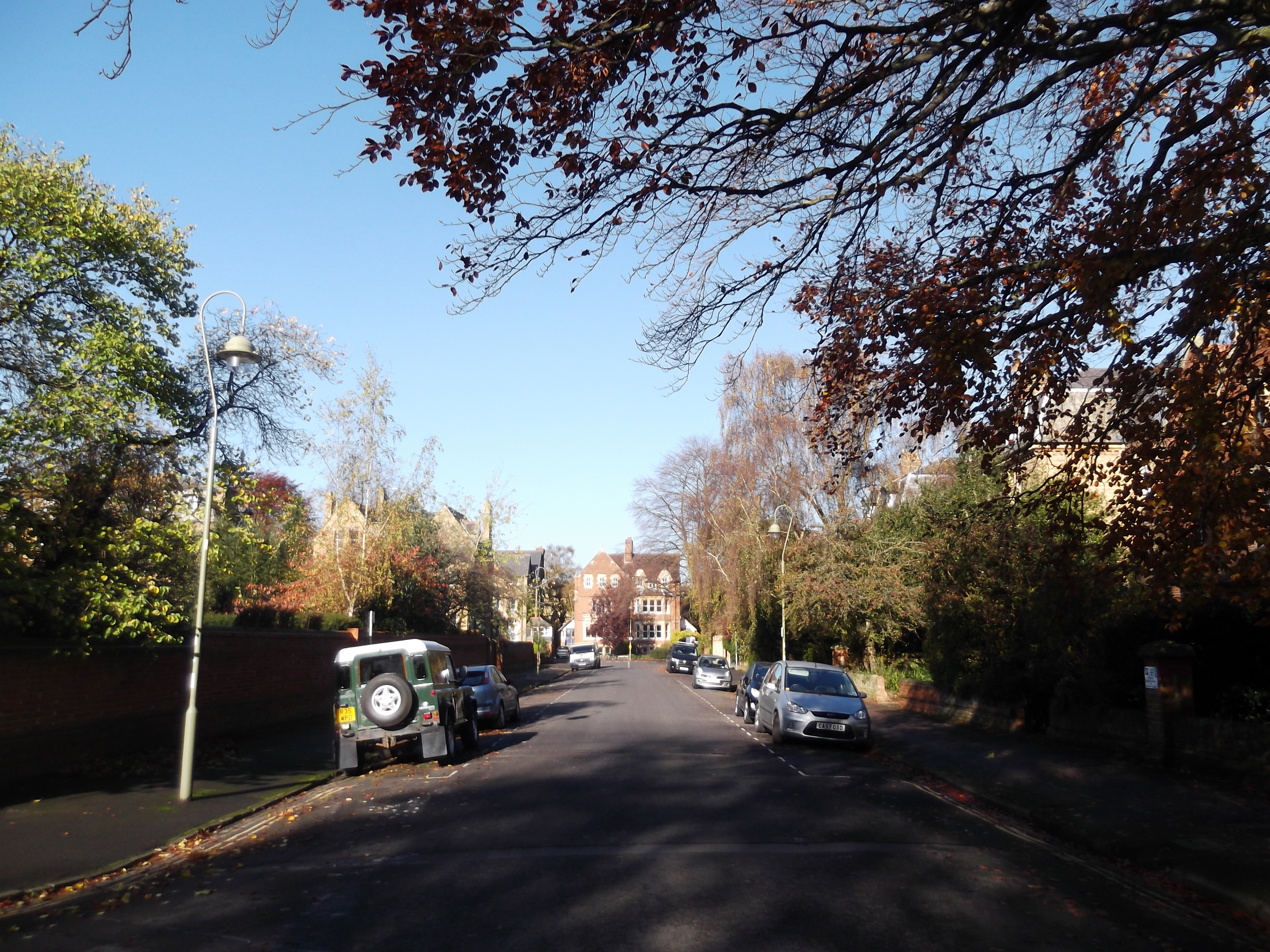
View north along Fyfield Road from the junction with Crick Road

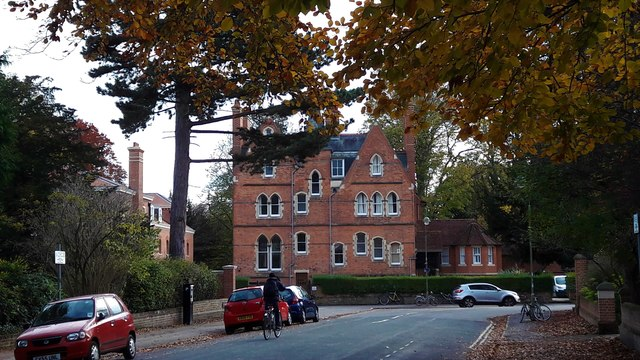
View south along Fyfield Road, with Gunfield at the end

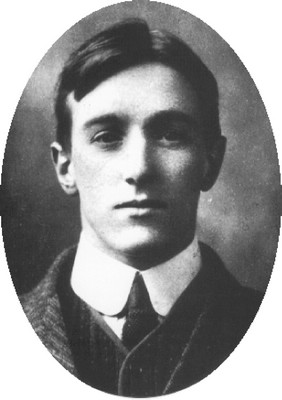
The historian and philosopher R. G. Collingwood, who lived at 5 Fyfield Road

Fyfield Road is a residential road in North Oxford, England, on the Norham Manor estate.

At the northern end of the road is a junction with Norham Road and at the southern end is a junction with Norham Gardens, was the University Parks opposite. Halfway along the road, Crick Road leads west to Bradmore Road. To the east is Lady Margaret Hall, one of the colleges of Oxford University. Fyfield Lodge is located at 13 Fyfield Road, more recently divided into five flats.

== History and residents ==
The Norham Manor estate where Fyfield Road is located was originally owned by St John's College, Oxford. The name of the road was taken from Fyfield in Berkshire (now in Oxfordshire), where the college held the manor. Houses in the road were first leased by the college between 1878 and 1887. They were designed by Frederick Codd (Nos 1, 13, and 14), William Wilkinson (Nos 2–4), and Pike & Messenger (Nos 5–12). The houses are in the traditional North Oxford Victorian style of brick construction.

R. G. Collingwood (1889–1943), philosopher, historian, and Fellow of Pembroke College, Oxford, lived at 5 Fyfield Road with his wife Ethel. Grace Eleanor Hadow (1875–1940), author and Principal of St Anne's College, Oxford (1929–40), lived at 7 Fyfield Road in 1936, marked with a blue plaque. The historian Henry William Carless Davis CBE FBA (1874–1928) lived at 11 Fyfield Road with his wife and three children, one of whom, later another historian Ralph Henry Carless Davis (1918–1991), was born at the house on 7 October 1918. Rev. Arthur Acland, a tutor at Christ Church, Oxford, leased 13 Fyfield Road in 1878. Joan Gili (1907–1998), a Catalan antiquarian book-seller, publisher and translator, lived at 14 Fyfield Road with his family from 1945 to 1969.

== See also ==
- Fyfield, Oxfordshire
