= Norham Manor =

Suburb of Oxford, England

Coordinates: 51.765°N 1.257°W

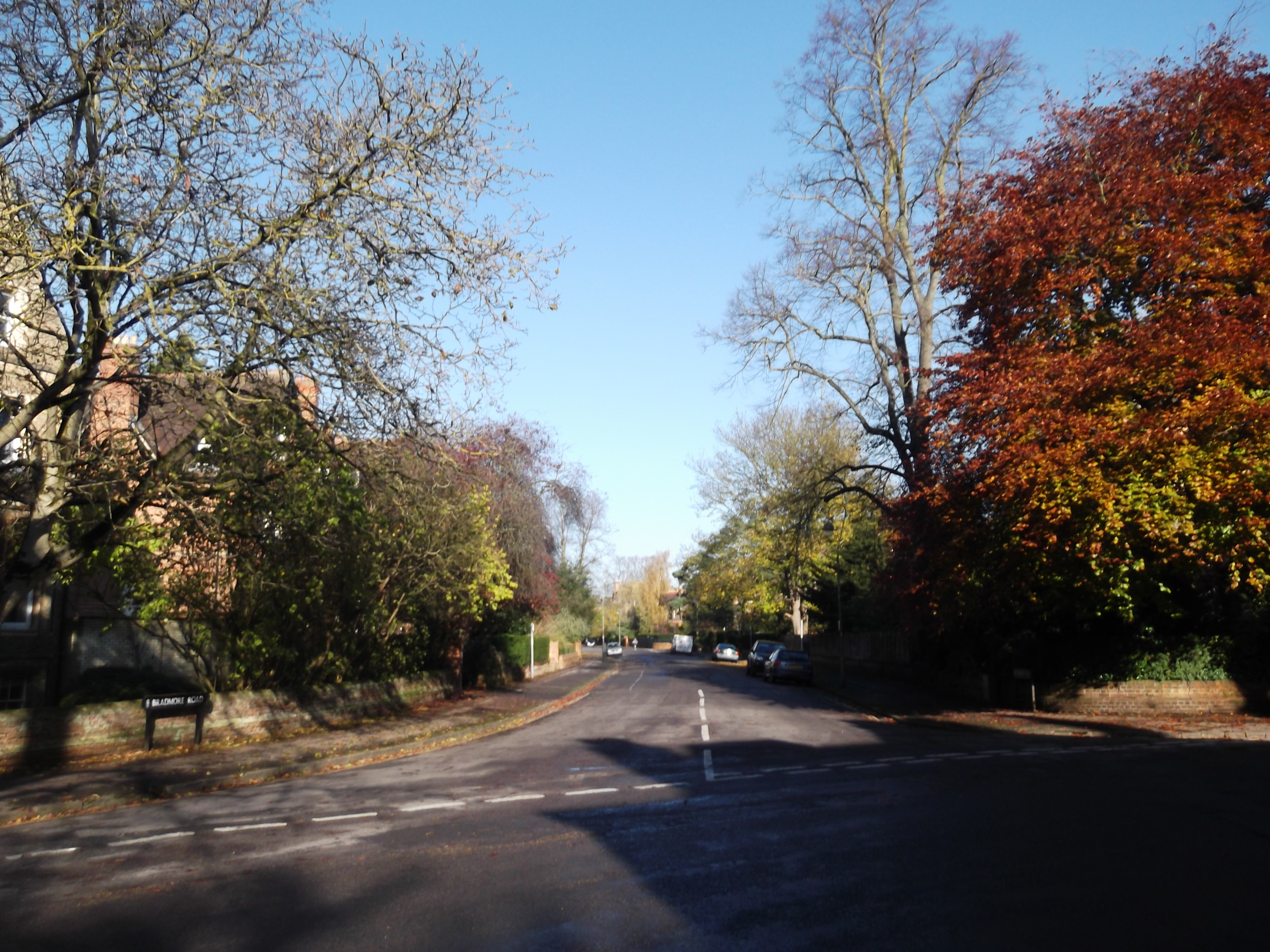
- View north along Bradmore Road from the junction with Norham Gardens in Norham Manor.

- Location within Oxfordshire
- OS grid reference: SP514075
- Civil parish: unparished
- District: Oxford
- Shire county: Oxfordshire
- Region: South East
- Country: England
- Sovereign state: United Kingdom
- Post town: Oxford
- Postcode district: OX2
- Dialling code: 01865
- Police: Thames Valley
- Fire: Oxfordshire
- Ambulance: South Central
- UK Parliament: Oxford West and Abingdon
- Website: Oxford City Council

The Norham Manor estate is a residential suburb in Oxford, England. It is part of central North Oxford. To the north is Park Town with its crescents, to the east is the River Cherwell, to the south are the University Parks and to the west is Walton Manor, on the other side of Banbury Road.

The architect William Wilkinson laid out the estate in the 1860s on land owned by St John's College, Oxford. The houses are large Victorian villas, many in Italianate and Gothic Revival styles. Wilkinson himself designed several of them, notably in Norham Gardens (built 1860–70). Others were designed by Charles Buckeridge (built 1862–66) and Frederick Codd.

Although originally intended as a residential area, Norham Gardens has hosted a number of educational institutions. Lady Margaret Hall, one of the University of Oxford's formerly women-only colleges, lies to the east of Norham Manor at the end of Norham Gardens and on the River Cherwell. Further north is the Dragon School, a private preparatory school. 66 Banbury Road, Oxford was occupied from 1930 by Wolsey Hall. As of 2006, Kellogg College moved to Norham Manor. The college houses its administrative offices at 62 Banbury Road. The French research centre Maison Française d'Oxford is located on Norham Road.

== Sources and further reading ==
- Eleanor Chance; Christina Colvin; Janet Cooper; C.J. Day; T.G. Hassall; Nesta Selwyn (1979). Crossley, Alan; Elrington, C.R. (eds.). Victoria County History: A History of the County of Oxford, Volume 4.
- Hinchcliffe, Tanis (1992). North Oxford. New Haven: Yale University Press. ISBN 0-300-05184-0.
- Sherwood, Jennifer; Pevsner, Nikolaus (1974). The Buildings of England: Oxfordshire. Harmondsworth: Penguin Books. p. 317. ISBN 0-14-071045-0.
- Tyack, Geoffrey (1998). Oxford An Architectural Guide. Oxford & New York: Oxford University Press. pp. 234–235. ISBN 0-19-817423-3.
