= Crick Road =

Road in North Oxford, England

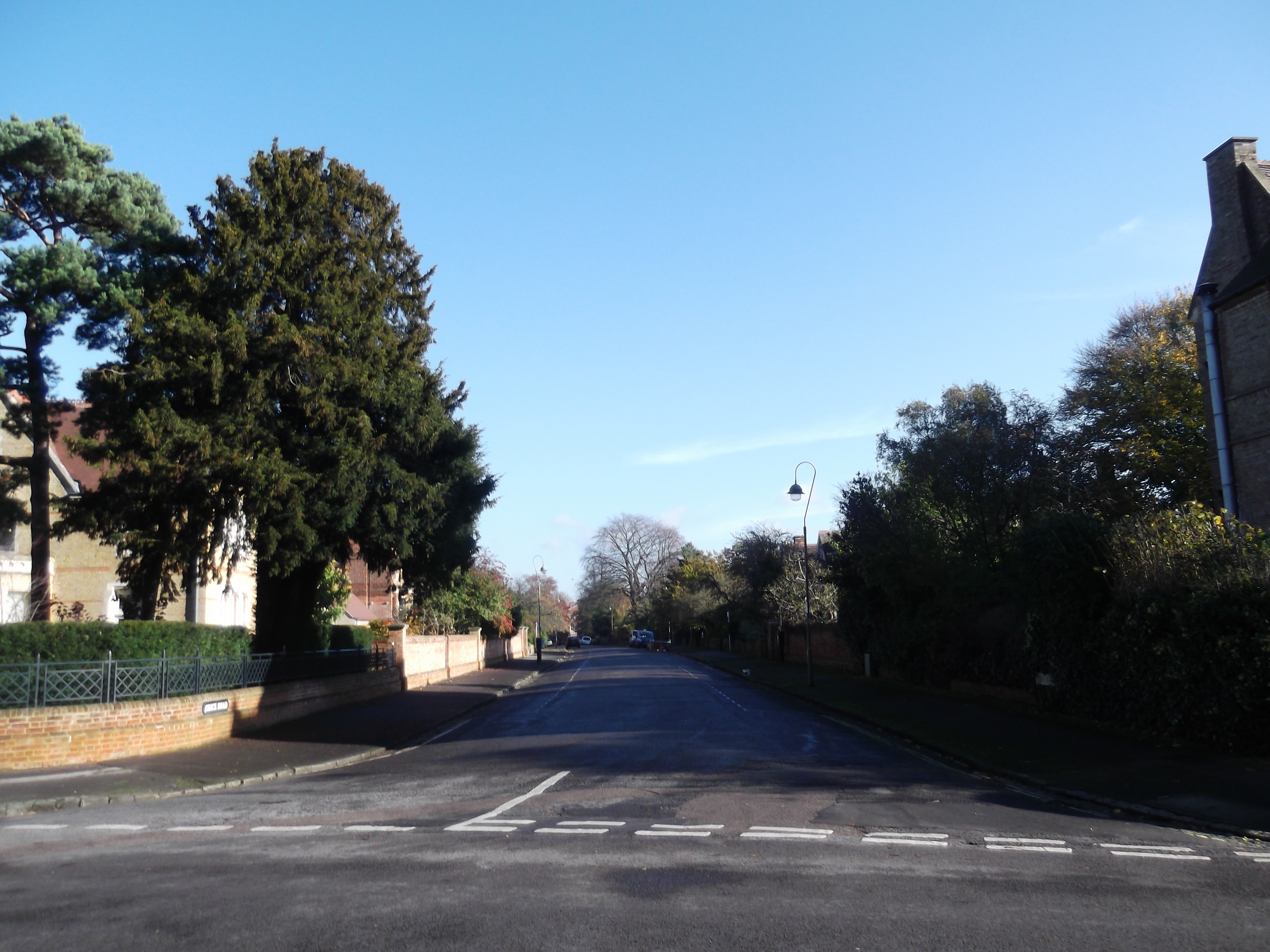
- View east along Crick Road from the junction with Bradmore Road
- Length: 200 m (660 ft)
- Postal code: OX2 6QJ
- Coordinates: 51.76475°N 1.25705°W
- west end: Bradmore Road
- east end: Fyfield Road

Construction
- Completion: 1876

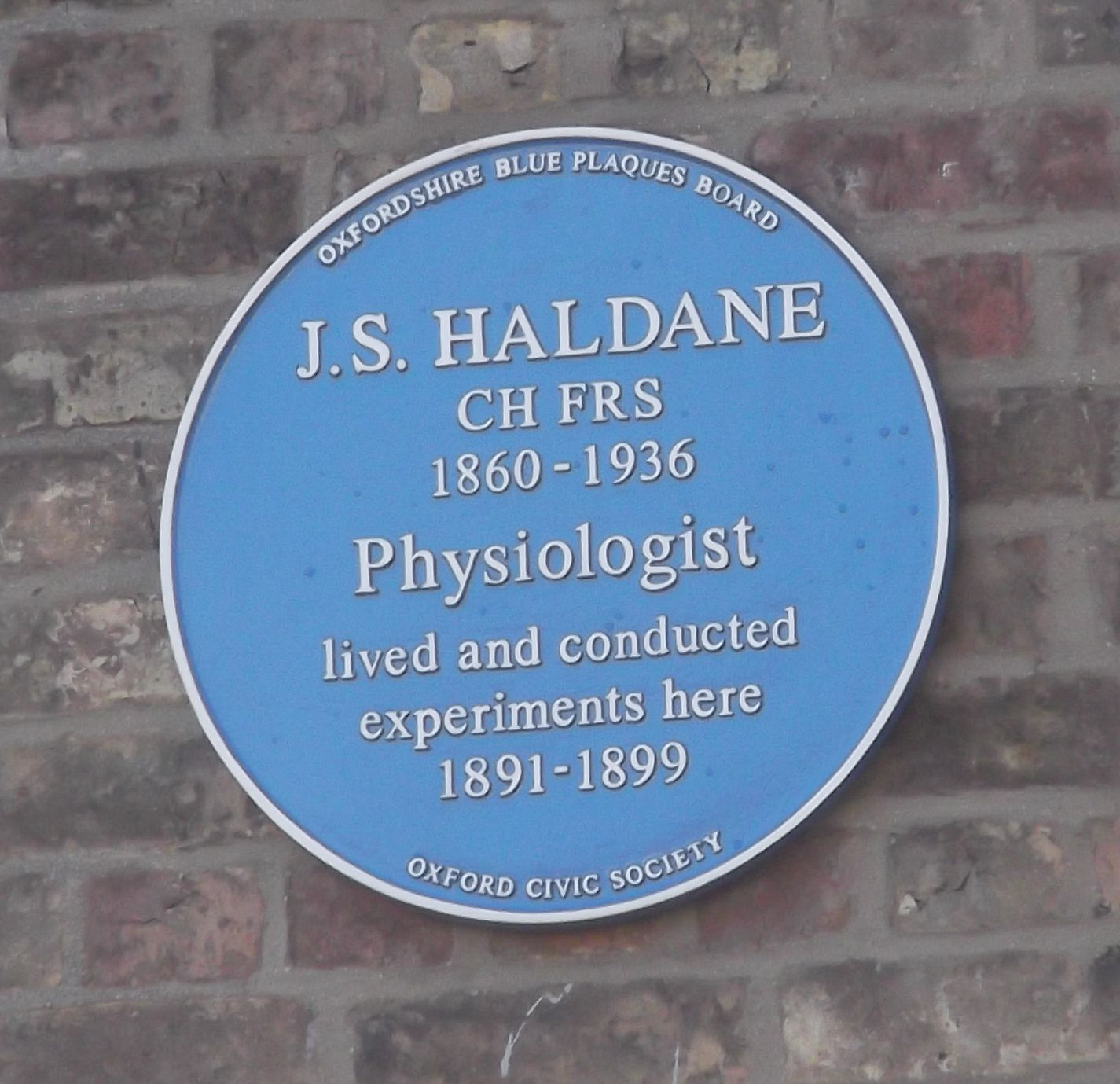
The blue plaque for the physiologist J. S. Haldane, who lived at 11 Crick Road during 1891–9.

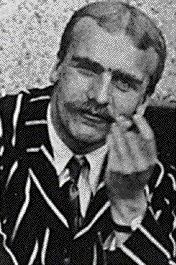
The geneticist J. B. S. Haldane FRS, the son of J. S. Haldane, who lived at 11 Crick Road.

Crick Road is a road in North Oxford, England, an area characterised by large Victorian Gothic villas.

== Location ==
At the western end is the Bradmore Road and at the eastern end is Fyfield Road. To the north is Norham Road and to the south are Norham Gardens and the University Parks.

== History and residents ==
Houses in the road were first leased between 1876 and 1880. Architects include Willson Beasley, Frederick Codd, Galpin & Shirley, and Frederick R. Pike. The houses are mostly in pairs, with Jacobean as well as more traditional North Oxford Gothic detailing.

In 1879, the school that was to become known as the Dragon School (previous known as the Oxford Preparatory School) moved from rooms at Balliol Hall in St Giles' to 17 Crick Road, which became known as "School House". The headmaster was initially A. E. Clarke and from 1886 Charles Cotterill Lynam (known as the "Skipper"). The school expanded and moved in 1895 to its current location at Bardwell Road, further north in North Oxford.

In 1879, the historian and later Master of Balliol College, Oxford, Arthur Lionel Smith married Mary Smith. They first lived at 7 Crick Road until 1893. They had had nine children together, six of whom were born at the house in Crick Road. In the 20th century 7 Crick Road was the home of the Principal of St. Edmund Hall, John Kelly, who let part of the building to undergraduates, and then bequeathed it to St. Edmund Hall in 1997.

The Haldane family lived at 11 Crick Road and the house is marked with a blue plaque. The family included the physiologist and father John Scott Haldane (1860–1936) and his wife Louisa, together with their children, the geneticist and evolutionary biologist J. B. S. Haldane (Fellow of New College, Oxford), and the novelist Naomi Mitchison. The family later moved to 'Cherwell' at the end of Linton Road to the north, now the location of Wolfson College on the banks of the River Cherwell.

The botanist and Mayor of Oxford, George Claridge Druce (1850–1932), moved to 9 Crick Road in 1909. He named the house "Yardley Lodge", after the village of Yardley Gobion where he lived in his youth. He died at his home and was buried in Holywell Cemetery, Oxford.
