= Norham Road =

Road in North Oxford, England

Coordinates: 51.7655°N 1.2586°W

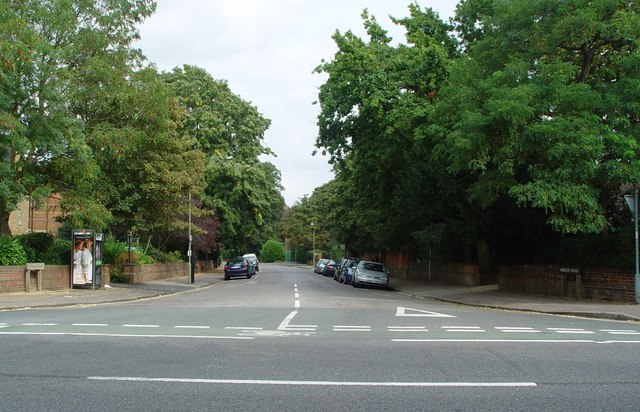
View east down Norham Road from Banbury Road.

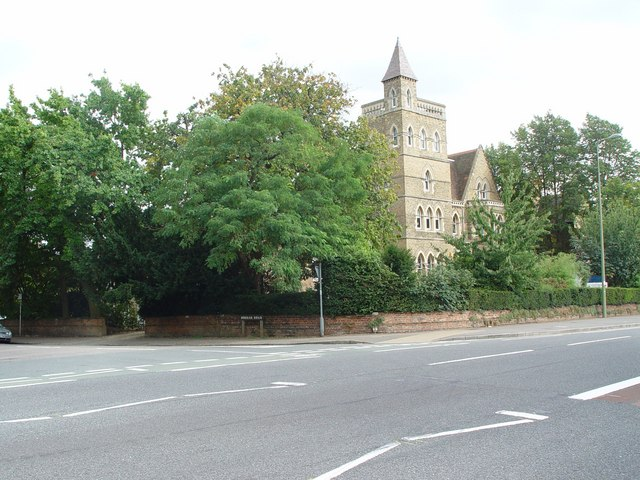
The junction of Norham Road with Banbury Road.

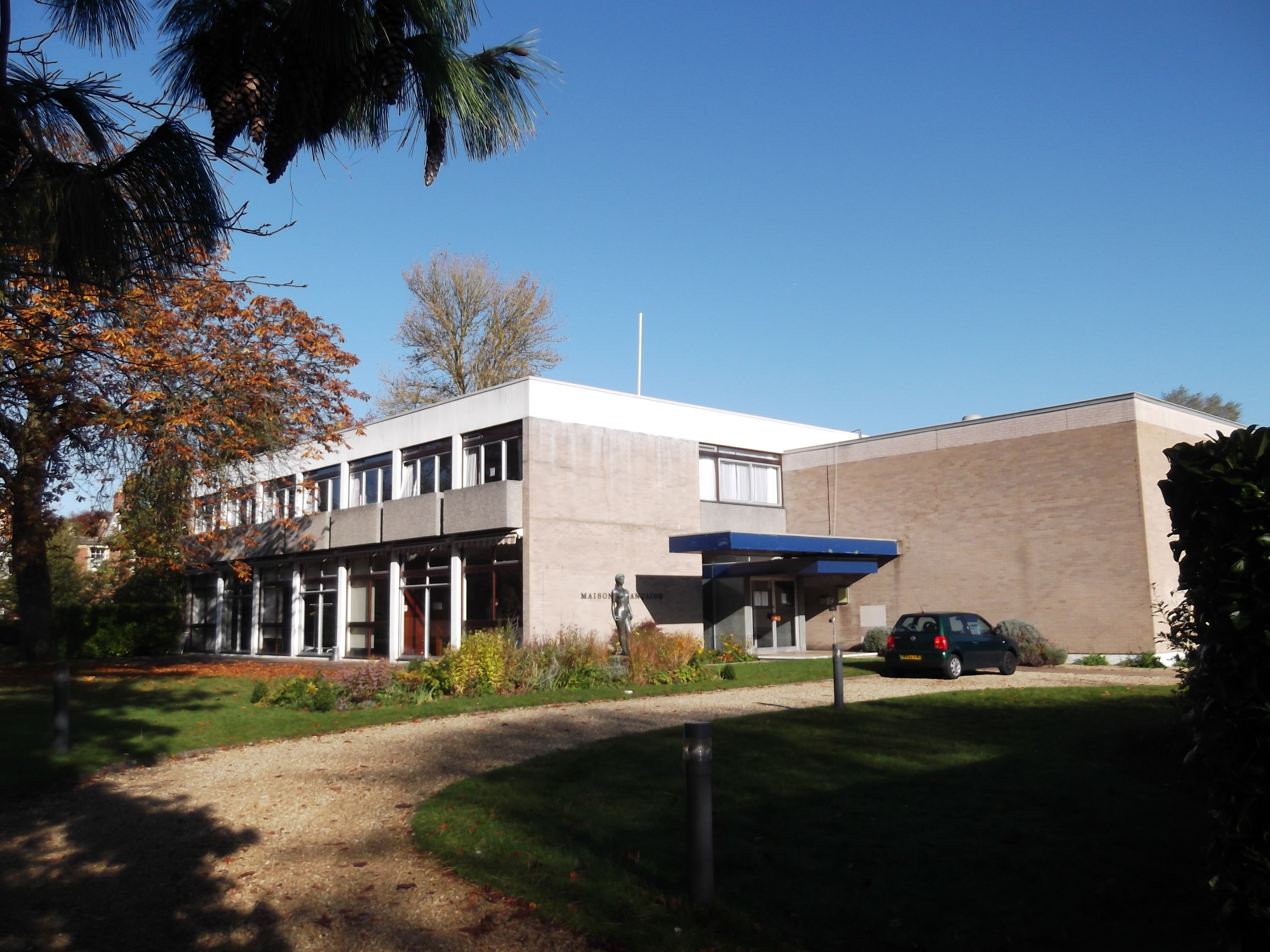
The Maison Française d'Oxford building at 2–10 Norham Road.

Norham Road is a road which lies east of the Banbury Road in central North Oxford, a suburb in the city of Oxford, England.

== Location ==
The road is within the Norham Manor area. It consists mainly of large Victorian houses, many of three storeys above ground with a basement below. To the south of the road are Bradmore Road near the western end and Fyfield Road near the eastern end, both connecting with Norham Gardens. To the north is Park Town. Pedestrian access at the eastern end leads north to the Dragon School, a preparatory school. The road continues to the east as Benson Place, which leads to Lady Margaret Hall, one of the Oxford University colleges, originally for women.

== History ==
The road is part of the Norham Manor estate within North Oxford, originally owned by St John's College, Oxford. It was developed by the college in the 1870s. The houses in the road were first leased between 1863 and 1905. William Wilkinson was the architect for many of the houses (numbers 14–26 and 30–35). Frederick Codd designed No. 13.

St Hugh's College was founded as a women's college by Elizabeth Wordsworth, great-niece of the poet William Wordsworth, at 25 Norham Road in 1886, using money left to her by her father Christopher Wordsworth (1807–1885), a Bishop of Lincoln. The college is now located in much larger premises on St Margaret's Road further north.

The Maison Française d'Oxford is a French research institute based at 2–10 Norham Road. It was originally set up by the University of Oxford and the University of Paris at the end of World War II. The current building was erected on an empty site on the north side of the road opposite Bradmore Road during 1961–2. It was designed by Jacques Laurent with Brian Ring, Howard & Partners.
