= Monica Charlot =

French historian of British culture & scholar (1933–2005)

- Prof. Charlot
- Born: 31 May 1933; Chalk Farm, London
- Died: 20 May 2005 (aged 71); Rennes, France
- Occupations: Historian and political scientist

Monica Charlot OBE née Monica Huber (31 May 1933 – 20 May 2005) was a historian and political scientist.

== Life ==
Monica Hubert was born at 6 Maitland Villas, Chalk Farm, in the St Pancras Borough, London, on 31 May 1933. Her father, Joseph, worked at the Swiss consulate. He and Doris May Hubert (née Fickling) had three children. Monica was brought up in England which was her mother's country whilst her father worked as the Swiss consul in Britain, New York and Australia. Monica attended Bedford College and studied French.

Whilst working as a language assistant in Paris she met her fiance. In 1956 her new husband was Jean Charlot who was a political scientist. After following her husband to Africa where he was serving his national service in Algeria, Monica Charlot decided to obtain French qualifications for her teaching skills. This route was possible as Charlot had Swiss, English and French citizenships and the latter was essential to take this qualification. By this point she and Jean had three daughters.

Charlot studied and competed against French students to become a qualified teacher (agrégée) of English. She spent only a few years teaching at Paris lycees before accepting a lectureship at the University of Nanterre. Charlot researched the British general elections from 1933 to 1970 and wrote this as her doctoral thesis and defended it in 1971. This successful thesis was important as previously studies by French students of British culture had concentrated on literature. Some of the changes Charlot introduced were seen as a popular answer to the issues raised by the 1968 student uprising.

Charlot became a Professor at the Sorbonne Nouvelle University. As professor of British civilisation she targeted adding the study the social and political aspects of culture as a valid part of British and American studies. She was able to ensure that teachers would need to study these aspects as she created an exam paper on British civilisation which teachers had to pass as well as the usual papers on literature and language. Meanwhile, her husband Jean taught electoral politics at (Sciences Po).

From 1984 to 1991 she was in Oxford directing Maison française d'Oxford which is a French institution sitting in Oxford University targeting cultural exchange with Britain. She exploited the Oxford University environment to diversify the institutions approach. Charlot was well qualified for this role as she had previously served on a trans-national political body created by Edward Heath and Georges Pompidou.

She created the Centre de Recherches et d'Études en Civilisation Britannique, a single body to address the study of British civilisation in France. By the time she died in 2003 there were 250 people around France who were members. Moreover, there were over a hundred post doctorate students who had obtained their qualifications with Charlot as their supervisor.

== Distinctions ==
Officier de la Légion d'honneur Officière de la Légion d'honneur; Officier de l'ordre national du Mérite Officière de l'ordre national du Mérite; Officier de l'Ordre des Palmes académiques Officière de l'ordre des Palmes académiques and Officer of the British Empire (OBE)

== Works ==
She created fifteen books in her own right including several that became standard works. Her books included:

- La démocratie à l'anglaise, 1972
- Le temps des incertitudes, 1981
- L'Angleterre, cette inconnue: une société qui change, 1980
- Victoria: le pouvoir partagé, 1989 (when partially translated it was called Victoria: the Young Queen).
