= Maison française d'Oxford =

French research centre

Coordinates: 51.7657°N 1.2591°W

Maison Française d'Oxford
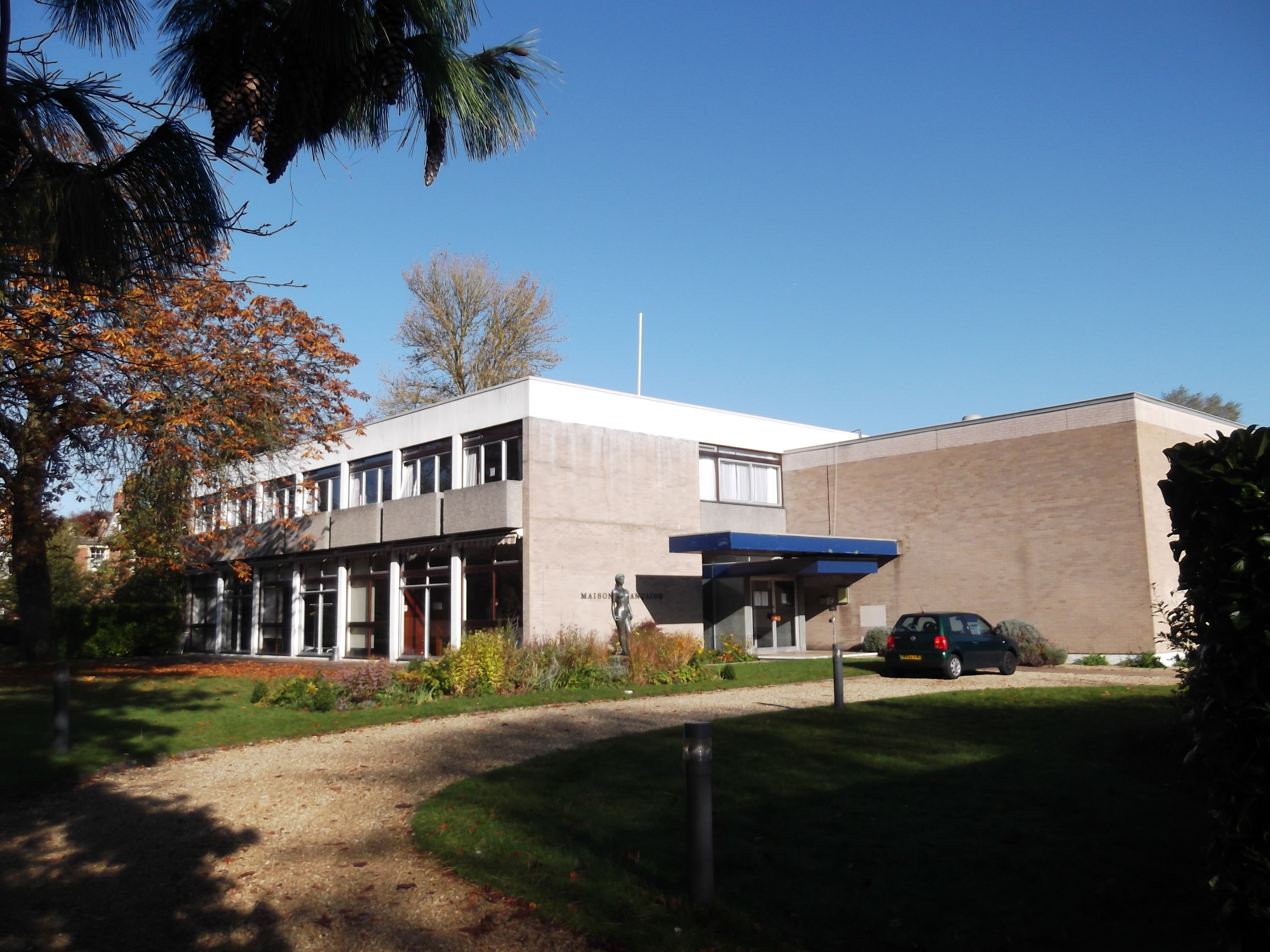
- Type: French Research Centre in the Humanities and Social Sciences
- Established: 1946
- Affiliations: Network of French Research Institutes Established Abroad (IFRE), University of Oxford, Chancery of the Universities of Paris, French Ministry of Foreign and European Affairs, CNRS
- Director: Stéphane Van Damme
- Location: Oxford, England, UK
- Website: https://mfo.web.ox.ac.uk/

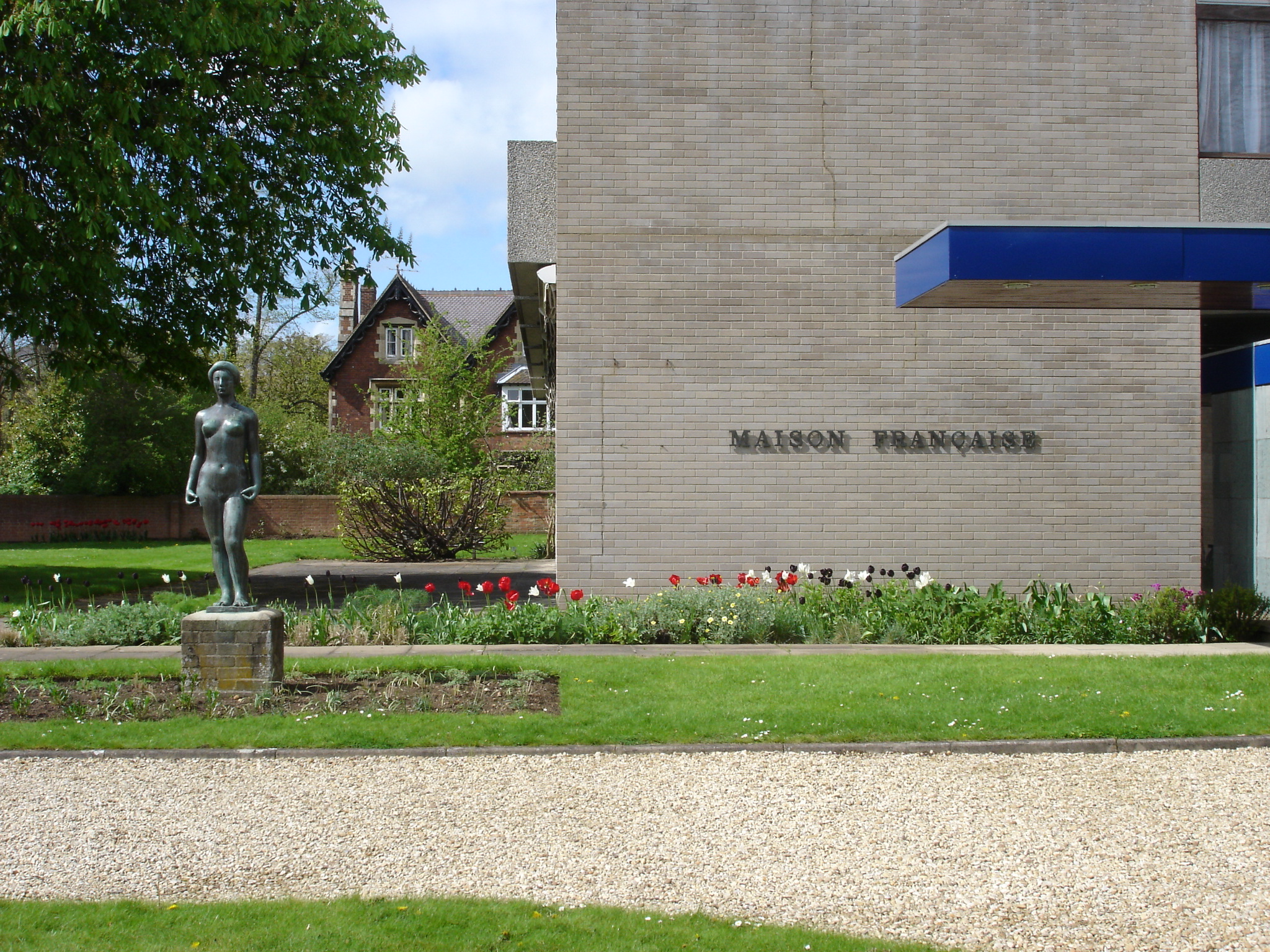
Outside the main entrance.

The Maison Française d'Oxford (MFO), known locally as simply Maison Française, is a French research centre in the humanities and social sciences and a member of the Network of French Research Institutes Established Abroad (IFRE) by the French Ministry of Foreign and European Affairs and the French National Centre for Scientific Research (CNRS).

== Overview ==
With the support of the Chancery of the Universities of Paris and the University of Oxford, the mission of the Maison Française is to work towards better integration of French research in the humanities and social sciences in national institutions, especially in the English-speaking world.

In 1999, it became a research centre of the Institute for the Humanities and Social Sciences (INSHS) of the CNRS, and it develops research and cultural programmes with the academic faculties at the University of Oxford and other British universities.

== Origin and historical context ==
The idea of establishing a French presence at the heart of the British academic world dates back to at least the beginning of the 20th century. It was supported in particular by the members of the French Club, which existed at the University of Oxford at the time and which brought together a community of francophile francophone students.

However, it was not until after the Second World War, in more favourable circumstances, that the project could be fully realised. The support that the United Kingdom had provided to the Free French had provoked a desire to consolidate the links between the two sides of the Channel, both culturally and academically. The Maison Française was brought into being at the beginning of the academic year of 1946, thanks to the initiative of the archaeologist Claude Schaeffer and under the guidance of Henri Fluchère, renowned academic, and a specialist in Shakespeare.

The current building was erected on an empty site on the north side of Norham Road in North Oxford, opposite Bradmore Road during 1961–2. It was designed by Jacques Laurent with Brian Ring, Howard & Partners. The first director at its new site was the French historian, François Bédarida (1966–1971) who opened the premises in 1967 the presence of André Malraux, the then Minister of Culture, to indicate the weight France placed on this outpost in the British Isles. From 1984 to 1991 Monica Charlot directed this institution that was targeting cultural exchange with Britain. She exploited the Oxford University environment to diversify the institution's approach.

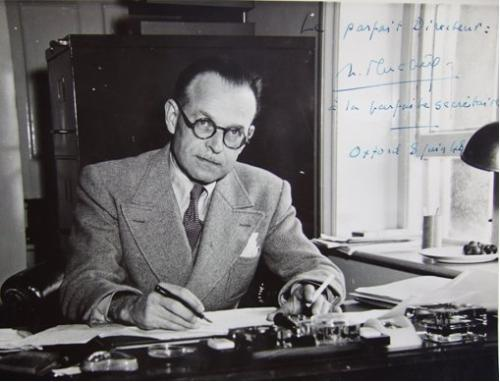
Henri Fluchère, first director of the Maison Française.

The name "Maison Française" was chosen in reference to the pavilions of the Cité Internationale Universitaire which opened in Paris in 1925 with the same ideals.

== Mission and principles ==
The mission and the principles of the Maison Française, as defined by the University of Oxford's decree of 22 October 1946 which confirmed its foundation, ruled out the idea of it being a teaching institution in its own right. There was no question of establishing a new college, nor even a branch of the Alliance française.

The Maison Française was to constitute a "new kind of institution", intended to promote academic, scientific and cultural exchange under the shared responsibility of the French Ministry of Foreign and European Affairs and the Universities of Paris and Oxford.

Aside from the establishment of a substantial library, the activities of the cultural legation comprised conferences and debates with French literary and scientific figures such as Albert Camus, François Mauriac, André Gide, Maurice Merleau-Ponty and Jacques Lacan. From its inception, the MFO organised exhibitions, concerts, theatre productions and cinema screenings, in the hope of promoting and maintaining French cultural prestige in all its aspects.

Important changes in direction have taken place since the 1980s. From the turn of the century, given media access to manifestations of French culture, and that other institutions in both London and Oxford are dedicated to the diffusion of French language and culture, the MFO's activities as a cultural pivot have declined somewhat. As of 2011 the mission of the Maison Française has been to focus especially on academic co-operation and research. This evolution was clearly marked by the establishment of a CNRS research unit within the MFO in 1999. In 2015–2016, this research unit is composed of six researchers grouped into different areas of study: literature, theory of law and legal anthropology, history and the classics.

The MFO is also home to a group of junior researchers (post-docs or research fellows) and research students, reading for master's degrees or doctorates. The research students are affiliated to institutes and colleges of the university, and take part in the activities of the MFO. To that end, the MFO collaborates with several French research institutions and universities whose students may spend periods of study there, ranging from one month to an academic year.

== Scientific activities ==
The MFO hosts a team of senior researchers from the INSHS who conduct their own research at the University of Oxford but it also organises interdisciplinary programmes, conferences, seminars and other events in collaboration with members of the university. The MFO organises and/or hosts events ranging from single-speaker lectures or seminars, to day-long (or longer) workshops and conferences on specialist topics.

Research programmes include:

- Classical and Byzantine Studies
- History and history of science
- Literature and Arts
- Politics, International Relations and Migration Studies
- Sciences and Interdisciplinarity

== Resources ==
=== Library ===
The Maison Française houses a study and information centre devoted to French culture and society. Its collection is made up of 35,000 volumes, around 50 periodicals, and a video library composed of more than 1000 French movies. Its catalogue is linked to libraries in the University of Oxford.

=== Online resources ===
To promote access to the research and the events organised at the Maison Française, a large number of presentations are recorded and directly accessible via its website as podcasts or reports.

== Sources ==
- Fluchère, Marie-Louise, La Maison Française à Oxford il y a 50 ans, self-published, 1996
- Vercoutter, Jean, "Notice sur la vie et les travaux de Claude Schaeffer-Forrer, membre de l'Académie", Comptes-rendus des séances de l'Académie des inscriptions et belles-lettres, 1989, vol. 133, n°1, p. 178–188
- Catto, Jeremy (s.d.), The History of the University of Oxford, Oxford University Press, 1994.
- MFO's archives (Activities report et archives files, Schaeffer in particular)
