= R. H. C. Davis =

British historian

Ralph Henry Carless Davis (7 October 1918 – 12 March 1991) was a British historian and educator specialising in the European Middle Ages. Davis was born and died in Oxford. He was a leading exponent of strict documentary analysis and interpretation, was keenly interested in architecture and art in history, and was successful at communicating to the public and as a teacher.

== Life ==
Much of this biography is derived from a memoire by G. W. S. Barrow published in the Proceedings of the British Academy.

=== Summary ===
- 1918. Born the son of University of Oxford history don Henry William Carless Davis (1874–1928).
- ?–1932. Attended the Dragon School, Oxford preparatory school.
- 1932–1937. Attended the Quaker school Leighton Park, Reading, Berkshire
- 1937–1939. Studied at Balliol College, Oxford, before World War II intervened.
- 1939–1945. During the war, as a conscientious objector, he joined the Friends' Ambulance Unit and served in Finland, the Mediterranean region and France.
- 1945–1947. Back to Balliol to take a first in Modern History and an MA.
- 1947–1948. Assistant history master at Christ's Hospital, Horsham.
- 1948–1956. Assistant lecturer at University College London, where research became an important part of his work. Married Eleanor Megaw in 1949.
- 1956–1970. Fellow and tutor in Modern History at Merton College, Oxford, where he produced a number of important works.
- 1970–1984. Professor of Mediaeval History at the University of Birmingham (UK).
- 1984–1991. Retirement.

=== Early life and influences, 1918–1939 ===
Ralph (pronounced to rhyme with 'safe') Davis was born on 7 October 1918 at 11 Fyfield Road, Oxford. He was the youngest of three sons of Henry William Carless Davis, CBE and Rosa Jennie Davis, daughter of Walter Lindup of Bampton Grange in West Oxfordshire. His father, who was Regius Professor of Modern History (Oxford) and from 1925 a fellow of the British Academy, died in 1928 when Davis was not yet 10 years old.

Earlier generations of the Davis family were involved in the Cotswold cloth industry at Stroud, Gloucestershire. The Lindup grandparents came from Worthing, Sussex, but in Davis's younger childhood owned a country house at Bampton, Oxfordshire which he and his brothers liked to visit.

Davis, like his older brothers, went to the Dragon School, and later, during World War II, contributed newsletters from Egypt and Syria to The Draconian, the school magazine.

The sudden death of his father placed financial constraints on the family, and it may have been this, or a suggestion of Gerald Haynes ('Tortoise'), a Dragon schoolmaster, which led Mrs. Davis to choose Leighton Park for Davis's secondary education. He was there from 1932 to 1937, and became involved in mediaeval architecture. Davis, as secretary of the small archaeology group and effectively its leader, organised bicycle trips round the Yorkshire abbeys in the school holidays with about six others. Davis never joined the Quakers, but he is thought to have absorbed his Christian convictions and liberal humanitarian ideals at Leighton Park. He served, later, as a governor of the school for many years.

Davis entered Balliol College, Oxford in 1937, preceded by both his brothers. As an undergraduate he arranged a one-month visit to northern Italy, taking in Milan, Venice, Ravenna and Florence. Also in this period he became interested in masons' marks and visited many Berkshire and Oxfordshire churches; this led to a paper in the Oxfordshire Archaeological Society's journal for 1938, and culminated in 1954 in the publication of his catalogue of masons' marks (see list of works below).

Professor Vivian Galbraith was an important influence during these years. He felt indebted to H. W. C. Davis since his undergraduate days, and was a close friend of the Davis family. Davis's first substantial scholarly work, his edition of The Kalendar of Abbot Samson (see list of works below), was suggested to him by Galbraith. Davis' tutor at Balliol was Richard Southern, a newly elected fellow, who described him as 'an absolutely steady and reliable performer'. Denys Hay, who did some teaching at Balliol, remembered an industrious but not very exciting student. Davis won the Kington Oliphant (historical) prize with the essay on mason's marks mentioned above.

=== World War II years, 1939–1945 ===
On 3 June 1939, three months before British declaration of World War II, Davis was provisionally registered as a conscientious objector to military service. He must have known what Nazi Germany was like, because he (and friend Ken Bowen) had just come back from a Quaker-organised hitch-hiking holiday in the Rhine valley, involving renovation and landscaping work with a joint British-German team of students.

Having been formally registered as a CO by a tribunal, he joined the Friends' Ambulance Unit (FAU) and was sent to Finland. This unit operated on the Karelian front of the Winter War and in the Norwegian campaign. They escaped the Nazis via Sweden and Iceland. Davis served in London in the 'Blitz' winter of 1940–1941.

He was sent in March 1941 to Egypt via the Cape of Good Hope to reinforce the FAU detachment in Greece, but this had been captured by the Nazis before he could join, so his unit was sent to Syria to work at the Hadfield-Spears Mobile Hospital, an Anglo-French entity attached to the Free French Forces. A stay of a month in Cairo allowed Davis to view the city's mosques (with Michael Rowntree) and produce a book on the subject (see list of works below). As the mobile hospital moved through Syria and Lebanon and then along the desert to Tunisia, and eventually to Italy and southern France, Davis visited (and wrote up in his copious notebooks) such places as Baalbek, Byblos, Damascus, Krak des Chevaliers, Beaufort, Leptis Magna and El Djem. He ran the hospital laundry. By 1944, his FAU unit had reached France, and he participated in the liberation of that country. He came home for demobilisation with the Croix de Guerre (oddly for a pacifist!) for his contribution to the Free French war effort.

=== Post-war years, 1945–1956 ===
Davis re-entered Balliol College in 1945 and achieved a first class degree in Modern History, followed in 1947 by the MA allowed him by his seniority and war service. He started to organise social events such as a tour of Blenheim Palace conducted by John Betjeman.

From 1947 to 1948 Davis was an assistant history master at Christ's Hospital, Horsham, as a junior colleague of David Roberts. Perhaps the lowly nature of this post was an expression of prejudice against conscientious objectors. Anyway, during that year he learnt that he was a born teacher, even a quintessential schoolmaster.

In 1948 Davis accepted the offer from Sir John Neale (perhaps advised by Galbraith) of an assistant lectureship at University College London (UCL). Research now became an essential part of his work. He found a small flat in Pimlico and (characteristically) bicycled to work. Here he met and fell in love with Eleanor Megaw, who had been an officer in the WRNS and was now, since 1946, a tutor to women students at UCL. She came from Northern Ireland, and had a Unionist and a Home Ruler as grandfathers. They were married on 17 September 1949 and found a house in a quiet part of Highgate. Davis booked Cumberland Lodge in Windsor Great Park for a weekend just before the start of the academic year so that history freshers and other students and staff could get to know one another. This started a tradition that is still maintained (as of 1992). During the UCL years, his two sons were born: Christopher (1952) and Timothy (1955).

Davis wrote a paper on the buildings of Balliol College, which was published in the Victoria County History of Oxfordshire in 1954. In 1955, a paper of his advocating the Anglo-Saxon origin of soke and sokemen appeared in the Transactions of the Royal Historical Society (3rd series, 5).

During the early years of their marriage, Davis and his wife were able to holiday in Greece, taking advantage of the fact that she had an uncle who lived near Athens. This allowed Davis to learn about mediaeval Greece at first hand by for example sojourning among the monasteries of Mount Athos travelling on a mule escorted by the Mount Athos policeman.

=== The Merton years, 1956–1970 ===
In 1956 Merton College, Oxford elected Davis a fellow and tutor in modern history, with the support of Vivian Galbraith, and he held that post for 14 years.

His A History of Medieval Europe: From Constantine to Saint Louis (see list of works below), which he had started while still at UCL, came out in 1957. It was part of a series designed for use in universities and better-equipped schools. It was still in print as of 2006 and has been a very successful textbook. Ten years later, Davis's King Stephen, 1135–1154 (see also below) appeared in print.

In 1968 Regesta Regum Anglo-Normannorum, volume 3 came out – edited by H. A. Cronne and Davis (these brought together by Vivian Galbraith), a major work of scholarship on King Stephen's reign. This set of volumes had been conceived by Davis's father, who had also produced (with the help R. J. Whitwell and others) volume i in 1913 – but it had been subjected to a typical devastating review by J. H. Round. Davis variously published a number of points contradicting Round's views, suggesting a loyal son's rejoinder to the scholar who had wounded his father. Volume ii, a collaboration of Cronne and Charles Johnson, had come out in 1956. Volume iv came out later. Ralph Davis was the main editor for volumes iii and iv.

1976 saw the appearance of a book in gestation since 1966 or before on the Normans and their myth (see list of works below). This argued that the Normans were rather good at propaganda, of which they were in some respects themselves the victims. Other papers appeared around this time on authorship of various sources including the Anglo-Saxon Chronicle.

At Merton, Davis was tutor for admissions and introduced the practice of electing a 'schoolmaster fellow'. He taught and lectured on a variety of topics. His tutoring was accompanied by hospitality at the family home at Lathbury Road in North Oxford. He was Sub-warden 1966–1968. It is said of him that "he was a man of great moral seriousness, and didn't always bother to hide his contempt for those he thought impelled by self-interest, cowardice or just mental laziness" (Barrow, page 391). He was never unreservedly an Oxford 'college man'. However, he was a keen cyclist, typical of an Oxford don.

=== The Birmingham years, 1970–1984 ===
In 1970 Davis became Professor of Mediaeval History at the University of Birmingham (UK), heading the History Department there in succession to H. A. Cronne. This gave him the opportunity to express his missionary-like belief in the study of history as an intellectual discipline. He applied a firm but friendly hand to the project of restoring the well-being of the department after the troubled 'interregnum' following Cronne's illness. The usual hospitality was extended by Davis and his wife, especially to newly appointed and junior members of staff. They continued for many years their habit of inviting students into their own home.

Davis attached no great importance to formal syllabuses and course structures. He was much more interested in the contact between teacher and student, and brought in a system of fortnightly undergraduate essays which has persisted for a long time. There were fortnightly tutorials and weekly seminars, all supplemented by lectures. Postgraduate research was, surprisingly, not a high priority although he encouraged his younger colleagues in research, and pursued his own research with vigour and distinction.

Davis set up regular meetings of 'Midlands Mediaevalists'. All mediaevalists at Bristol, Keele, Leicester and Nottingham universities were invited to an annual lecture and dinner.

In this general period, Davis produced papers on the beginnings of municipal liberties in Oxford (1968, Oxoniensia, xxxiii), Coventry in Stephen's reign (1971, English Historical Review, lxxxvi, 533-47).

=== Retirement, 1984–1991 ===
Davis retired in 1984 and moved to North Oxford. He was elected Emeritus Fellow of Merton College. He kept active in his retirement despite a repair that had to be made to his aorta in 1987.

Through his wife Eleanor, he had come to know much about Ireland and especially Northern Ireland. She came from the Protestant plantation community of Ulster, originating largely in south-western Scotland. Presumably because of this knowledge, Davis was in 1985 induced by Sir David Wills into a project in historical education, to be financed by the Wills Trust, to encourage better understanding between the Republic of Ireland and Northern Ireland, and presumably between Catholics and Protestants in the North. Davis recruited teachers, school inspectors and academics to serve on a committee to frame a curriculum of Irish history which would be acceptable to schools in both North and South. The committee oversaw the writing of the Questions in Irish History series of history books. The Teaching of History Trust has continued to work long afterwards, sponsored by Longman. The first volumes of the series are dedicated to Ralph Davis' memory. He was still actively working for peace in Northern Ireland when he died.

Davis also published a work on warhorses in 1989, having worked on the project since before his retirement. A paper on the mediaeval warhorse had appeared in 1983 in F. M. L. Thompson (ed.), Horses in European Economic History: a preliminary canter. Another on the same topic was read at a Battle Conference in 1987 (From Alfred the Great to Stephen, pp. 63–78).

A tribute was made to him on his 67th birthday in the form of a Festschrift, a compilation of articles edited by Henry Mayr-Harting and Robert I. Moore. There were 22 contributors, and it was subscribed by 122 friends.

Davis had planned a volume of collected papers, From Alfred the Great to Stephen, but it remained incomplete on his death and had to be published with some omissions and errors. It includes his last word on an academic controversy over the role of Geoffrey de Mandeville in King Stephen's reign, on which a number of papers and counter-papers had been written.

Davis was taken seriously ill in early March 1991 as he was about to set off for Dorset to fulfil a speaking engagement. He was rushed to hospital but did not recover, dying on 12 March. A funeral service was held on 18 March and a memorial service in the chapel of Merton College followed on 1 June, at which an address was given by Prof. Rees Davies, FBA. He left a wife, Eleanor, and two sons.

=== Extra-curricular activities ===
Davis was an active member of the Historical Association from his early days at UCL. He edited History magazine for the Association from 1968 to 1978, and he was its president from 1979 to 1982. He was a very active president, visiting many branches and campaigning for the teaching of history in schools and universities and founding the History at the Universities Defence Group (HUDG). In 1981, he and Eleanor were guests at a party attended by Queen Elizabeth II to celebrate the Association's 75th year.

He was a Fellow of the Royal Historical Society (from 1954), but was never as active for them as he had been for the HA. Nevertheless, he published work in both the Transactions and the Campden Series, served on the council (1964–1967) and was vice-president (1974–1977).

He was also a Fellow of the Society of Antiquaries (from 1948), but was never prominent in its administration.

He was much more active in the British Academy, being elected in 1975 and serving on the council from 1979 to 1982, and as chairman of Section 2 from 1986 to 1989.

During the Birmingham years, Davis became a lecturer for Swan's Hellenic Tours. For Mr Swan and the Historical Association, he presided in 1981 over a tour of the pilgrim route to Santiago de Compostela.

== Works ==
=== Main works ===
- A History of Medieval Europe: From Constantine to Saint Louis, 1957, (3rd Ed. revised by Robert I. Moore, ISBN 0-582-78462-X, 2005) – reissued many times
- King Stephen, 1135–1154 (University of California Press, 1967) (ISBN 0-582-04000-0, 1990)
- Regesta Regum Anglo-Normannorum volume iii (joint editor with H. A. Cronne), 1968
- Regesta Regum Anglo-Normannorum volume iv (joint editor with H. A. Cronne), 1969
- The Normans and Their Myth (Thames & Hudson, 1976 (ISBN 0-500-27181-X, 1980) – a little book dealing with the identity of the Normans and their self-myth
- The Medieval Warhorse: Origin, Development and Redevelopment, 1989 (ISBN 0-500-25102-9)
- From Alfred the Great to Stephen (author and editor) (A&C Black, 1991) (ISBN 1-85285-045-0) – 22 of his own essays on late Anglo-Saxon and Norman history

=== Other works ===
- A Catalogue of Mason's Marks as an aid to Architectural History, 1954, published in the Journal of the British Archaeological Association, 3rd series, xvii, pp. 43–76
- The Mosques of Cairo, 1941 (no ISBN)
- The Kalendar of Abbot Samson of Bury St. Edmunds and Related Documents (London: Royal Historical Society, 1954) Royal Historical Society, Camden Third Series, lxxxiv (ISBN 0-86193-084-3) – Latin
- Medieval European History 395–1500: A Select Bibliography (London: Historical Association, 1963) (no ISBN) – 44-page pamphlet; Historical Association's "Helps for Students of History" series, no. 67
- The Early Middle Ages (editor) (Routledge & K. Paul, 1964) (ISBN 8843449974) – English History in Pictures series
- The Investiture Contest(with Eric John (audio cassette) (Sussex Tapes, 1971) (ISBN 1-86013-121-2)
- Gesta Stephani, translated by K.R. Potter (with Kenneth Reginald Potter) (Clarendon Press, 1976) (ISBN 0-19-822234-3)
- The Early History of Coventry (Oxford University Press, 1976) (ISBN 0-85220-050-1) – Dugdale Society Occasional Papers, no. 24
- The Writing of History in the Middle Ages: Essays Presented to Richard William Southern (joint editor) (Clarendon Press, 1981) (ISBN 0-19-822556-3) – 17 essays
- David Charles Douglas, 1898–1982, 1985 (ISBN 0-85672-501-3) – 30 pages
- Studies in Mediaeval History: Presented to R. H. C. Davis (recipient) (Bloomsbury Press, 1985) (ISBN 0-907628-68-0)
- Blackwell Dictionary of Historians (joint editor with John Cannon, William Doyle, and Jack P. Greene) (Wiley: 1988) (ISBN 0-631-14708-X)
- The Gesta Guillelmi of William of Poitiers (joint editor) (Clarendon Press, 1998) (ISBN 0-19-820553-8) – first-hand account of William the Conqueror's reign by his chaplain William of Poitiers

The lists above are complete as regards books, although not as regards other media such as papers and pamphlets.

== See also ==
- List of historians
