= 66 Banbury Road, Oxford =

Victorian house in North Oxford, England

Coordinates: 51.7647°N 1.2603°W

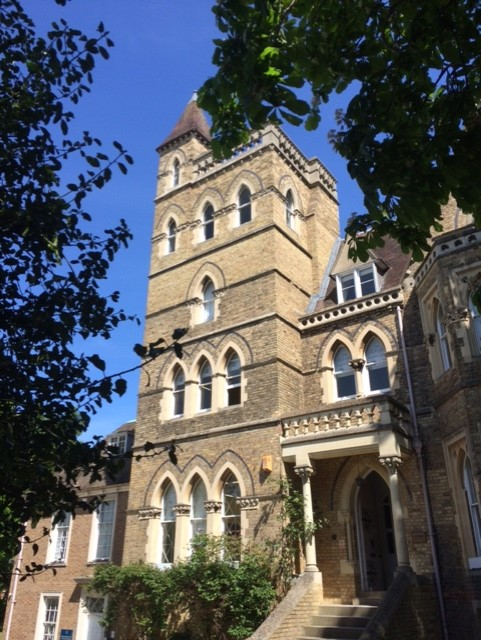
Front façade of 66 Banbury Road

66 Banbury Road is a detached Victorian villa in North Oxford built in 1869 by Frederick Codd. The villa is one of the largest structures in the suburb and is particularly distinctive due to its prominent location at the corner of Banbury and Norham Roads, as well as its tall 6-story Italianate tower, which is a local landmark.

== History ==
Originally named 'St Catherine's', the house, which sits in a one-acre plot, was first leased to Mrs Catherine Fry in 1874. Mrs Fry occupied the house from its construction to 1894. Early 20th-century residents included Dr and Mrs A.A. Prankerd of Manchester College.

In 1930, Wolsey Hall, Oxford, acquired No.66 and operated its home tutoring business from the site. This marked the end of the building's residential use and its permanent transition to institutional purposes. As of 2019, No.66 is home to the Oxford English Centre and the University of Oxford Institute of Population Ageing.

In 2008, No.66 was designated a Grade II listed building.
