= R. I. Moore =

British historian (1941–2025)

R. I. Moore FRHistS
- Born: Robert Ian Moore; 8 May 1941; Enniskillen, Northern Ireland
- Died: 5 February 2025 (aged 83); Newcastle, England
- Other name: Bob Moore
- Spouse: Elizabeth Redgate

Academic background
- Education: Merton College, Oxford

Academic work
- Discipline: History
- Sub-discipline: Medieval history
- Institutions: University of Sheffield; Newcastle University
- Main interests: History of heresy; comparative world history
- Website: rimoore.net

Robert Ian Moore FRHistS (8 May 1941 – 5 February 2025) was a British historian and Professor Emeritus of History at Newcastle University. He specialised in medieval history and authored several influential works on heresy. Moore was a pioneer in the UK in teaching world history to undergraduates, published numerous papers on comparative world history, and served as series editor of the Blackwell History of the World. In 2007, his book The Formation of a Persecuting Society was described by the Guardian as "one of the most influential and controversial books of medieval history of the last 20 years".

== Biography ==
Moore was born in Enniskillen, Northern Ireland, on 8 May 1941. He studied at Merton College, Oxford, from which he received a Bachelor of Arts degree in 1962 and a Master of Arts degree in 1966. From 1964 to 1994 he taught medieval and world history at the University of Sheffield, before moving to the Newcastle University, where he remained until 2003. He was a visiting professor at the University of Chicago in 1989 and the University of California at Berkeley in 2004. Moore died after a long illness on 5 February 2025, at the age of 83.

== Selected works ==
=== Books ===
- The Birth of Popular Heresy (1975)
- The Origins of European Dissent (1st 1977, revised 1985)
- The First European Revolution, c. 970–1215 (2000)
- Studies in Medieval History Presented to R. H. C. Davis, eds. Henry Mayr-Harting and Moore (Hambledon Press, 1985)
- The Formation of a Persecuting Society: Power and Deviance in Western Europe, 950–1250 (Blackwell Publishing, 1987); Expanded edition, The Formation of a Persecuting Society: Authority and Deviance in Western Europe, 950–1250 (Blackwell, 2007)
- 3rd. edition of R.H.C.Davis, A History of Medieval Europe: from Constantine to Saint Louis, (Pearson Longman, 2005, ISBN 0-582-78462-X) (1st ed. by Ralph Henry Carless Davis, Longman, 1957; 2nd ed. by Davis, 1970)
- The War on Heresy: the Battle for Faith and Power in Medieval Europe (Profile Books, 2012); US title, The War on Heresy (Harvard, 2012)

=== Historical atlas edited ===
- The Hamlyn Historical Atlas (London: Hamlyn, 1961; revised 1981): US title, Rand McNally Atlas of World History (Chicago: Rand McNally, 1981; revised 1983). Associate editors, Maps copyright Creative Cartography, Hamlyn, and Rand McNally.
- The Newnes Historical Atlas (Newnes Books, 1983)
- Philip's Atlas of World History (George Philip and Son, 1992)

=== Papers ===
- Family, Community and Cult on the Eve of the Gregorian Reform', Transactions of the Royal Historical Society, 5th series, 30 (1980), 49–69.
- 'Guibert of Nogent and his World,' in Studies in Medieval History Presented to R.H.C. Davis ed. Henry Mayr-Harting and R.I. Moore (London, 1985), 107-117.
- 'Antisemitism and the Birth of Europe', Studies in Church History ed. Diana Wood, 29, Christianity and Judaism, (Oxford, 1992), 33 – 57.
- 'Heresy and the Making of Literacy, c. 1000 – 1150', Peter Biller and Anne Hudson eds., Heresy and Literacy in the Middle Ages (Cambridge University Press, 1994), pp. 19 – 37, reprinted in Lester K. Little and Barbara H. Rosenwein eds., Debating the Middle Ages (Oxford 1998), pp. 363–75
- 'Heresy, Repression and Social Change in the Age of Gregorian Reform', in Medieval Christendom and Its Discontents, ed. Scott J. Waugh (Cambridge University Press, 1996), pp. 19 – 46.
- (in French) 'A la naissance d'une société persécutrice: les clercs, les Cathares et la formation de l'Europe', in Le Catharisme,: un ordre condamné: Centre nationale d'études cathares, 6e. session d'histoire médiévale, September 1993 (Carcassonne, 1996), pp. 11 – 37
- 'Between Sanctity and Superstition: Saints and their Miracles in the Age of Revolution', in The Work of Jacques Le Goff, and the Challenges of Medieval History ed. Miri Rubin (Boydell Press, Woodbridge, 1997), pp. 63 – 75
- 'World History' in Michael Bentley (ed.) Companion to Historiography (London, Routledge, 1997), pp. 941 – 59
- 'The Birth of Europe as a Eurasian Phenomenon', Modern Asian Studies 31/3 (1997), pp. 583 – 601, reprinted in V. Lieberman, ed., Beyond Binary Histories: Re-imagining Eurasia to c. 1830 (Ann Arbor, 1999), pp. 139–59

== Fellowships ==
- Royal Historical Society (1975)
- Royal Asiatic Society (1992)
- Institute for Advanced Study, Indiana University (1995)
- Medieval Academy of America (2002)
