= William Esson =

British mathematician

- Born: 1838; Dundee, Scotland
- Died: 28 August 1916 (aged 78); Abingdon, England
- Education: St John's College, Oxford
- Known for: Mathematics of the rate of chemical change
- Scientific career
- Workplaces: University of Oxford

William Esson, FRS (17 May 1838 – 28 August 1916) was a British mathematician.

== Early life ==
He was born in Carnoustie, Scotland.

Esson attended St John's College, Oxford.

== Career ==
He then became a Fellow of Merton College. In 1892, he became the Savilian Professor of Geometry at the University of Oxford, based at New College. He worked on problems in chemistry with Augustus George Vernon Harcourt.

In 1869 he was elected a Fellow of the Royal Society and in 1895 delivered, jointly with Harcourt, their Bakerian Lecture on the Laws of Connexion between the Conditions of a Chemical Change and its Amount. III. Further Researches on the Reaction of Hydrogen Dioxide and Hydrogen Iodide.

He was on the governing body of Abingdon School until 1900.

== Personal life ==
In 1874, Esson leased 13 Bradmore Road in North Oxford. He died in Abingdon, England.
