= Henri Fluchère =

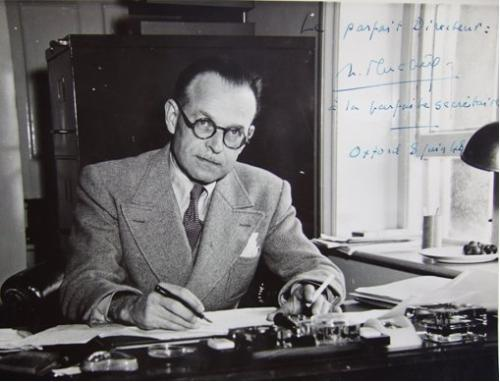
Henri Fluchère at the MFO in 1948

Henri Fluchère (18 November 1898 – 20 July 1987) was a chairman of the Société Française Shakespeare and a notable literary critic.

== Life ==
Born in Sainte-Tulle, the son of a broker, Fluchère completed his baccalaureate in philosophy in 1915 and began university study in Paris before being conscripted into the army. After the end of World War I he returned to his studies at the Sorbonne, obtaining his degree in arts (English) in 1920, followed by a higher education diploma the next year and the English agrégation in 1924. From 1921 to 1925 he was a lecturer at Gonville and Caius College, Cambridge, where he became acquainted with the literary critic F. R. Leavis and poet T. S. Eliot, later translating several of the latter's works into French. His friendship with Leavis enabled him to remain in contact with academic life at Cambridge even after leaving the university, and in the 1930s he became a contributor to Leavis's journal Scrutiny.

Upon returning to France, Fluchère taught English at his alma mater, Lycée Thiers in Marseille, a position he held until 1942. During the 1930s he became interested in avant-garde theatre, establishing the company Le Rideau gris in Marseille with Louis Ducreux. He translated many of the works of his friend Jean Giono during this time, including The Song of the World (1937) and Harvest (1938) for Viking Press. In 1939, he introduced Henry Miller to Giono; the three remained friends for years afterwards.

During World War II Fluchère worked as a translator, before joining the Resistance and going undercover in Provence. In October 1946, he was appointed president of the newly created Maison Française d'Oxford (MFO), remaining in situ until 1963. During this period, he promoted the works of T. S. Eliot, Henry Miller, Aldous Huxley, D. H. Lawrence, T. F. Powys, Cyril Tourneur (whom he translated), and began the edition of Shakespeare's works for the Bibliothèque de la Pléiade, which he completed in 1959. From the late 1940s to the late 1950s he was a local politician as well as a scholar, serving as a councillor for the (socialist) SFIO in both Manosque and Sainte-Tulle.

Fluchère also played an important role in the establishment of an Elizabethan research centre in Aix-en-Provence, and was responsible for the libretto in Darius Milhaud's L'opéra du gueux, Op. 171 (1937), a ballad opera in three acts. In 1966 his Laurence Sterne: From Tristram to Yorick, originally in French, won the Scott Moncrieff Prize for its translation by Barbara Bray.

== Henri André Fluchère ==
Fluchère's nephew Henri André Fluchère (1914–1990) was the author of the Golden Guide volume on wines, and illustrated other Golden Guides. He was an illustrator of science and other technical textbooks, and wrote books on art, especially watercolor. He was a registered heraldic illustrator with various museums in New York City. He immigrated to the US in 1925. He enlisted in the US Army before World War II in Military Intelligence as an Interpreter (French) as a master sergeant with the 28th Infantry Division. After the 28th Infantry Division crossed the Rhine River into Germany, his services were no longer needed and he was reassigned to the Stars and Stripes newspaper in Paris as an illustrator and artist. After returning from World War II, he worked for Superman magazine as an illustrator. In the 1950s he was art director for McGraw Hill in their textbook division. In the late 1950s he established Art Tech Services, in Irvington, New York, where he lived and raised his family.

== Bibliography ==
- Fluchère, Henri. "Défense de la Lucidité." In T. S. Eliot: A Symposium, edited by Richard March and Tambimuttu. T. S. Eliot: A Symposium. London: Editions Poetry, 1948.
- Maguin, Jean-Marie. "Shakespeare Studies in France since 1960." Internet Shakespeare Editions. May 2002. (Retrieved 2010-09-20).
