= Brian Ring =

British architect

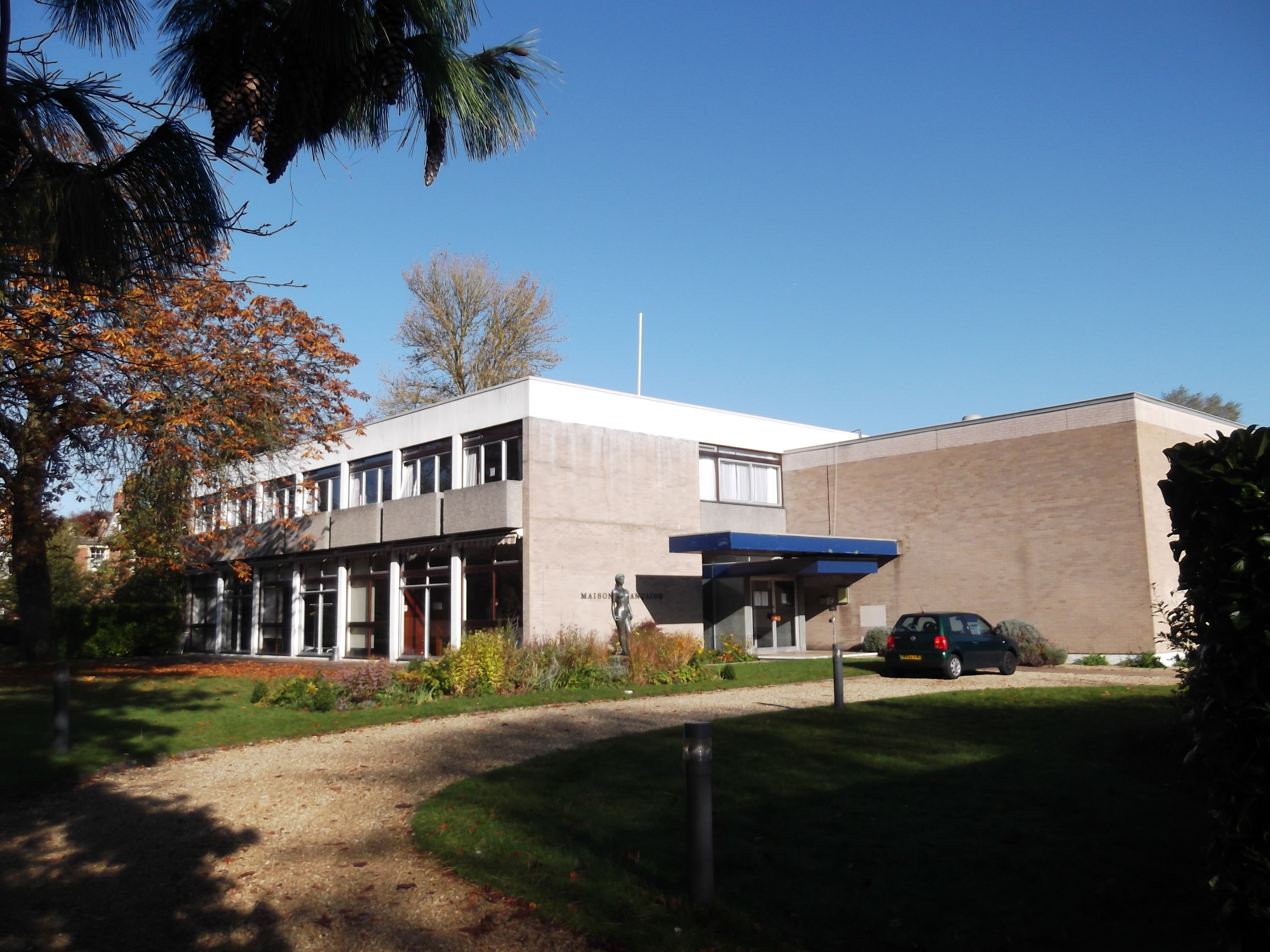
The Maison Française d'Oxford building in Oxford, designed by Jacques Laurent and Brian Ring, Howard & Partners during the early 1960s.

Brian Ring is a 20th-century British architect.

Ring was trained in architecture in London (England) and Paris (France). He founded his practice (Brian Ring, Howard & Partners) in London in 1958. The practice was engaged in general commercial and residential projects throughout the United Kingdom as well as acting for the French Ministry of Education and the French Ministry of Foreign Affairs on projects in the UK. In 1969, Ring formed a development consultancy specializing in the planning and development management of hotels, hospitals, and schools, often in collaboration with the international engineering consultants, CONSECO International, of which he was a joint founder.

Among major projects in which Ring has been involved were the planning of a university hospital in Jordan, the planning of a burns and trauma unit in Kuwait, a comprehensive audit of the total healthcare facilities in Mauritius, and the planning and development management of a number of hotels in Spain. Before retiring from active practice in 2000, Ring was engaged in a number of commercial real estate ventures in France.

The Maison Française d'Oxford is a French research institute based at 2–10 Norham Road in Oxford, designed by Jacques Laurent with Brian Ring, Howard & Partners during the early 1960s.
