= Wolsey Hall, Oxford =

Wolsey Hall Oxford
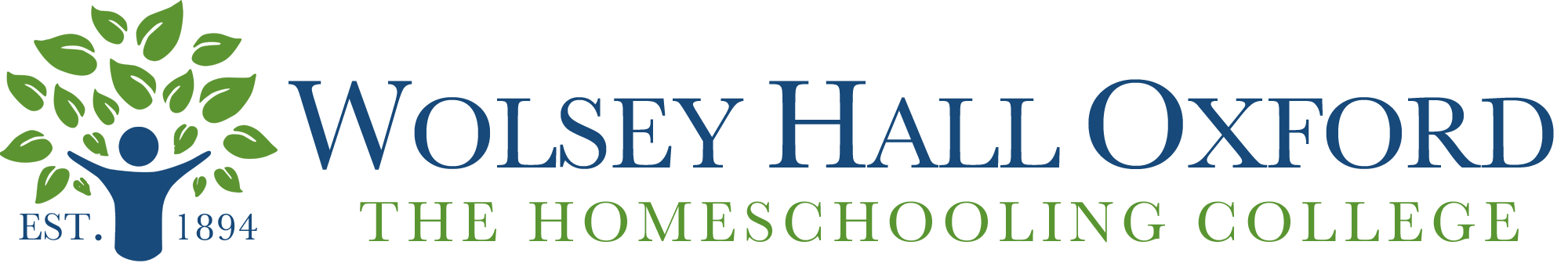

Location
- Midland House, West Way; Oxford, Oxfordshire, OX2 0PH; England

Information
- Type: Private school
- Established: 1894
- Founder: Joseph William Knipe
- Principal: Gavin McLean MA (Hons)
- Website: wolseyhalloxford.org.uk

Founded in 1894, Wolsey Hall Oxford is one of the longest established homeschooling colleges in the world offering courses in primary, secondary, IGCSE and A level subjects to homeschoolers in more than 120 countries. Based in Oxford, England, Wolsey Hall is a registered online school of Cambridge Assessment International Education.

== Teaching methods ==
Wolsey Hall Oxford is a virtual college with no walls, or a Virtual Learning Environment (VLE).

== History of Wolsey Hall, Oxford ==
Wolsey Hall Oxford was founded in 1894.

Wolsey Hall occupied premises in St Aldates, Oxford from 1907, moving to 66 Banbury Road, Oxford in 1930.

In 1942, Wolsey Hall was appointed by the War Office to provide courses for the armed forces, and during the remaining war years it was a key supplier of courses to members of the British Armed Services.

During the 1930s–1980s, Wolsey Hall Oxford served as a provider of degree-level courses via the University of London external degree programme.

After the war, demand for courses, especially GCE 'O' and 'A' levels and the external degrees of London University, continued to grow. A number of the original typed lesson notes and test prompts from the 1949/1950 London B.Sc. Econ. degree are held in the Magdalen College, University of Oxford, Library Archive. That was the period too when Wolsey Hall went truly international and there was a great growth in numbers of students studying from outside the UK, from countries such as Hong Kong, Malaysia, Singapore, Kenya, Nigeria, Canada, Ghana, Guyana, Mauritius, and Jamaica.

Many years later Wolsey Hall Oxford launched a distance learning MBA in 1985 with Warwick Business School. In the 1990s the college built on this experience and provided management development courses to a variety of blue chip organisations including British Airways.

Wolsey Hall Oxford is considered as the pioneer in the field of correspondence degrees later entered by the Open University.

== Principals of Wolsey Hall Oxford ==
Percy Knipe - 1945

Ernest W. Shaw-Fletcher CBE - 1952

Wyndham Milligan - 1968

John Coffey - 1990

Lee Wilcock 2009–2023

Gavin McLean 2023–present

== Notable Wolsey Hall Oxford students ==
Nelson Mandela – anti-apartheid activist, politician, philanthropist, human rights advocate. Mandela studied for his London University Law degree through a correspondence course with Wolsey Hall Oxford during his incarceration in Robben Island jail. The difficulty of obtaining his course materials in prison is evident in the letter from Nelson Mandela to his lawyer, Bram Fischer.

S.R. Nathan – President of Singapore, September 1999 – August 2011. As a means to confront his lack of a more advanced formal education, Nathan enrolled on a course with Wolsey Hall Oxford which he mentions in his autobiography, An Unexpected Journey: Path to the Presidency. He would rise at 4 am every day and study for three hours before going into the office for a full day's work, followed by dealing with trade union matters. He would be back in bed by 8.30 pm in order to restart his studies the next morning.

Amelie Morgan - Olympic Gymnast. Amelie homeschooled with Wolsey Hall Oxford for her IGCSE subjects in order to allow more time for her gymnastics training and competing. At the 2020 Olympic games in Tokyo Amelie was part of the GB team that won the bronze medal. This was an historic achievement as it was the first medal by the GB women's team in 93 years.

George Chambers - The second post-independence Prime Minister of Trinidad and Tobago. Coming from lower middle-class origins and an early position as a legal clerk, Chambers' education included a GCE correspondence course with Wolsey Hall Oxford.

Sir Harold Evans - British-born journalist and writer and editor of The Sunday Times from 1967 to 1981. Evans studied economics with Wolsey Hall Oxford whilst an RAF airman at the end of WW2. He mentions his association with the college in his autobiographical book My Paper Chase – True Stories of Vanished Times.

Ernest Cole - anti-Apartheid photographer. His innovative photography served to question authority during the apartheid era in South Africa with his images still serving as a powerful reminder and archive to the present day. Cole had hoped to become a doctor, but found he could never realize his dreams with the introduction of a segregation law that restricted education for black South Africans. Cole terminated his school studies at sixteen and instead completed a course through Wolsey Hall Oxford via distance learning.

Joe Lartey - celebrated Ghanaian sports commentator popularly known as 'Over to you Joe Lartey'. After the war Joe was discharged from the army and started a job as a clerk at the Accra Town Council. A well disciplined man after his time in the army he pursued a course via distance learning with Wolsey Hall Oxford to prepare for the Cambridge Certificate (O’Level) which eventually led to him pursuing a short career in teaching. In 1961 he joined GBC and soon afterwards he joined the sports department where his career flourished alongside the other great commentator Festus Addae

Matthew Tawo Mbu - Nigerian lawyer, politician (Foreign Minister of Nigeria) and diplomat. He became a Minister at the age of 23. His early education was at various Roman Catholic mission schools in Boki LGA, then Wolsey Hall Oxford (postal tuition), University College London and the Middle Temple, London.

David Martin (sociologist) – Sociologist and emeritus Professor of Sociology at the London School of Economics. Martin enrolled in the Wolsey Hall Oxford, London University external degree course in economics as a first step in his journey to becoming a sociologist which he mentions in his autobiography, The Education of David Martin: The making of an unlikely sociologist.

Emmanuel Afe Babalola - Nigerian lawyer, Senior Advocate of Nigeria and founder of Afe Babalola University. Emmanuel Afe Babalola began life in poverty and for all his youth and early adulthood lived in poverty. Under these difficult circumstances, he enrolled for the Senior Cambridge School Certificate examination by private study with Wolsey Hall Oxford which was the stepping stone he needed to begin his journey to become a lawyer.

Rev. Prof. Allen Brent - scholar of early Christian history and literature and Fellow of St Edmund's College, Cambridge. Brent left Grammar School at the age of 16, in 1957, with only three '0' levels in English Language, English Literature, and Religious Knowledge. Shortly after leaving school he developed an interest in Latin, Greek, Hebrew and Religious Knowledge, pursuing these initially through evening classes and via correspondence courses with Wolsey Hall Oxford.

Canon William Purcell - writer, BBC broadcaster and Canon of Worcester Cathedral. After an unhappy time as an advertising copywriter, Purcell took a correspondence course with Wolsey Hall Oxford which enabled him to enter Cardiff University to read English in 1931. In 1934 he went on to Keble College, Oxford, to read English, before going on to theological college in Birmingham.

Hansi Kennedy - pre-eminent child psychoanalyst, whose career began with Anna Freud in the Hampstead War Nurseries and continued at the Hampstead Child Therapy Clinic. Despite her very full life in the war nurseries during the war, Hansi found time to study Maths, Biology, German and English through Wolsey Hall Oxford.

Chief (Dr) Kolawole Balogun – Nigerian politician and member of The National Council of Nigeria and the Cameroons (NCNC), which was a Nigerian political party from 1944 to 1966, during the period leading up to independence and immediately following independence. After his success in the London Matriculation Examination, Kola Balogun registered for the Intermediate Bachelor of Laws as an external student of the University of London as a correspondence student of Wolsey Hall Oxford.

Franklin C.O. Coker - the first president of the Institute of Chartered Accountants of Nigeria. Coker registered to study commerce at the University of London via postal tutorials from Wolsey Hall Oxford.

Sir Satcam Boolell - Deputy Prime Minister, Mauritius 1986–1990, Attorney General and Minister of Justice and Minister of External Affairs and Emigration of Mauritius. High Commissioner in London from 1996 to 2000. He was born in the village of New Grove and attended the primary school of the locality. In those difficult times, when education was the preserve of the privileged few, he privately educated himself, with correspondence courses from Wolsey Hall Oxford and private tuition, obtaining the London Matriculation in 1942 and an intermediate BSc in economics in 1945.
