= Frederick Codd =

British Gothic Revival architect and speculative builder

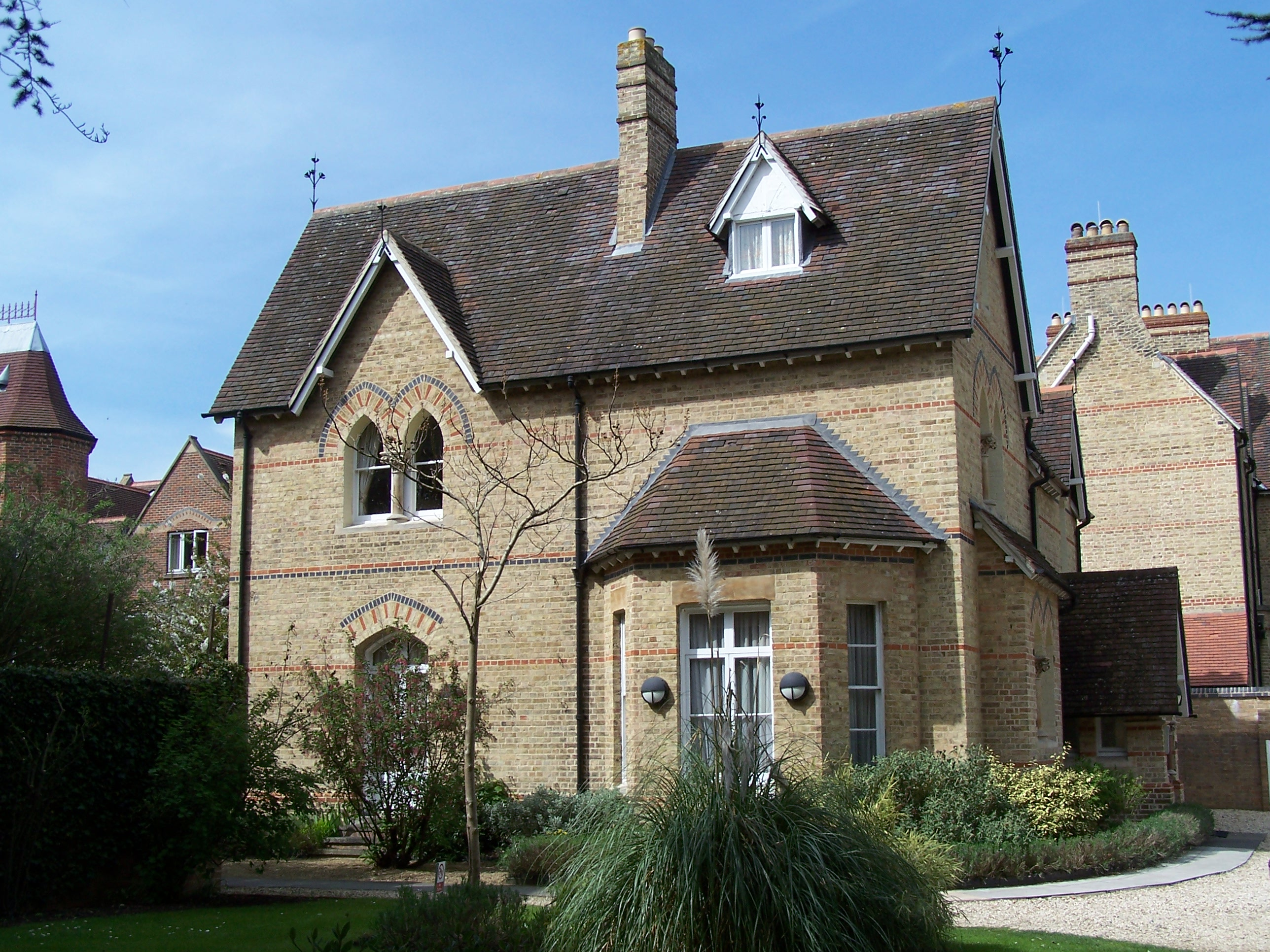
- 37 Banbury Road, St Anne's College, a typical Victorian Gothic North Oxford house, designed by Frederick Codd in 1866.
- Born: 17 July 1831; East Dereham, Norfolk, England
- Died: 19 October 1888 (aged 57)
- Occupation: Architect
- Buildings: The Oxford English Centre (66 Banbury Road,1869); Wycliffe Hall, Oxford (52 Banbury Road, 1870); Norham Manor Estate, Oxford

Frederick Codd (17 July 1831 – 19 October 1888) was a British Gothic Revival architect and speculative builder who designed and built many Victorian houses in North Oxford, England.

Codd was born in 1831 in East Dereham in Norfolk, the sixth son of Charles Codd, a minister, and his wife, Susan Ann Howes. He was baptised on his first birthday. He was initially based in London but he was active in Oxford by 1865.

He was a pupil of William Wilkinson, another North Oxford architect, and their styles are similar. He designed houses on the west side of Banbury Road, in Bradmore Road, Canterbury Road, Crick Road and Norham Gardens (including Gunfield), amongst other locations.

In central Oxford, Codd designed shops and offices in King Edward Street south of the High Street during 1871–75 for Oriel College. He is also involved in the rebuilding of Queen Street during 1875–78.

Woodperry House in Oxfordshire was enlarged in 1879–80 when the porch and two pedimented wings were added, designed by Codd, then an assistant of Sir Thomas Jackson. He lost the competition to build the Oxford High School for Boys in George Street to Jackson.

In Oxford, Codd initially lived in Cowley Road. Later, in 1867, he moved to a semi-detached villa of his own design at 39 Banbury Road, on the corner with Bevington Road. In September 1876, Codd was forced into liquidation due to difficulty in selling large houses in Canterbury Road, with debts to the Oxford and Abingdon Building Society.

Codd succeeded Samuel Lipscomb Seckham as the City Surveyor in Oxford.

== See also ==
- List of Oxford architects

== Sources ==
- Hinchcliffe, Tanis (1992). North Oxford. New Haven & London: Yale University Press. pp. 52, 55–56, 58, 87, 106–109, 112, 151, 180, 210, 248. ISBN 0-14-071045-0.
- Sherwood, Jennifer; Pevsner, Nikolaus (1974). The Buildings of England: Oxfordshire. Harmondsworth: Penguin Books. pp. 57, 309, 318–320, 611, 854. ISBN 0-14-071045-0.
- Tyack, Geoffrey (1998). Oxford: An Architectural Guide. Oxford & New York: Oxford University Press. pp. 236, 244. ISBN 0-19-817423-3.
