= Norham Gardens =

Road in North Oxford, England

Coordinates: 51.76346°N 1.25678°W

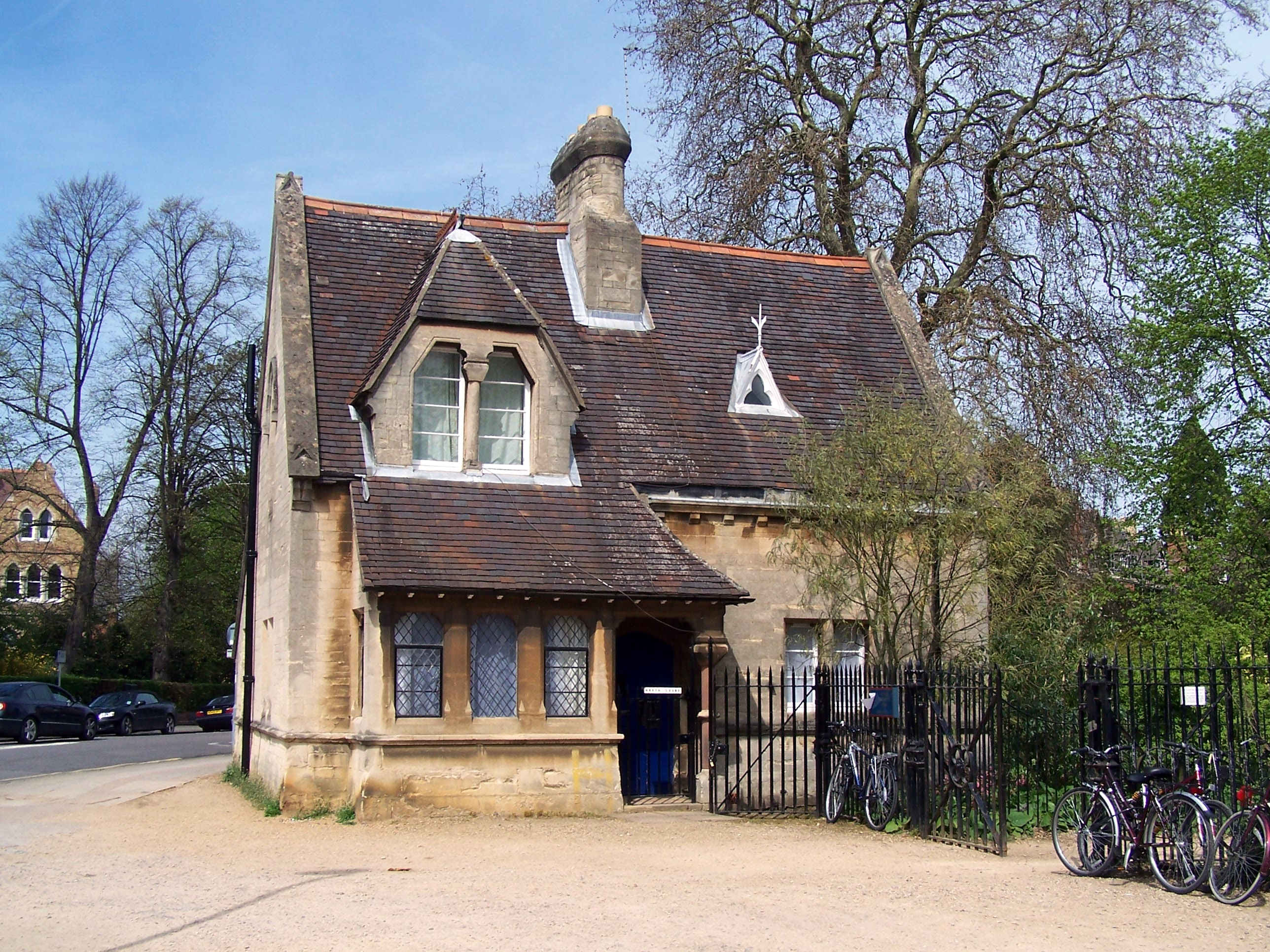
North Lodge, at the entrance to the University Parks where Norham Gardens meets Parks Road.

Norham Gardens is a residential road in central North Oxford, England. It adjoins the north end of Parks Road near the junction with Banbury Road, directly opposite St Anne's College. From here it skirts the north side of the Oxford University Parks, ending up at Lady Margaret Hall, a college of Oxford University that was formerly for women only, backing onto the River Cherwell. Public access to the Parks is available from the two ends of the road. To the north of the road are Bradmore Road near the western end and Fyfield Road near the eastern end.

A number of houses in Norham Gardens are now used by the University of Oxford (mainly the Department of Education) and its colleges. St Edmund Hall's Graduate Centre is housed in several buildings on this road. One house, previously run by the Society of the Sacred Heart and then St Benet's Hall, is now accommodation and teaching space for St Hilda's College.

== History ==
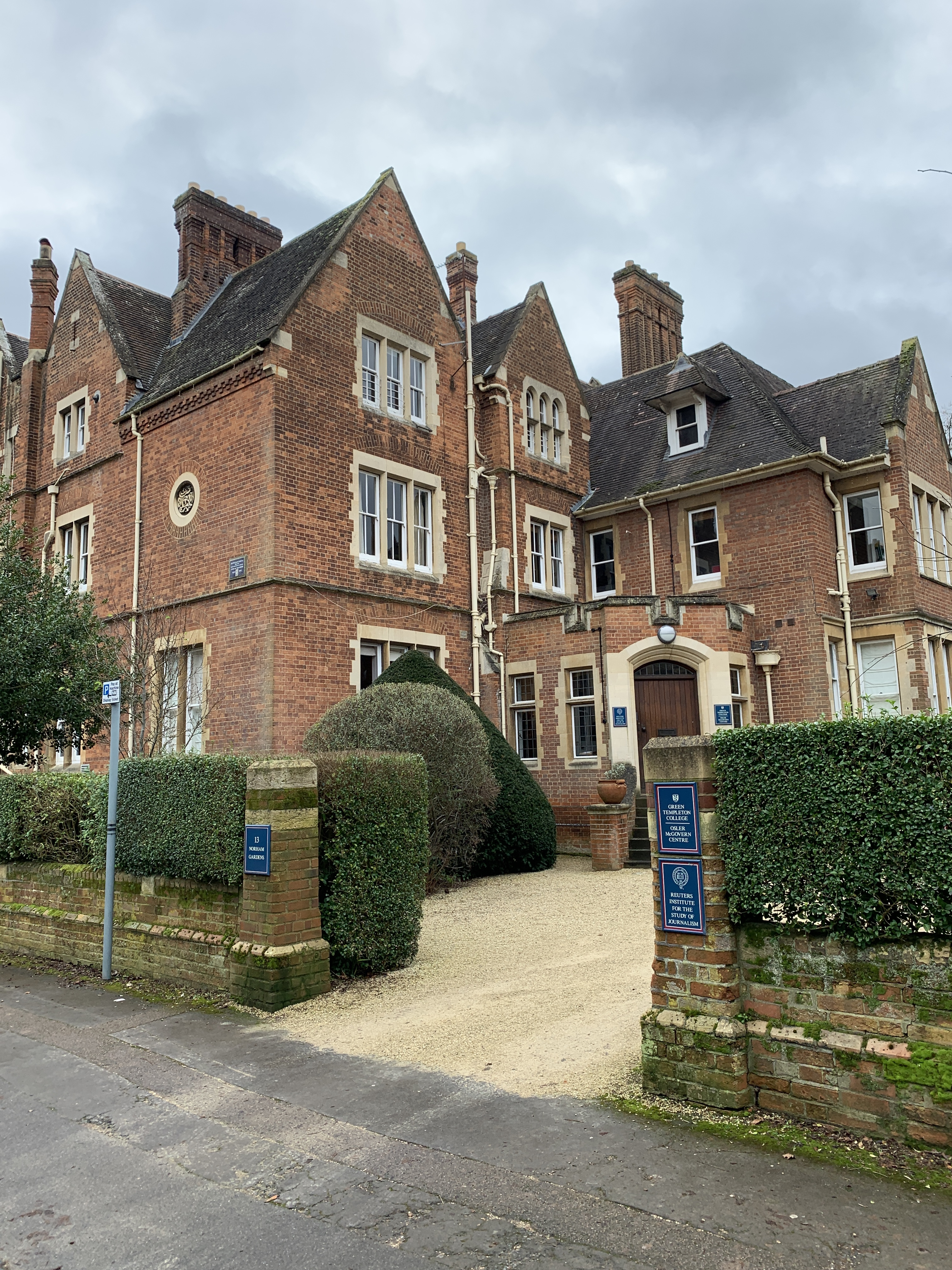
13 Norham Gardens:Sir William Osler's residence in Oxford

Norham Gardens was developed from 1860 onwards as part of the Norham Manor housing estate. Most of its houses are large Victorian Gothic villas. Nos. 1, 5, 7, 11 and 13 were designed by the architect William Wilkinson and nos. 3 and 9 are by Charles Buckeridge. The Sanskrit scholar, Max Müller lived at No. 7 from 1848 until his death in 1900. When he was Regius Professor of Medicine (1905–1919), Sir William Osler lived at No. 13 with his wife, Grace, who remained there until her death in 1928. Osler and his friends nicknamed the house "The Open Arms" as the Oslers were very sociable, particularly to Canadians and Americans visiting Oxford, Osler having been born in Canada and having worked in both Canada and the US before moving to Oxford. The Deneke family, including the sisters Helena Deneke (1878–1973), a bursar and German tutor at Lady Margaret Hall and the pianist Margaret Deneke (1882–1969), lived at No. 19, Gunfield. They held musical soirees at Gunfield, with guests including Albert Einstein and Albert Schweitzer.

== Literature ==
The children's fantasy novel The House in Norham Gardens (set in a fictional No. 40) was written by Penelope Lively and published in 1970.

== See also ==
- Gunfield, 19 Norham Gardens

== Sources ==
- Hinchcliffe, Tanis (1992). North Oxford. New Haven: Yale University Press. ISBN 0-300-05184-0.
- Lively, Penelope (2004). The House in Norham Gardens. Jane Nissen Books. ISBN 1-903252-18-0.
- Sherwood, Jennifer; Pevsner, Nikolaus (1974). The Buildings of England: Oxfordshire. Harmondsworth: Penguin Books. p. 317. ISBN 0-14-071045-0.
- Tyack, Geoffrey (1998). Oxford An Architectural Guide. Oxford & New York: Oxford University Press. pp. 234–235. ISBN 0-19-817423-3.
