= Bradmore Road =

Road in North Oxford, England

Coordinates: 51.764°N 1.259°W

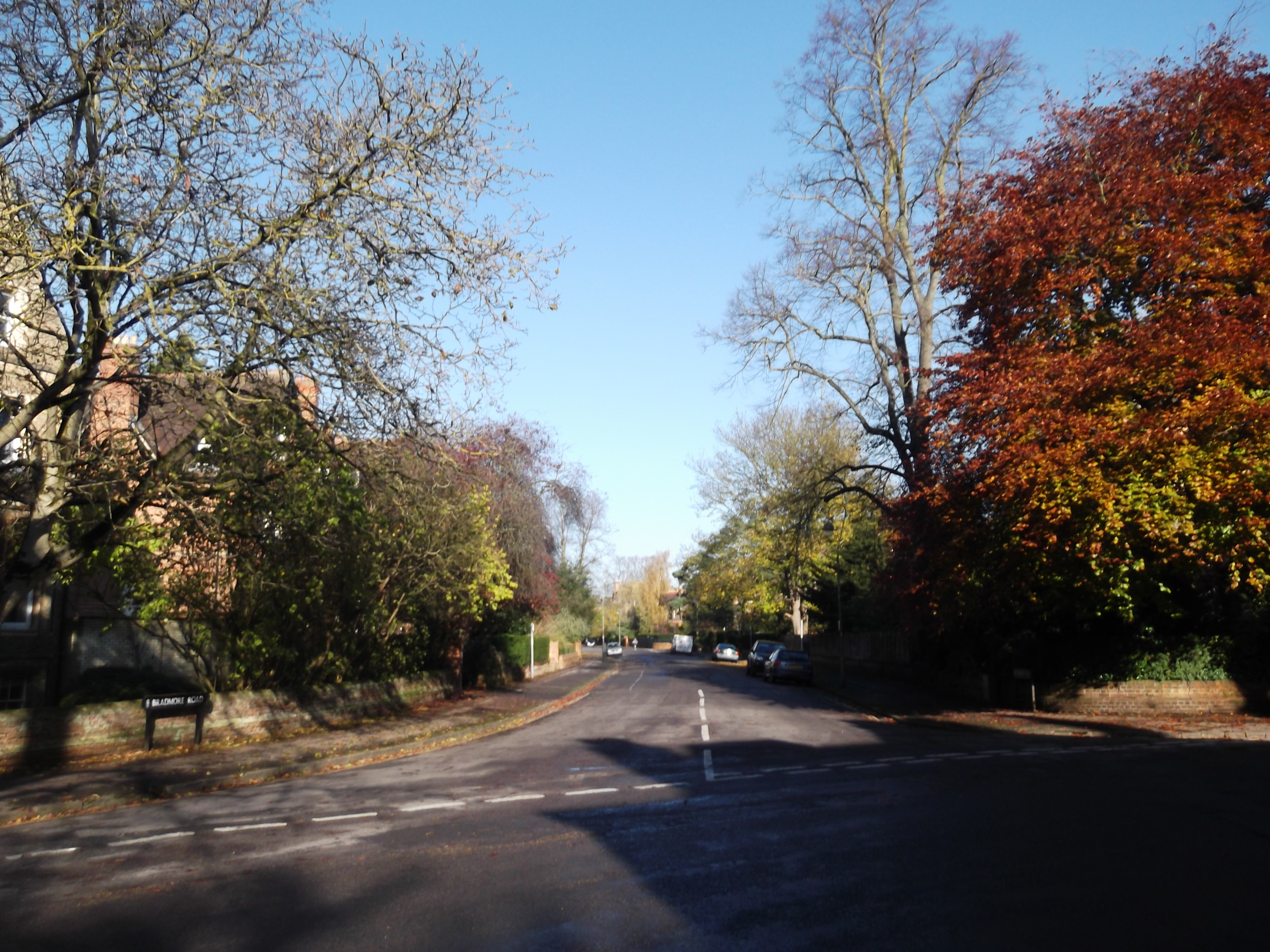
View north along Bradmore Road from the junction with Norham Gardens.

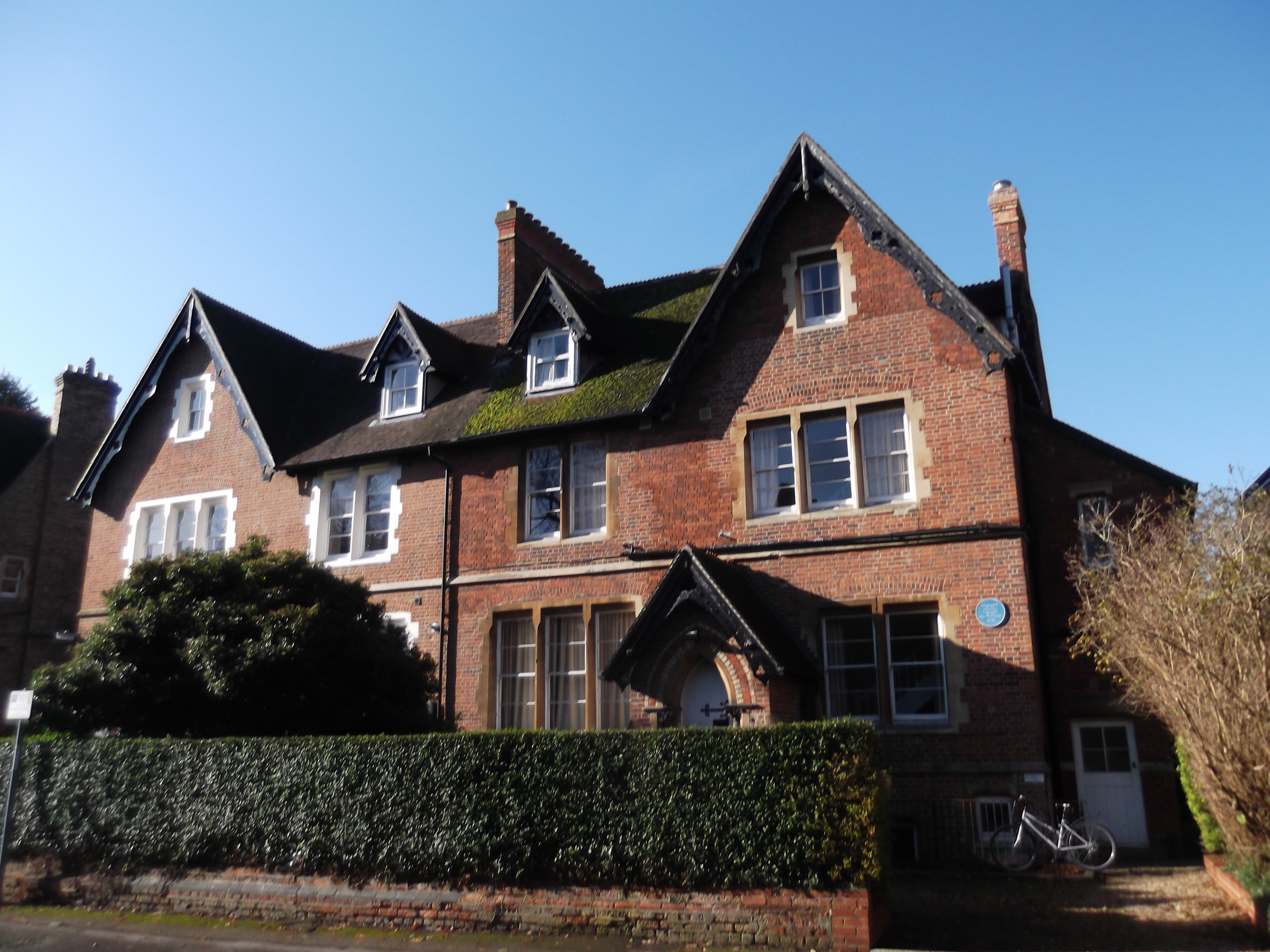
Houses on the west side of Bradmore Road. The right-hand house with a blue plaque is No. 2, home of the author and scholar Walter Pater and his sister Clara Pater, a pioneer of women's education.

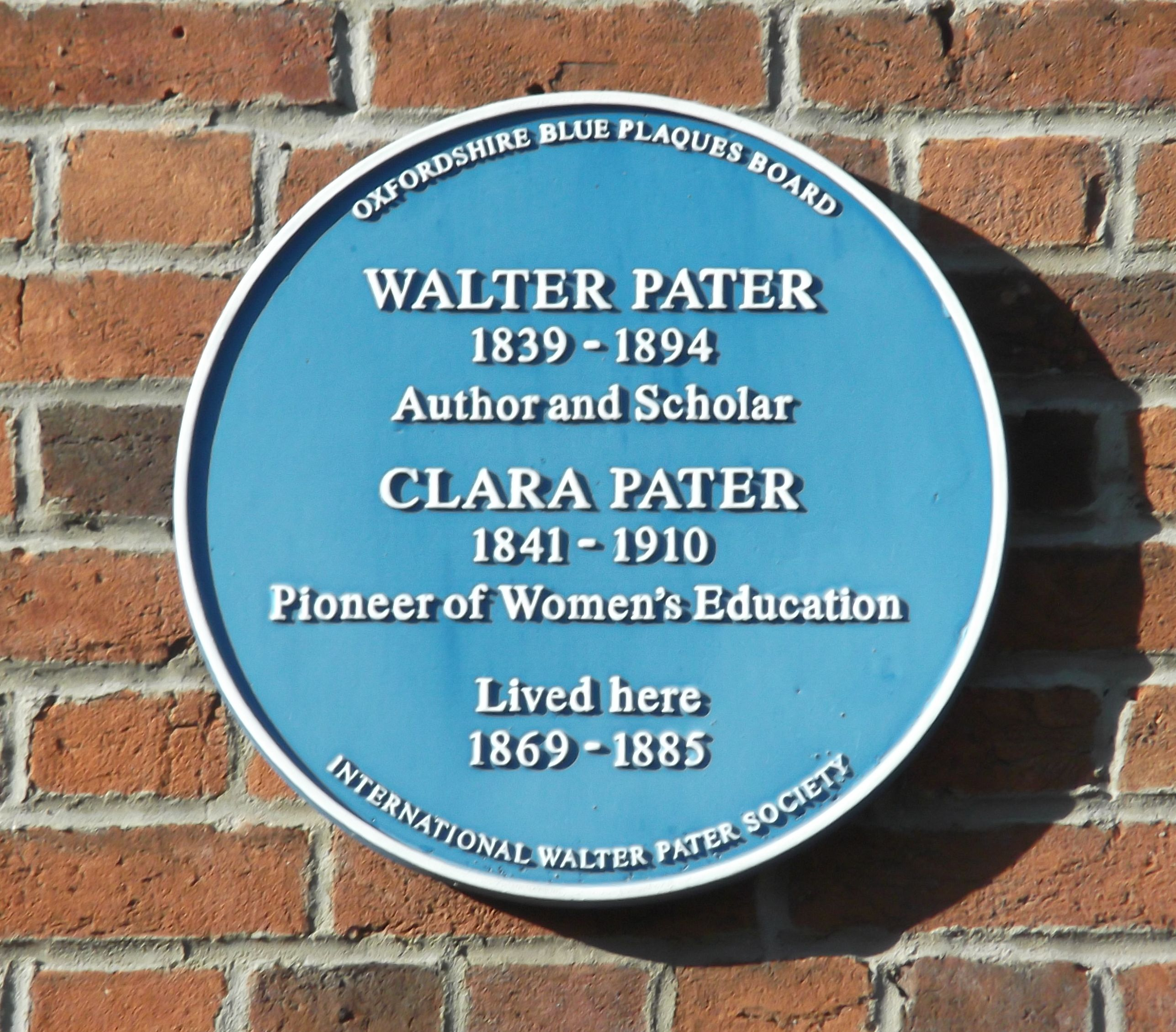
The blue plaque at 2 Bradmore Road.

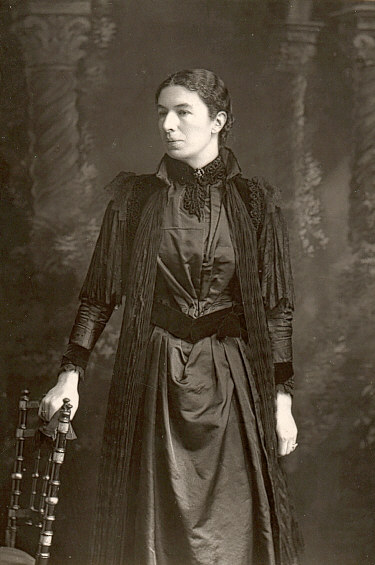
Mary Augusta Ward (1851–1920), the social reformer and novelist, who lived at 17 Bradmore Road.

Bradmore Road is a residential road in North Oxford, England.

At the northern end of the road is a junction with Norham Road and at the southern end is a junction with Norham Gardens, with the University Parks opposite. Halfway along the road, Crick Road leads east to Fyfield Road. To the west is Banbury Road.

== History and residents ==
Houses in the road were first leased between 1870 and 1874 on land owned by St John's College. They were mainly designed by Frederick Codd (Nos 1–2 and 13–17) and Galpin & Shirley (Nos 7–12 and 18–20). The houses by Codd are in the traditional North Oxford Victorian Gothic style. St John's College closely controlled the scale and distribution of the houses on the road, with the subsequent designs ensuring provision of adequate rear gardens and front walls and railings.

John Galpin (1824–1891), an auctioneer and Mayor of Oxford in 1873–74 and 1879–80, leased 12 Bradmore Road in 1873. The Dowager Lady Buxton also leased 20 Bradmore Road in 1873. Sir Edward Henry Pelham (1876–1949), the son of Henry Francis Pelham (President of Trinity College, Oxford) and Laura Priscilla Buxton, later Permanent Secretary of the Board of Education between 1931 and 1937, was born in 20 Bradmore Road on 20 December 1876. In 1874, 13 Bradfield Road was leased to William Esson (1838–1916), a mathematician and Fellow of Merton College, Oxford.

Nos 9 and 10 were for a time a Radcliffe Infirmary nurses' home and later an annexe of Green College.

Walter Pater (1839–1894), author and scholar, and his sister Clara Pater (1841–1910), a pioneer of women's education, lived at 2 Bradmore Road. A blue plaque was installed by the Oxfordshire Blue Plaques Board in 2004. Mary Augusta Ward (known as Mrs Humphry Ward, 1851–1920), the social reformer and novelist, lived at 17 Bradmore Road. A blue plaque was installed in 2012. Her husband Thomas Humphry Ward (1845–1926), author and Fellow of Brasenose College, Oxford, leased the house in 1872. Other former residents included Sir Halford Mackinder (1861–1947), considered a founder of modern geography, and the biologist Professor Sir Ray Lankester (1847–1929).

Evolutionary biologist and author Richard Dawkins was a resident.

13 Bradmore Road has been listed Grade II on the National Heritage List for England since October 2008. The heritage listing describes the house as one of Cobb's "more successful commissions, standing out from other works by virtue of its overall success as a varied composition, the relatively richness of the masonry detailing, and its prominent corner position in the streetscape".

== Today ==
St Cross College has accommodation in 2 Bradmore Road. The University of Oxford runs a day nursery at 4c Bradmore Road. Nos 5–8 are owned by Linacre College. Kellogg College has accommodation at 7, 9/10 and 11 Bradmore Road (11 was formerly a St Anne's College house) with 12 and 13 currently being refurbished.
