= William Wilkinson (architect) =

British architect (1819–1901)

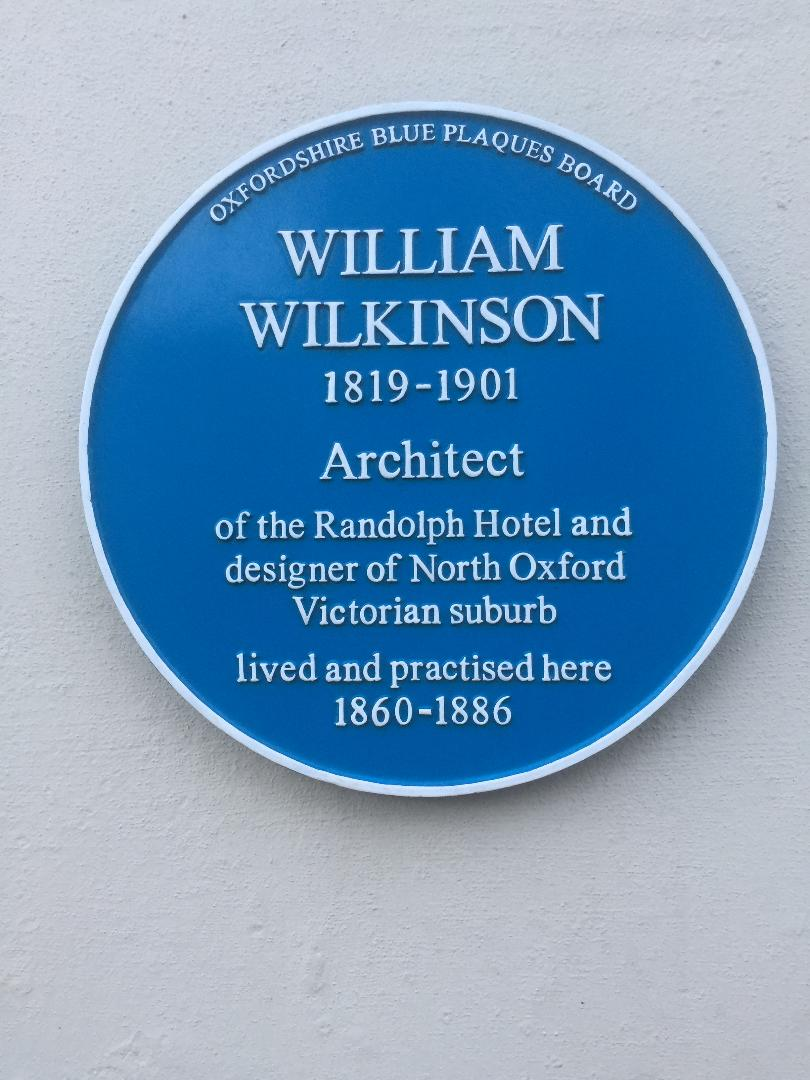
- Born: 1819
- Died: 1901
- Occupation: Architect
- Practice: Wilkinson and Moore (from 1881)
- Buildings: Randolph Hotel, Oxford; Shelswell Park, Shelswell, Oxfordshire
- Projects: St Edward's School, Oxford; Norham Manor Estate, Oxford

William Wilkinson (1819–1901) was a British Gothic Revival architect who practised in Oxford, England.

== Family ==
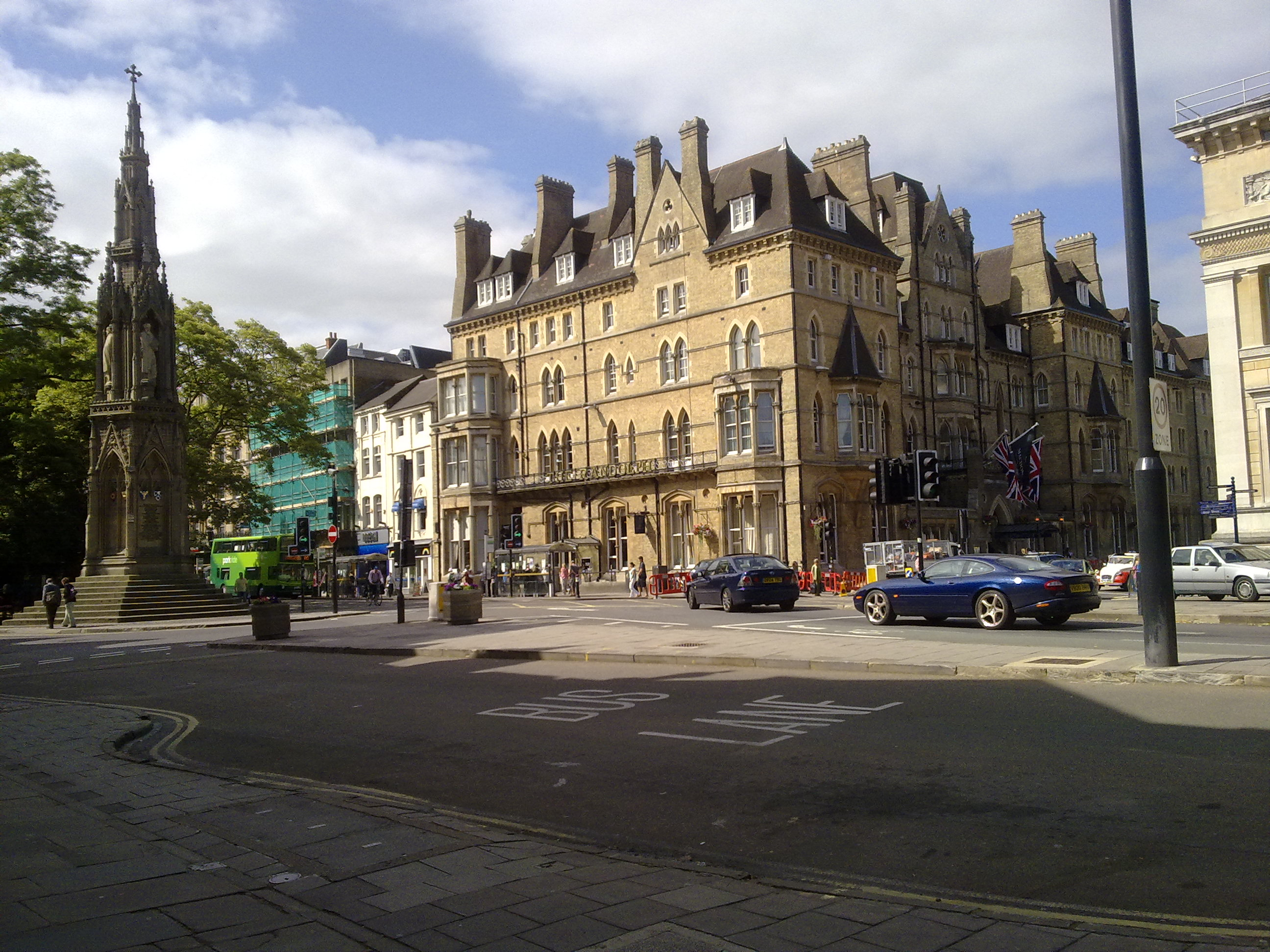
The Randolph Hotel, Oxford, situated between the Martyrs' Memorial (left) and the Taylor Institution (partially visible, right)

Wilkinson was born into a family connected with the building trades. His father worked as a builder in Witney, in Oxfordshire.

Architecture featured prominently among his close relatives. His elder brother, George Wilkinson (1814–1890), practised as an architect. Two of his nephews also entered the profession: C.C. Rolfe (died 1907) and H.W. Moore (1850–1915).

== Career ==
Most of Wilkinson's buildings are in Oxfordshire. His major works include the Randolph Hotel in Oxford, completed in 1864. He was in partnership with his nephew H.W. Moore from 1881. In his long career Wilkinson had a number of pupils, including H.J. Tollit (1835–1904).

== Works ==
=== Churches ===
In 1841, at the age of only 22, Wilkinson designed a new Church of England parish church, Holy Trinity at Lew, Oxfordshire. His other work on churches included:

- St Leonard's parish church, Eynsham: restoration, 1856
- Witney Cemetery: lodge and two chapels, 1857
- Witney Workhouse: chapel, 1860
- All Saints' parish church, Middleton Cheney, Northamptonshire: Horton family mausoleum, 1866–67
- St Andrew's parish church, Headington, Oxford: added north aisle, 1880

=== Police buildings ===
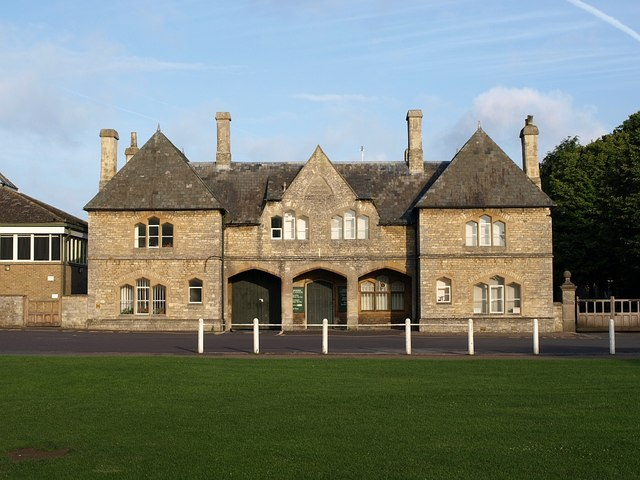
Former police station in Witney

Wilkinson moved to Oxford in 1856 and succeeded J.C. Buckler as architect to the local police committee. Oxfordshire County Constabulary was formed in 1857, and Wilkinson designed several buildings for the new force.

- Watlington police station, 1858–59
- Witney police station, 1860
- Woodstock police station, 1863
- Chipping Norton police station, 1864–65
- Burford police station, 1869
- Magistrates' room at Deddington Court House, 1874

=== Houses ===
Wilkinson designed Home Farm on the Shirburn Castle estate, built in 1856–57. From 1860 he laid out the Norham Manor estate in north Oxford. The estate was slowly developed with large villas, a number of which Wilkinson designed himself. Wilkinson also designed town houses and small country houses elsewhere in Oxfordshire:

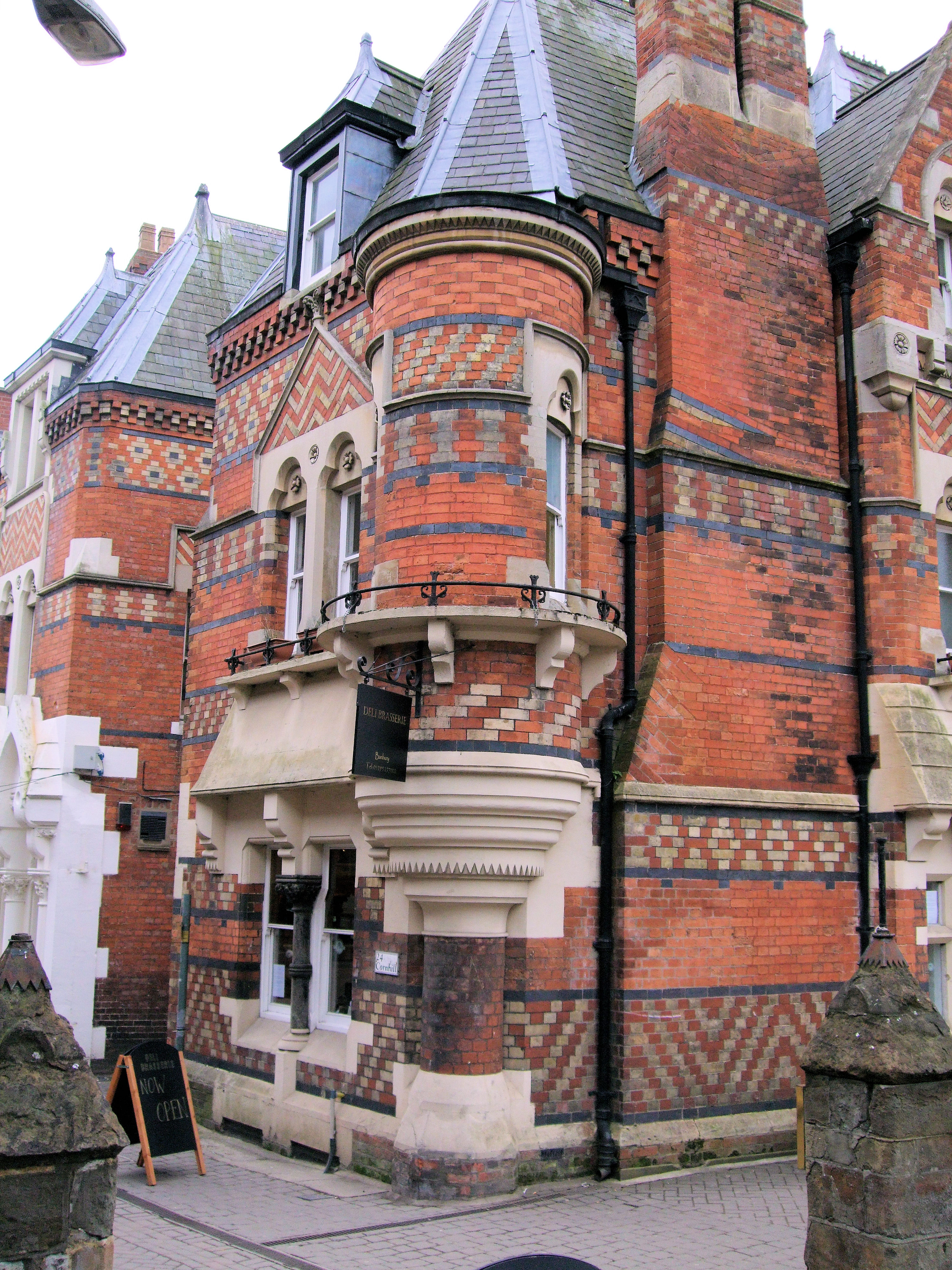
23 Cornhill, Banbury

- Hollybank, Wootton, 1862–63
- 10, Broad Street, Oxford, 1863
- Whittlebury, Northamptonshire: farmhouse, 1864
- The Holt, Middleton Cheney, Northamptonshire, 1864
- 60 Banbury Road, Oxford, 1865–66
- Bignell House, Chesterton, 1866 (partly demolished)
- 23 and 24 Cornhill, Banbury, 1866
- Astrop Park, Northamptonshire: lodge, pheasantry and cottage, 1868
- Witney Almshouses: restoration, 1868.
- Brashfield House, Caversfield, 1871–73
- Shelswell Park, Shelswell, 1875
- Cowley Place (now St Hilda's College, Oxford): extension, 1877–78

=== Clergy houses ===
A number of the houses that Wilkinson designed were for clergy. Most were for the Church of England, but he also designed a presbytery that was built for the Roman Catholic Church.

- Ramsden parsonage, 1862
- Chadlington parsonage, 1863 (now Chadlington House)
- Duns Tew rectory, 1864 (now Priory Court)
- Godington parsonage, 1867 (now the Old Vicarage)
- Upper Heyford parsonage, 1869
- Rousham rectory: enlargement and remodelling, 1873.
- St Aloysius' presbytery, Woodstock Road, Oxford, 1877–78
- Combe vicarage and Institute (with H.W. Moore), 1892–93

=== Educational establishments ===
Wilkinson designed the library for the Oxford Union, built in 1863. He designed a number of schools, of which the largest was St Edward's School, Oxford, whose buildings he completed in phases from 1873 until 1886. His other schools include:

- Hailey School, 1848
- Minster Lovell School, 1870–72
- Burford Elementary School, 1875–77
- Thame Grammar School, 1877–79
- Salesian College, Crescent Road, Cowley, 1880

=== Industrial buildings ===
Late in his career Wilkinson undertook one industrial commission: a new smith shop and foundry for William Lucy's Eagle Ironworks in Jericho, Oxford. This single-storey building was completed in 1879. It was demolished after Lucy ceased production in England in 2005.

=== Publications ===
- Wilkinson, William (1875) [1870]. English Country Houses: Sixty-one Views and Plans of Recently Erected Mansions, Private Residences, Parsonage-Houses, Farm-Houses, Lodges, and Cottages; with Sketches of Furniture and Fittings; and a Practical Treatise on House-Building (second ed.). London: James Parker and Co.

== See also ==
- List of Oxford architects

== Sources ==
- Brodie, Antonia; Felstead, Alison; Franklin, Jonathan; Pinfield, Leslie; Oldfield, Jane, eds. (2001). Directory of British Architects 1834–1914, L–Z. London & New York: Continuum. p. 994. ISBN 0-8264-5514-X.
- Crossley, Alan (ed.); Baggs, A.P.; Colvin, Christina; Colvin, H.M.; Cooper, Janet; Day, C.J.; Selwyn, Nesta; Tomkinson, A. (1983). A History of the County of Oxford. Victoria County History. Vol. 11: Wootton Hundred (northern part). London: Oxford University Press for the Institute of Historical Research. pp. 159–168. ISBN 978-0-19722-758-9.
- Pevsner, Nikolaus; Cherry, Bridget (revision) (1973) [1961]. Northamptonshire. The Buildings of England (2nd ed.). Harmondsworth: Penguin Books. ISBN 0-14-071022-1.
- Saint, Andrew (1970). "Three Oxford Architects". Oxoniensia. XXXV. Oxfordshire Architectural and Historical Society: 53 ff. Archived from the original on 28 September 2007.
- Sherwood, Jennifer; Pevsner, Nikolaus (1974). Oxfordshire. The Buildings of England. Harmondsworth: Penguin Books. ISBN 0-14-071045-0.
- Townley, Simon C. (ed.); Baggs, A.P.; Chance, Eleanor; Colvin, Christina; Cooper, Janet; Day, C.J.; Selwyn, Nesta; Williamson, Elizabeth; Yates, Margaret (2004). A History of the County of Oxford. Victoria County History. Vol. 14: Witney and its Townships: Bampton Hundred (Part Two). Woodbridge: Boydell & Brewer for the Institute of Historical Research. pp. 254–255. ISBN 978-1-90435-625-7.
- Tyack, Geoffrey (1998). Oxford An Architectural Guide. Oxford & New York: Oxford University Press. ISBN 0-19-817423-3.
- Woolley, Liz (2010). "Industrial Architecture in Oxford, 1870 to 1914". Oxoniensia. LXXV. Oxfordshire Architectural and Historical Society: 67–96. ISSN 0308-5562.
