= The Adventures of Mao on the Long March =

- First edition
- Author: Frederic Tuten
- Cover artist: Roy Lichtenstein
- Language: English
- Genre: Postmodern, Collage, Parody novel
- Publisher: Citadel Press
- Publication date: 1971
- Publication place: United States
- Media type: Print (Hardcover and Paperback)
- Pages: 121 pp
- ISBN: 0-8065-0248-7
- OCLC: 257332
- Dewey Decimal: 951.04/2/0924 B
- LC Class: PZ4.T9663 Ad PS3570.U78

The Adventures of Mao on the Long March is Frederic Tuten's first published novel. The novel is a fictionalized account of Chairman Mao's rise to power, and is highly experimental in nature, including extensive use of parody and collage.

== Plot summary ==
The novel has no linear plot, and is mostly composed of an elaborate arrangement of disparate elements. The novel presents a seemingly straightforward history of the Long March, as well as a fictionalized interview with Mao and several more conventional "novelistic" scenes with Mao as the main character. The novel also includes a large selection of unattributed quotes from various sources and parodies of certain writers, including Faulkner, Hemingway, and Kerouac.

== Publication history ==
The story first appeared in 1969 in a 39-page condensed form in the magazine Artist Slain. In 1970 the completed book was sent to various publishers and rejected as it was not considered a novel. Tuten considered self-publication and asked his friend Roy Lichtenstein to do the cover. Eventually, he was offered a publication deal by Citadel Press, on the condition that Lichtenstein make a lithograph of Mao for a deluxe edition (Lichtenstein's "Head of Mao" precedes Andy Warhol's Mao series by two years). The lithograph and book were published in an edition of 150 signed copies. However, the special edition was then disassembled by the publisher and very few of the original box editions remain intact. The novel was finally printed in 1971 and received a favorable review in The New York Times by Thomas Lask; this was followed by several other positive reviews and comments by writers, including Susan Sontag, Iris Murdoch and John Updike. In 1977 Marion Boyers reprinted the novel in England and the U.S., making sure to keep it in print as long as she was alive. The novel was re-released in 2005 by New Directions and is currently still in print.

== Cover and layout ==
The cover of Mao features original artwork by painter Roy Lichtenstein, Tuten's close friend. It is a bold, smiling depiction of Mao, rendered in Lichtenstein's trademark benday dot style. Tuten himself was actually used as a model for the drawing, which Lichtenstein altered accordingly to resemble Mao.

The font used in the book intentionally resembles that of an informational pamphlet.

== Quotations ==
I'm an old man who wants to dream the remaining days away. Yet I can't take a nice healthy crap without some fanatic bowing to the stool and singing: "Oh, our great Chairman Mao has again fertilized the world." What was all my hard work for, if I can't fill my last hours with serenity and nonproductive contemplation?

- Chairman Mao

Mao's wife sighs. "Come to bed, my sweet man; you need to dream."
"Not tonight. Tonight I would like to love you alone."
"Oh! Mao, the world is too tired for that."
"We must stir it to life then. The sexual act is a revolutionary act."

- A conversation between Mao and his wife on the Long March.

Satire must never be directed against the class whose aspirations you share - only against the enemy.

Chairman Mao criticizing La Chinoise, a film by Jean-Luc Godard

== Allusions/references to other works ==
The book is loaded with references to writers and literary texts, in the form of direct quotes, parodies, and allusions:

=== Quoted texts ===
- William Shakespeare – Anthony and Cleopatra
- Jack London – The Iron Heel, Martin Eden
- Nathaniel Hawthorne – The Marble Faun, The Blithedale Romance, Twice-Told Tales, Septimus Felton
- John William De Forest – Miss Ravenel's Conversion from Secession to Loyalty
- Herman Melville – "Roman Statuary"
- James Fenimore Cooper – The Bravo, The Pioneers
- Ralph Waldo Emerson – "The Transcendentalists"
- Washington Irving – The Adventures of Captain Bonneville
- Walter Pater – The Renaissance, Marius the Epicurean
- Oscar Wilde – De Profundis

=== Parodied authors ===
- John Dos Passos
- William Faulkner
- Ernest Hemingway
- Jack Kerouac
- Bernard Malamud
- John Steinbeck

=== References to writers, artists, and filmmakers ===
In the fictional interview with Mao, over fifty books and publications, as well as several artists and filmmakers, are mentioned in passing. The following list includes only those who were discussed at length by Mao:

- Jean-Luc Godard - Made in U.S.A., La Chinoise, Vivre sa vie, Breathless
- Leon Trotsky - Literature and Revolution
- Kenneth Burke - Counter-Statement, Philosophy of Literary Form
- John Keats - "Ode on a Grecian Urn"
- Wallace Stevens
- Salvador Dalí

== Literary significance & criticism ==
Earl Rovit describes the novel as:

an artful pastiche of parody, surprising quotations, startling juxtaposition, teasing incongruity, and shrewd illumination of the knotted contradictoriness of the Western aesthetic tradition. Tuten makes subtle and productive use of the strategies of focus and composition which are traditionally the property of the visual arts.

According to Robert Detweiler, Tuten's handling of history as fantasy "enables the reader to grasp immediately the distortion of history and contrast it to the actual structure of past events." By transforming Mao into an insecure buffoon and the march into a mad and chaotic journey, the novel comically deflates the mythical status Mao had at the time.

== Editions ==
- Tuten, Frederic (1971). The Adventures of Mao on the Long March. New York, N.Y.: Citadel Press. ISBN 0-8065-0248-7.
- Tuten, Frederic (1977). The Adventures of Mao on the Long March. New York, N.Y.; London, England: Marion Boyars. ISBN 0-7145-3021-2.
- Tuten, Frederic (2005). The Adventures of Mao on the Long March. New York, N.Y.: New Directions Classic. ISBN 0-8112-1632-2.
- The novel has also been translated into French and Spanish.

== Sources ==
John Updike's essay on the novel, "Satire without Serifs," originally appeared in the New Yorker. It was reprinted as an introduction in the 2005 New Direction edition, along with an introductory essay and postscript by Tuten himself.
