= Iris Smyles =

American writer

Iris Smyles is an American writer. Her debut novel Iris Has Free Time (2013) was published by Soft Skull Press and Dating Tips for the Unemployed (2016), an informal companion novel, was published by Houghton Mifflin Harcourt and was a semi-finalist for the 2017 Thurber Prize for American Humor. Her third book, Droll Tales, a collection of loosely inter-connected stories was published by Turtle Point Press in 2022. Smyles has also contributed stories, essays, and poems to The New York Times, The Atlantic, The New Yorker, Vogue, Paris Review Daily, Bomb, Guernica Magazine, New York Press, McSweeney's Internet Tendecy and Best American Travel Writing 2015. She also wrote columns for Splice Today and The East Hampton Star.

Smyles was co-founder of the online and print magazine Smyles & Fish, later turned into a "web museum", featuring works by Frederic Tuten, Jerome Charyn, Aurelie Sheehan, Shay K. Azoulay and others. The Capricious Critic by Ari Martin Samsky, a column commissioned for the site, was later published as a book edited and with an afterword by Smyles.
