= Phil Graham (disambiguation) =

Phil Graham (1915–1963) was an American publisher and businessman.

Phil, Philip, or Phillip Graham or may also refer to:

== Sport ==
- Phil Graham (Australian rules) (born 1961), Australian rules footballer
- Phil Graham (rower) (born 1970), Canadian Olympic rower
- Phil Graham (rugby league) (born 1981), Australian rugby league footballer
- Philip Graham (rugby league) (born 1960), Australian rugby league player

== Others ==
- Phil Graham (1915-1963), American newspaperman, publisher of the Washington Post
- Philip Graham, California State Assembly candidate and stepson of former California governor Pete Wilson
- Philip Graham (writer) (born 1951), American author, professor and editor
- Philip A. Graham (1910–1993), American politician in the Massachusetts Senate

== See also ==
- Phil Gramm (born 1942), US politician
