= Walter Pater =

English writer, critic and essayist (1839–1894)

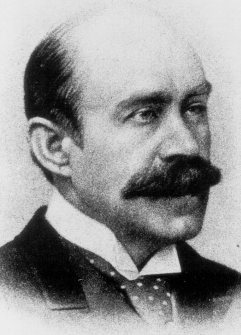
- Pater in the 1890s (photograph by Elliott & Fry)
- Born: Walter Horatio Pater; 4 August 1839; Stepney, London, Middlesex, England
- Died: 30 July 1894 (aged 54); Oxford, England
- Resting place: Holywell Cemetery
- Education: The Queen's College, Oxford
- Occupations: Academic, essayist, writer
- Writing career
- Language: English
- Genres: Art criticism, literary criticism, literary fiction
- Notable works: The Renaissance (1873), Marius the Epicurean (1885)
- Notable awards: Honorary LL.D (University of Glasgow, 1894)
- Movement: Aestheticism

Walter Horatio Pater (4 August 1839 – 30 July 1894) was an English essayist, art and literary critic, and fiction writer, regarded as one of the great stylists. His first and most often reprinted book, Studies in the History of the Renaissance (1873), revised as The Renaissance: Studies in Art and Poetry (1877), in which he outlined his approach to art and advocated an ideal of the intense inner life, was taken by many as a manifesto (whether stimulating or subversive) of Aestheticism.

== Early life ==
Born in Stepney in London's East End, Walter Pater was the second son of Richard Glode Pater, a physician who had moved to London in the early 19th century to practise medicine among the poor. Dr Pater died while Walter was an infant and the family moved to Enfield. Walter attended Enfield Grammar School and was individually tutored by the headmaster.

In 1853 he was sent to The King's School, Canterbury, where the beauty of the cathedral made an impression that would remain with him all his life. He was fourteen when his mother, Maria Pater, died in 1854. As a schoolboy Pater read John Ruskin's Modern Painters, which helped inspire his lifelong attraction to the study of art and gave him a taste for well-crafted prose. He gained a school exhibition, with which he proceeded in 1858 to Queen's College, Oxford.

As an undergraduate, Pater was a "reading man", with literary and philosophical interests beyond the prescribed texts. Flaubert, Gautier, Baudelaire and Swinburne were among his early favourites. Visiting his aunt and sisters in Heidelberg, Germany, during the vacations, he learned German and began to read Hegel and the German philosophers. The scholar Benjamin Jowett was struck by his potential and offered to give him private lessons. In Jowett's classes, however, Pater was a disappointment; he took a Second in Literae Humaniores in 1862. As a boy Pater had cherished the idea of entering the Anglican clergy, but at Oxford his faith in Christianity had been shaken. In spite of his inclination towards the ritual and aesthetic elements of the church, he had little interest in Christian doctrine and did not pursue ordination. After graduating, Pater remained in Oxford and taught Classics and Philosophy to private students. (His sister Clara Pater, a pioneer of women's education, later taught ancient Greek and Latin at Somerville College, of which she was one of the co-founders.) Pater's years of study and reading now paid dividends: he was offered a classical fellowship in 1864 at Brasenose on the strength of his ability to teach modern German philosophy, and he settled down to a university career.

== Career and writings ==
=== The Renaissance ===
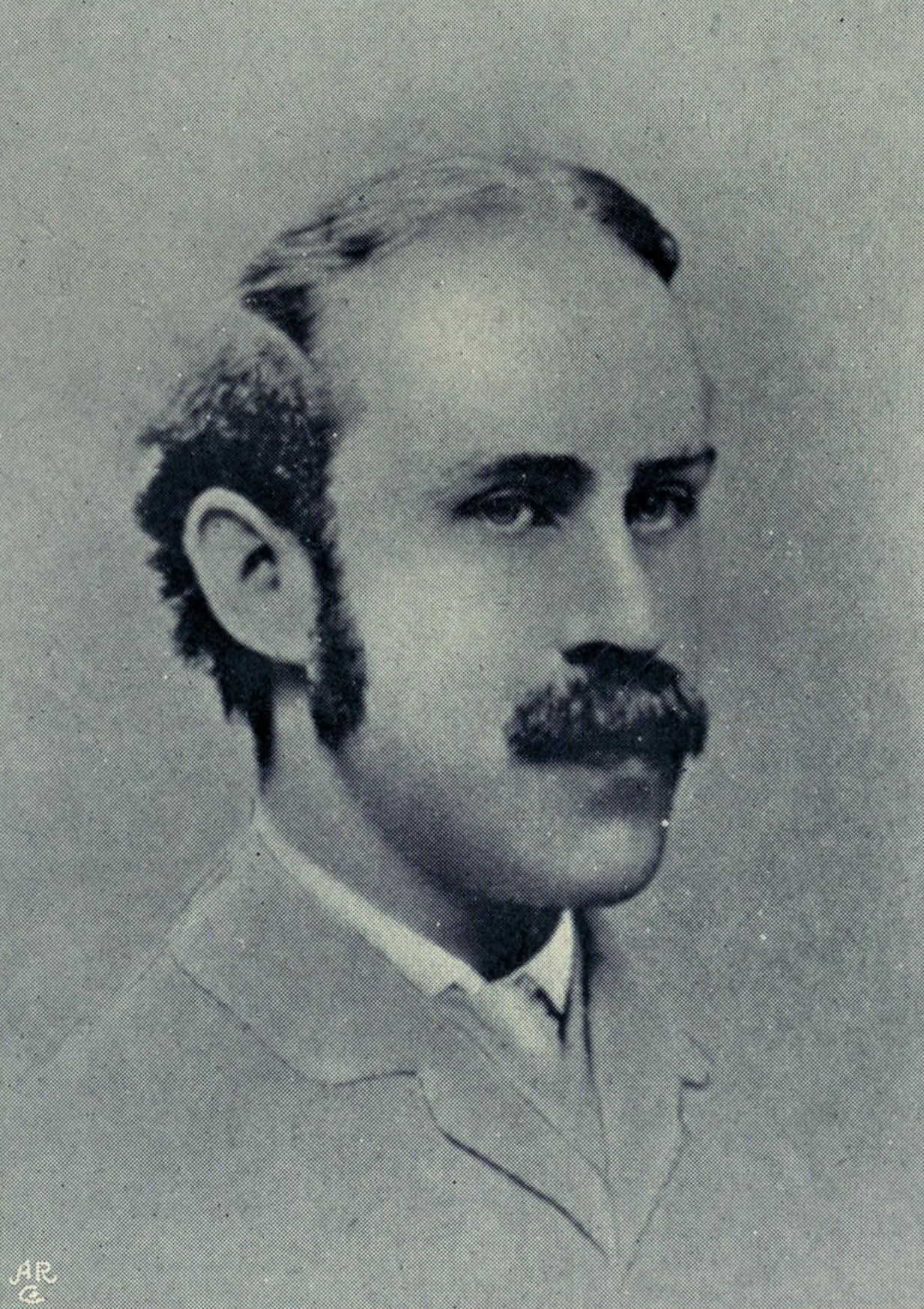
Pater as a young don at Brasenose

The opportunities for wider study and teaching at Oxford, combined with formative visits to the Continent – in 1865 he visited Florence, Pisa and Ravenna – meant that Pater's preoccupations now multiplied. He became acutely interested in art and literature, and started to write articles and criticism. First to be printed was an essay on the metaphysics of Coleridge, 'Coleridge's Writings', contributed anonymously in 1866 to the Westminster Review. A few months later his essay on Winckelmann (1867), an early expression of his intellectual and artistic idealism, appeared in the same review, followed by 'The Poems of William Morris' (1868), expressing his admiration for romanticism. In the following years the Fortnightly Review printed his essays on Leonardo da Vinci (1869), Sandro Botticelli (1870), and Michelangelo (1871). The last three, with other similar pieces, were collected in his Studies in the History of the Renaissance (1873), renamed in the second and later editions The Renaissance: Studies in Art and Poetry. The Leonardo essay contains Pater's celebrated reverie on the Mona Lisa ("probably still the most famous piece of writing about any picture in the world"); the Botticelli essay was the first in English on this painter, contributing to the revival of interest in him; while the Winckelmann essay explored a temperament with whom Pater felt a strong affinity. An essay on 'The School of Giorgione' (Fortnightly Review, 1877), added to the third edition (1888), contains Pater's much-quoted maxim "All art constantly aspires towards the condition of music" (i.e. the arts seek to unify subject-matter and form, and music is the only art in which subject and form are seemingly one). The final paragraphs of the 1868 William Morris essay were reworked as the book's 'Conclusion'.

This brief 'Conclusion' was to be Pater's most influential – and controversial – publication. It asserts that our physical lives are made up of scientific processes and elemental forces in perpetual motion, "renewed from moment to moment but parting sooner or later on their ways". In the mind "the whirlpool is still more rapid": a drift of perceptions, feelings, thoughts and memories, reduced to impressions "unstable, flickering, inconstant", "ringed round for each one of us by that thick wall of personality"; and "with the passage and dissolution of impressions... [there is a] continual vanishing away, that strange, perpetual weaving and unweaving of ourselves". Because all is in flux, to get the most from life, we must learn to discriminate through "sharp and eager observation": for

every moment some form grows perfect in hand or face; some tone on the hills or the sea is choicer than the rest; some mood of passion or insight or intellectual excitement is irresistibly real and attractive for us, – for that moment only.

Through such discrimination we may "get as many pulsations as possible into the given time": "To burn always with this hard, gem-like flame, to maintain this ecstasy, is success in life." Forming habits means failure on our part, for habit connotes the stereotypical. "While all melts under our feet," Pater wrote, "we may well catch at any exquisite passion, or any contribution to knowledge that seems by a lifted horizon to set the spirit free for a moment, or any stirring of the senses, or work of the artist's hands. Not to discriminate every moment some passionate attitude in those about us in the brilliancy of their gifts is, on this short day of frost and sun, to sleep before evening." The resulting "quickened, multiplied consciousness" counters our insecurity in the face of the flux. Moments of vision may come from simple natural effects, as Pater notes elsewhere in the book: "A sudden light transfigures a trivial thing, a weathervane, a windmill, a winnowing flail, the dust in the barn door; a moment – and the thing has vanished, because it was pure effect; but it leaves a relish behind it, a longing that the accident may happen again." Or they may come from "intellectual excitement", from philosophy, science and the arts. Here we should "be for ever testing new opinions, never acquiescing in a facile orthodoxy"; and of these, a passion for the arts, "a desire of beauty", has (in the summary of one of Pater's editors) "the greatest potential for staving off the sense of transience, because in the arts the perceptions of highly sensitive minds are already ordered; we are confronted with a reality already refined and we are able to reach the personality behind the work".

==== Reception and aftermath ====
The Renaissance, which appeared to some to endorse amorality and "hedonism", provoked criticism from conservative quarters, including disapproval from Pater's former tutor at Queen's College, from the chaplain at Brasenose College and from the Bishop of Oxford. Margaret Oliphant, reviewing the book in Blackwood's Magazine, dismissed it as "the very madness of fantastic modernism trying to foist its own refinements into the primitive mind and age" and "rococo from beginning to end,—in its new version of [...] the Epicureans’ gay despair". George Eliot condemned it as "quite poisonous in its false principles of criticism and false conceptions of life".

In 1874 Pater was turned down at the last moment by his erstwhile mentor Benjamin Jowett, Master of Balliol, for a previously-promised proctorship. In the 1980s, letters emerged documenting a "romance" with a nineteen-year-old Balliol undergraduate, William Money Hardinge, who had attracted unfavorable attention as a result of his outspoken homosexuality and blasphemous verse, and who later became a novelist. Many of Pater's works focus on male beauty, friendship and love, either in a Platonic way or, obliquely, in a more physical way. Another undergraduate, W. H. Mallock, had passed the Pater-Hardinge letters to Jowett, who summoned Pater:

"Pater's whole nature changed under the strain" (wrote A. C. Benson in his diary) "after the dreadful interview with Jowett. He became old, crushed, despairing – and this dreadful weight lasted for years; it was years before he realised that Jowett would not use them."

In 1876 Mallock parodied Pater's message in a satirical novel The New Republic, depicting Pater as 'Mr Rose', a typically effete English aesthete. (Note: The New Republic was first published in Belgravia magazine, June to December 1876, with book publication in March 1877. The parody contributed to Pater's decision to drop the 'Conclusion' (Mallock's main source for Mr Rose) in the second edition of The Renaissance, published in June 1877. (Tillotson, G., 'Pater, Mr Rose, and the Conclusion to The Renaissance ', Essays and Studies by Members of the English Association, Vol.32, 1946, pp.44-60)) The satire appeared during the competition for the Oxford Professorship of Poetry and played a role in convincing Pater to remove himself from consideration. A few months later Pater published what may have been a subtle riposte: 'A Study of Dionysus' the outsider-god, persecuted for his new religion of ecstasy, who vanquishes the forces of reaction (The Fortnightly Review, Dec. 1876).

=== Marius the Epicurean and Imaginary Portraits ===
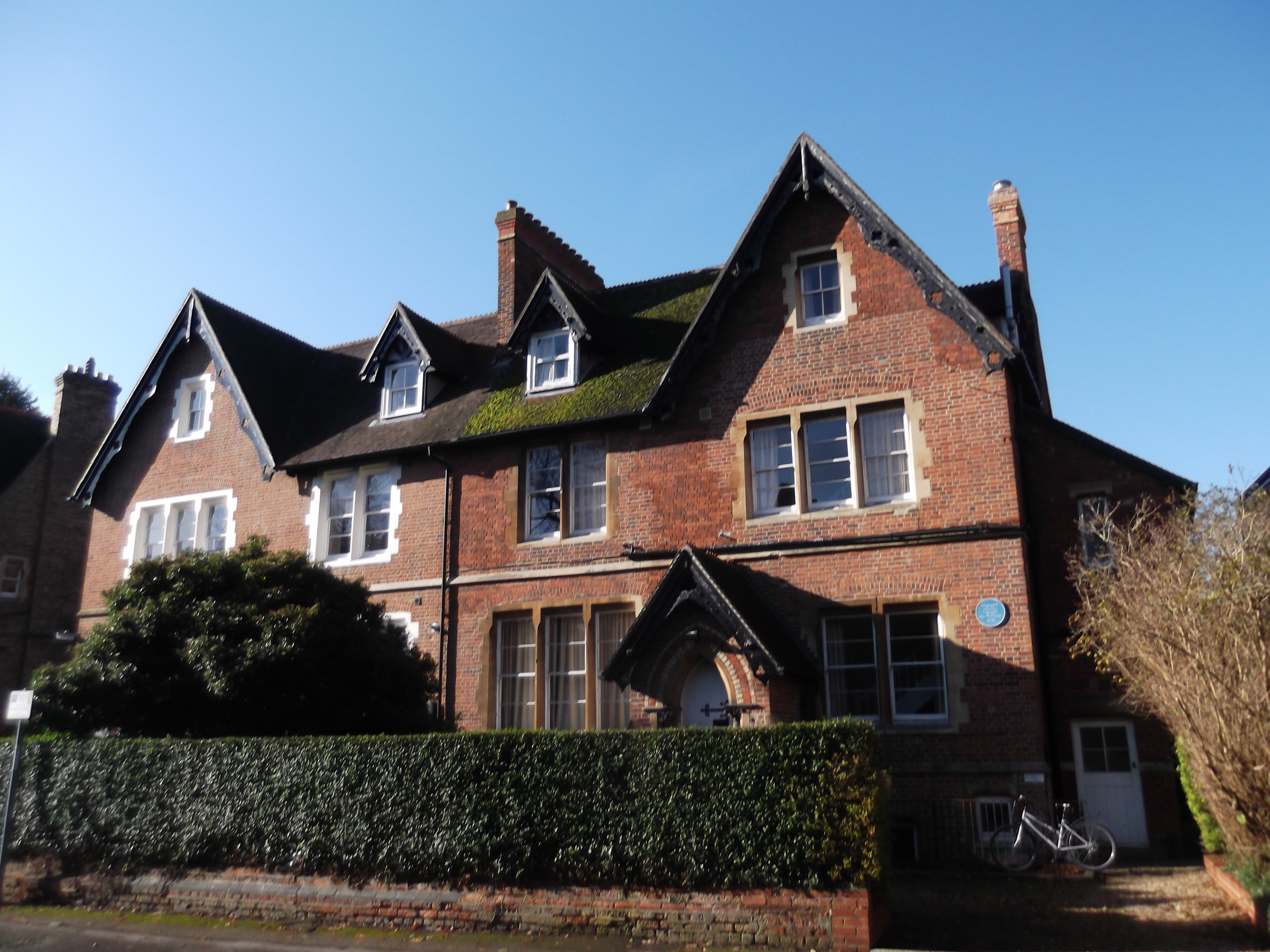
Walter Pater lived at 2 Bradmore Road in North Oxford (the right-hand house with a blue plaque) between 1869 and 1885 with his sisters, including Clara Pater, a pioneer of women's education.

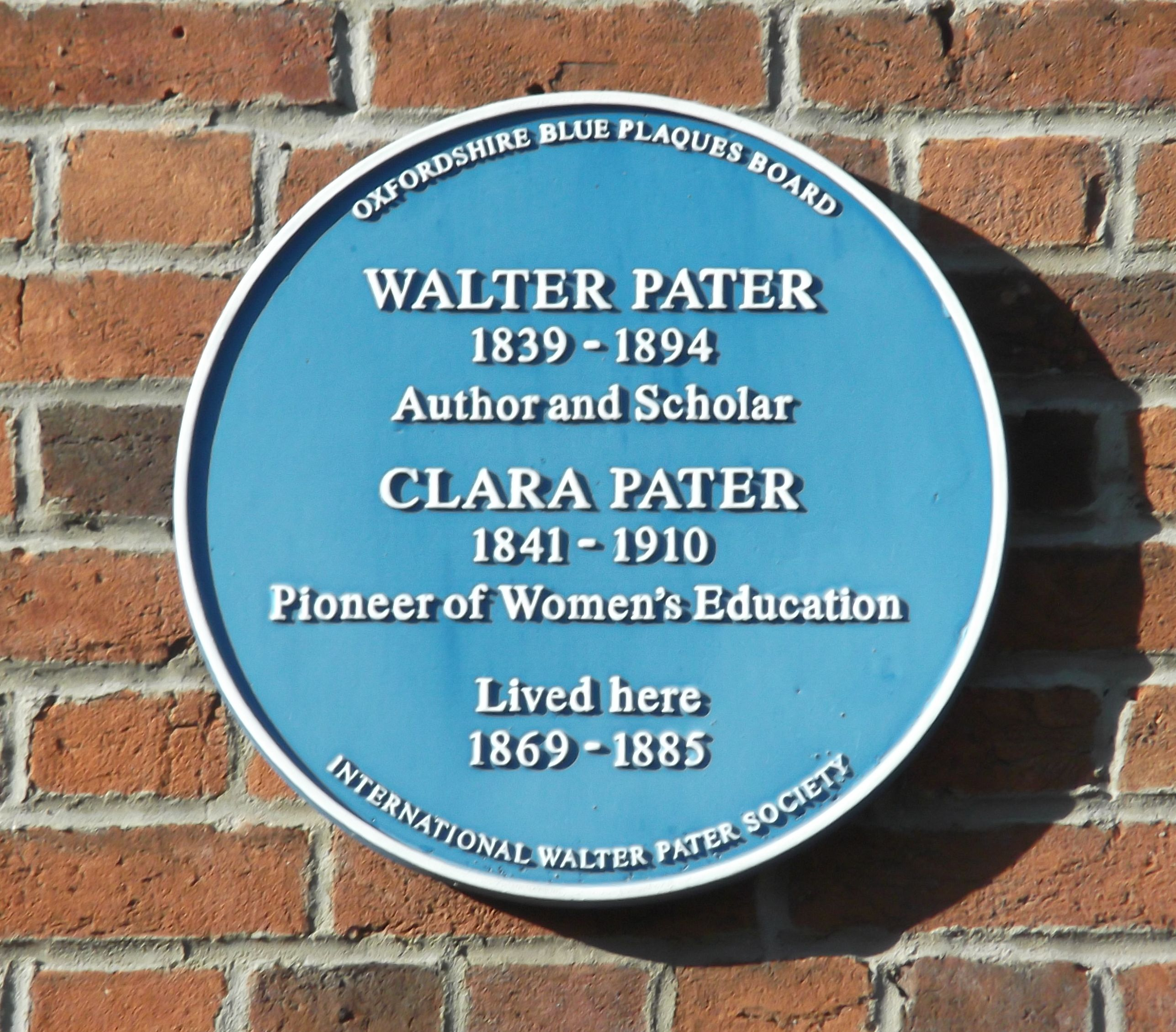
Plaque at 2 Bradmore Road, Oxford

Pater was now at the centre of a small but gifted circle in Oxford – he had tutored Gerard Manley Hopkins in 1866 and the two remained friends till September 1879 when Hopkins left Oxford – and he was gaining respect in the London literary world and beyond. Through Swinburne he met figures like Edmund Gosse, William Bell Scott, and Dante Gabriel Rossetti. He was an early friend and supporter of the young pre-Raphaelite painter Simeon Solomon. Conscious of his growing influence and aware that the 'Conclusion' to his Renaissance could be misconstrued as amoral, he withdrew the essay from the second edition in 1877 (he was to reinstate it with "slight changes" in the third in 1888 (Note: "Though they are slight in volume," wrote Geoffrey Tillotson in 1946, "they cannot be called slight in substance. Some of them change the values in sentences which use crucial terms like 'religion' and 'morality'. What was at first recommended to all as a system of life came to be recommended only to those included in the conveniently vague term 'children of this world'.")) and now set about clarifying and exemplifying his ideas through fiction.

To this end he published in 1878 in Macmillan's Magazine an evocative semi-autobiographical sketch titled 'Imaginary Portraits 1. The Child in the House', about some of the formative experiences of his childhood – "a work", as Pater's earliest biographer put it, "which can be recommended to anyone unacquainted with Pater's writings, as exhibiting most fully his characteristic charm." This was to be the first of a dozen or so "Imaginary Portraits", a genre and term Pater could be said to have invented and in which he came to specialise. These are not so much stories – plotting is limited and dialogue absent – as psychological studies of fictional characters in historical settings, often personifications of new concepts at turning-points in the history of ideas or emotion. Some look forward, dealing with innovation in the arts and philosophy; others look back, dramatising neo-pagan themes. Many are veiled self-portraits exploring dark personal preoccupations.

Planning a major work, Pater now resigned his teaching duties in 1882, though he retained his Fellowship and the college rooms he had occupied since 1864, and made a research visit to Rome. In his philosophical novel Marius the Epicurean (1885), an extended imaginary portrait set in the Rome of the Antonines, which Pater believed had parallels with his own century, he examines the "sensations and ideas" of a young Roman of integrity, who pursues an ideal of the "aesthetic" life – a life based on αἴσθησις, sensation, perception – tempered by asceticism. Leaving behind the religion of his childhood, sampling one philosophy after another, becoming secretary to the Stoic emperor Marcus Aurelius, Marius tests his author's theory of the stimulating effect of the pursuit of sensation and insight as an ideal in itself. The novel's opening and closing episodes betray Pater's continuing nostalgia for the atmosphere, ritual and community of the religious faith he had lost. Marius was favourably reviewed and sold well; a second edition came out in the same year. For the third edition (1892) Pater made extensive stylistic revisions.

In 1885, on the resignation of John Ruskin, Pater became a candidate for the Slade Professorship of Fine Art at Oxford University, but though in many ways the strongest of the field, he withdrew from the competition, discouraged by continuing hostility in official quarters. In the wake of this disappointment but buoyed by the success of Marius, he moved with his sisters from North Oxford (2 Bradmore Road), their home since 1869, to London (12 Earls Terrace, Kensington), where he was to live (outside term-time) till 1893.

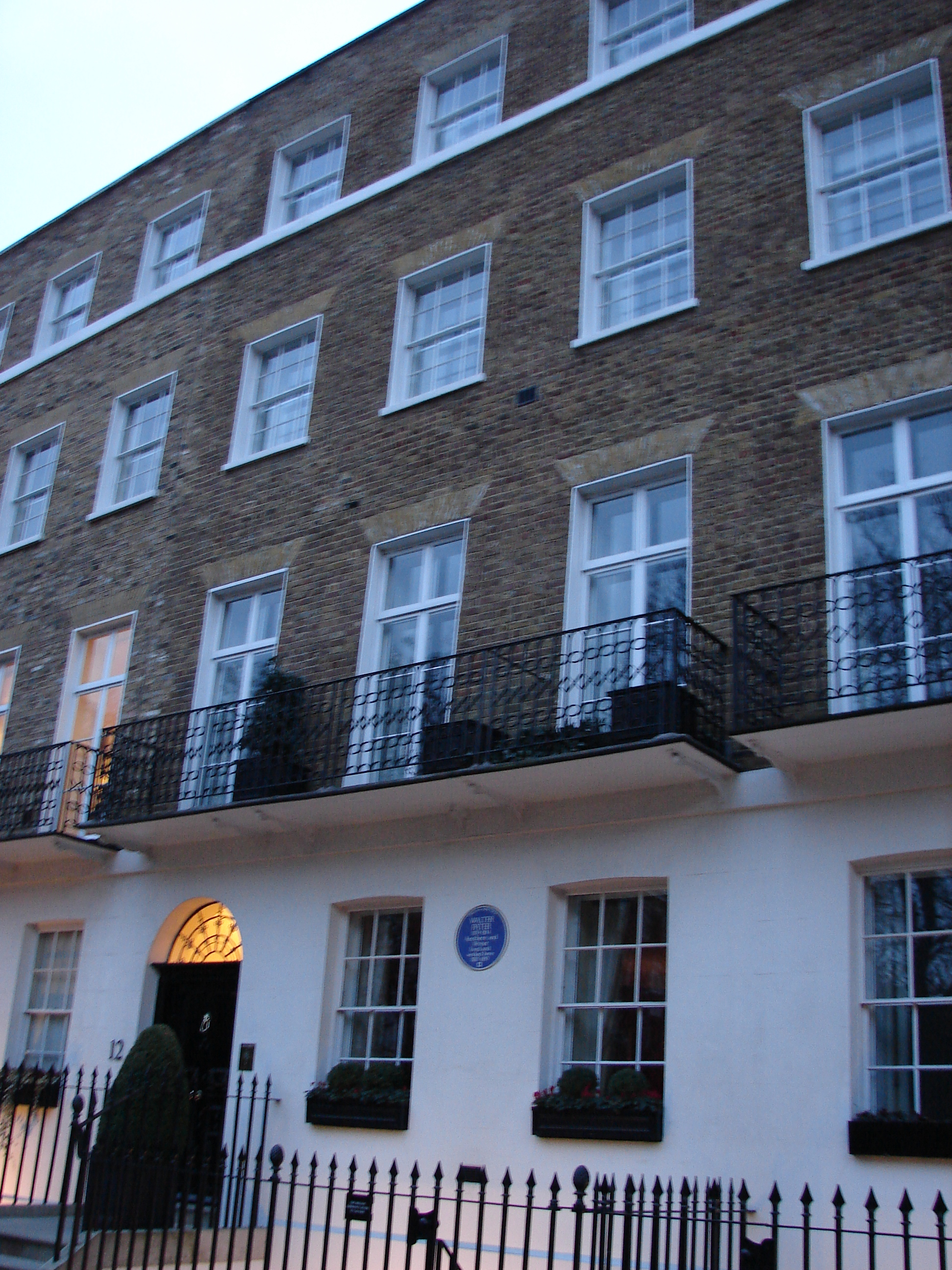
Walter Pater lived with his sisters at 12 Earls Terrace, Kensington (house with blue plaque) between 1885 and 1893.

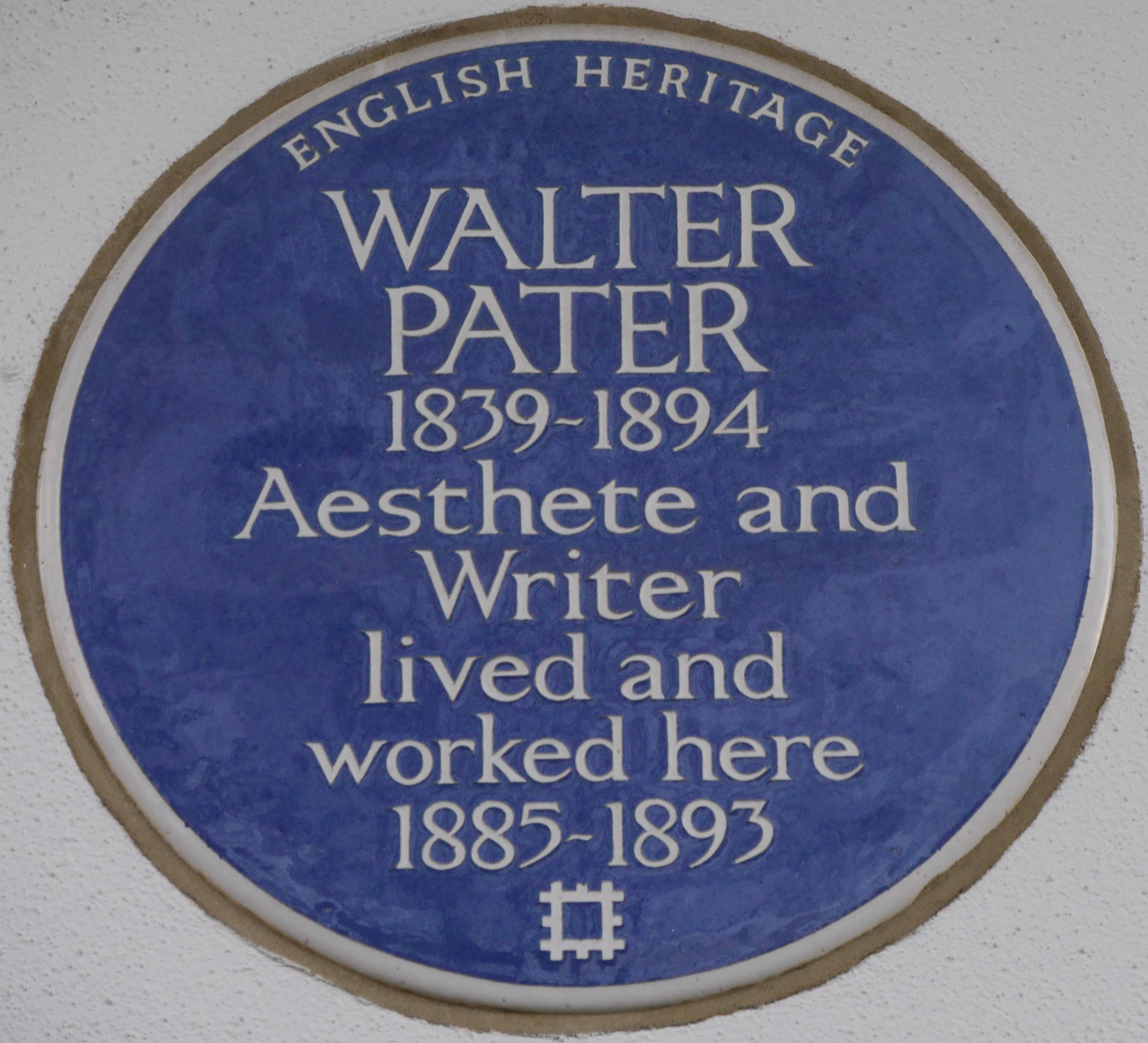
Blue plaque, 12 Earls Terrace, Kensington

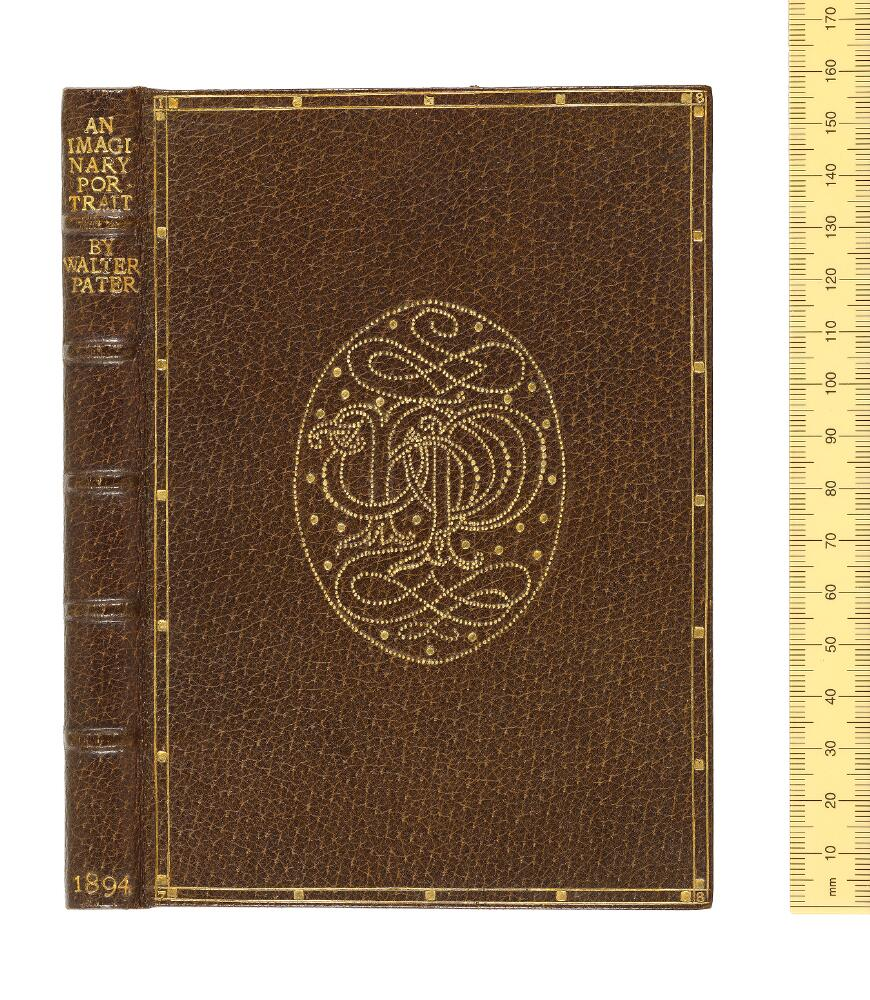
The Bodleian copy of An Imaginary Portrait (1894), re-bound for the Library in 1916 by Katharine Adams (1862–1952) with her cover-design

From 1885 to 1887, Pater published four new imaginary portraits in Macmillan's Magazine, each a study of misfits, men born out of their time, who bring disaster upon themselves – 'A Prince of Court Painters' (1885) (on Watteau and Jean-Baptiste Pater, with Pater's only female narrator), 'Sebastian van Storck' (March 1886) (17th-century Dutch society and painting, and the philosophy of Spinoza), 'Denys L'Auxerrois' (October 1886) (Dionysus and the medieval cathedral- and organ-builders), and 'Duke Carl of Rosenmold' (1887) (the German Enlightenment). These were collected in the volume Imaginary Portraits (1887; second edition, with stylistic revisions, 1890). Here Pater's examination of the tensions between tradition and innovation, intellect and sensation, asceticism and aestheticism, social mores and amorality, becomes increasingly complex. Implied warnings against the pursuit of extremes in matters intellectual, aesthetic or sensual are unmistakable. The second portrait, 'Sebastian van Storck', a powerful critique of philosophical solipsism, has been described as Pater's most subtle psychological study.

=== Appreciations, Plato and Platonism, and An Imaginary Portrait ===
In 1889 Pater published Appreciations, with an Essay on Style, a collection of previously-printed essays on literature. It was well received. 'Style' (reprinted from the Fortnightly Review, 1888) is a statement of his creed and methodology as a prose-writer, ending with the paradox "If style be the man, it will be in a real sense 'impersonal' ". The volume also includes an appraisal of the poems of Dante Gabriel Rossetti, first printed in 1883, a few months after Rossetti's death; 'Aesthetic Poetry', a revised version of the William Morris essay of 1868 minus its final paragraphs; and an essay on Thomas Browne, whose mystical, Baroque style Pater admired. The essay on Coleridge reprints 'Coleridge's Writings' (1866) but omits its explicitly anti-Christian passages; it adds paragraphs on Coleridge's poetry that Pater had contributed to T.H. Ward's The English Poets (1880). When he reworked his 1876 essay 'Romanticism' as the 'Postscript' to Appreciations, Pater removed its references to Baudelaire (now associated with the Decadent Movement), substituting Hugo's name in their place. In the second edition of Appreciations (1890) he suppressed the essay 'Aesthetic Poetry' – further evidence of his growing cautiousness in response to establishment criticism. All subsequent reprints of Appreciations ("to the dismay of every reader since 1890", as Gerald Monsman put it) have followed the second edition.

In 1893 Pater and his sisters returned to Oxford (64 St Giles, now the site of Blackfriars Hall, a permanent private hall of the University of Oxford). He was now in demand as a lecturer. In this year appeared his book Plato and Platonism. Here and in other essays on ancient Greece Pater relates to Greek culture the romanticism-classicism dialectic which he had first explored in his essay 'Romanticism' (1876). "All through Greek history," he writes, "we may trace, in every sphere of activity of the Greek mind, the action of these two opposing tendencies, the centrifugal and centripetal. The centrifugal – the Ionian, the Asiatic tendency – flying from the centre, throwing itself forth in endless play of imagination, delighting in brightness and colour, in beautiful material, in changeful form everywhere, its restless versatility driving it towards the development of the individual": and "the centripetal tendency", drawing towards the centre, "maintaining the Dorian influence of a severe simplification everywhere, in society, in culture". Harold Bloom noted that "Pater praises Plato for Classic correctness, for a conservative centripetal impulse, against his [Pater's] own Heraclitean Romanticism," but "we do not believe him when he presents himself as a centripetal man". The volume, which also includes a sympathetic study of ancient Sparta ('Lacedaemon', 1892), was praised by Jowett. "The change that occurs between Marius and Plato and Platonism," writes Anthony Ward, "is one from a sense of defeat in scepticism to a sense of triumph in it."

In the early summer of 1894 'The Child in the House' was for the first time issued in book form, in a limited edition of 250 copies, "reprinted with loving care" by the Daniel Press of Oxford, as An Imaginary Portrait, and described by Gosse as "a precious toy for bibliomaniacs". It sold out in under an hour. "I quite love your child," wrote Emily Daniel to Pater, presenting him with a copy. Pater in reply expressed pleasure in seeing his child "so daintily attired".

On 30 July 1894, Pater died suddenly in his Oxford home of heart failure brought on by rheumatic fever, at the age of 54. He was buried at Holywell Cemetery, Oxford.

=== Greek Studies, Miscellaneous Studies, Gaston de Latour and other posthumous volumes ===
In 1895, a friend and former student of Pater's, Charles Lancelot Shadwell, a Fellow and later Provost of Oriel, collected and published as Greek Studies Pater's essays on Greek mythology, religion, art and literature. This volume contains a reverie on the boyhood of Hippolytus, 'Hippolytus Veiled' (first published in Macmillan's Magazine in 1889), which has been called "the finest prose ever inspired by Euripides". In genre another "imaginary portrait", the sketch illustrates a paradox central to Pater's sensibility and writings: a leaning towards ascetic beauty apprehended sensuously. The volume also reprints Pater's 1876 'Study of Dionysus'.

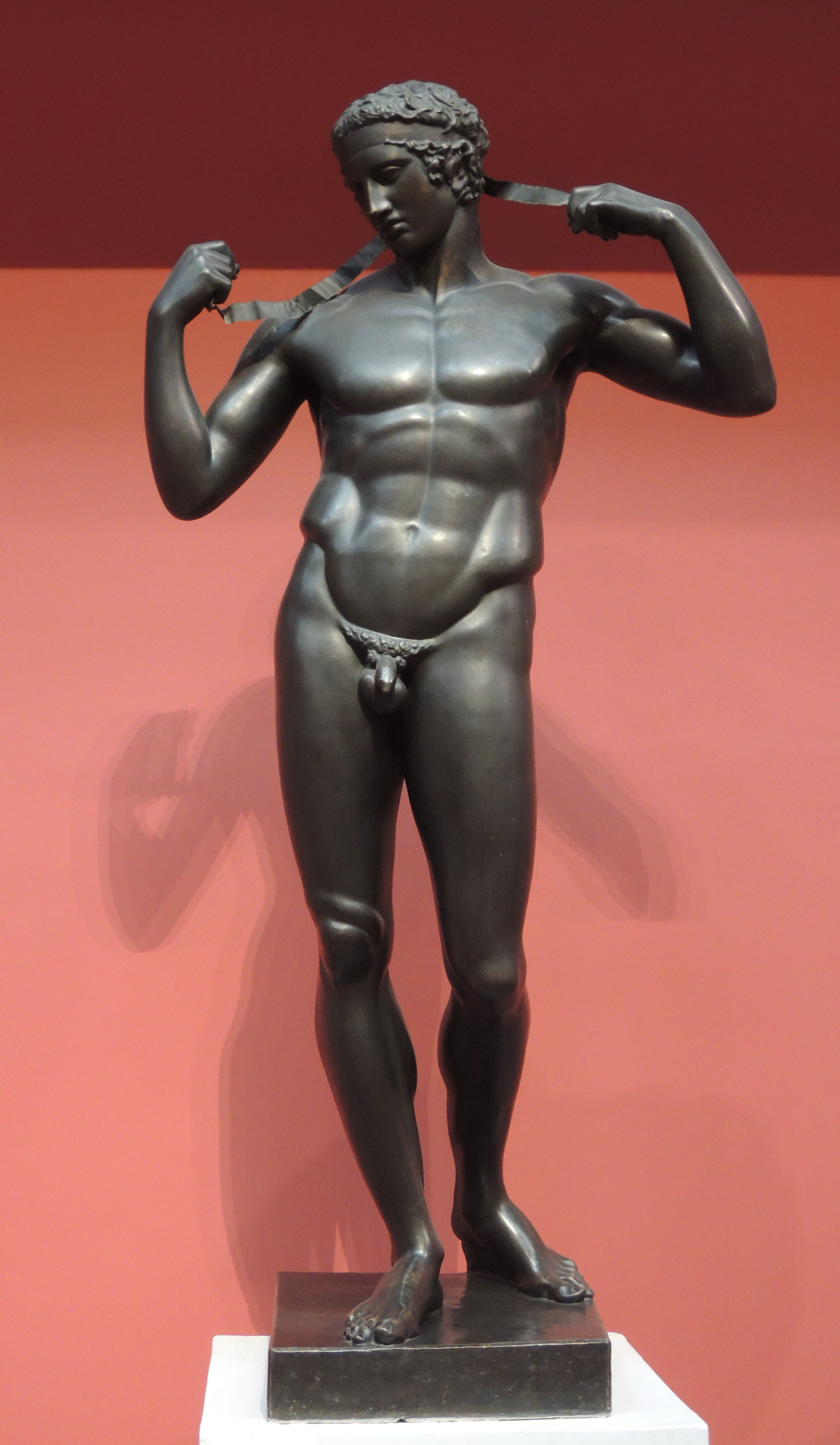
Copy of Polykleitos' 'Diadumenos', discussed by Pater in 'The Age of Athletic Prizemen' (1894)

In the same year Shadwell assembled other uncollected pieces and published them as Miscellaneous Studies. This volume contains 'The Child in the House' and another two obliquely self-revelatory Imaginary Portraits, 'Emerald Uthwart' (first published in The New Review in 1892) and 'Apollo in Picardy' (from Harper's Magazine, 1893) – the latter, like 'Denys L'Auxerrois', centering on a peculiarly Paterian preoccupation: the survival or reincarnation of pagan deities in the Christian era. Also included were Pater's last (unfinished) essay, on Pascal, and two pieces that point to a revival in Pater's final years of his earlier interest in Gothic cathedrals, sparked by regular visits to northern Europe with his sisters. Charles Shadwell "in his younger days" had been "strikingly handsome, both in figure and feature", "with a face like those to be seen on the finer Attic coins"; he had been the unnamed inspiration of an unpublished early paper of Pater's, 'Diaphaneitè' (1864), a tribute to youthful beauty and intellect, the manuscript of which Pater gave to Shadwell. This piece Shadwell also included in Miscellaneous Studies. Shadwell had accompanied Pater on his 1865 visit to Italy, and Pater was to dedicate The Renaissance to him and to write a preface to Shadwell's edition of The Purgatory of Dante Alighieri (1892).

In 1896 Shadwell edited and published seven chapters of Pater's unfinished novel Gaston de Latour, set in turbulent late 16th-century France, the product of the author's interest in French history, philosophy, literature, and art. Pater had conceived Marius as the first novel of "a trilogy of works of similar character dealing with the same problems, under altered historical conditions"; Gaston was to have been the second, while the third was to have been set in England in the late 18th century. In 1995 Gerald Monsman published Gaston de Latour: The Revised Text, re-editing the seven chapters and editing the remaining six which Shadwell and Clara Pater had withheld as too unfinished. "Through the imaginary portrait of Gaston and Gaston's historical contemporaries – Ronsard, Montaigne, Bruno, Queen Marguerite, King Henry III – Pater's fantasia confronts and admonishes the Yellow Nineties, Oscar Wilde not least." In an 1891 review of The Picture of Dorian Gray in The Bookman, Pater had disapproved of Wilde's distortion of Epicureanism: "A true Epicureanism aims at a complete though harmonious development of man's entire organism. To lose the moral sense therefore, for instance the sense of sin and righteousness, as Mr. Wilde's heroes are bent on doing so speedily, as completely as they can, is ... to become less complex, to pass from a higher to a lower degree of development."

Essays from The Guardian, edited by Gosse, a selection of Pater's anonymous 1886–1890 book-reviews from the journal also known as 'The Church Guardian', and an Uncollected Essays were privately printed in 1896 and 1903 respectively (the latter was republished as Sketches and Reviews in 1919). An Édition de luxe ten-volume Works of Walter Pater, with two volumes for Marius and including all but the pieces in Uncollected Essays, was issued in 1901; it was reissued, in plainer form, as the Library Edition in 1910. Pater's works were frequently reprinted until the late 1920s.

== Influence ==
Toward the end of his life Pater's writings were exercising a considerable influence. The principles of what would be known as the Aesthetic Movement were partly traceable to him, and his effect was particularly felt on one of the movement's leading proponents, Oscar Wilde, who paid tribute to him in The Critic as Artist (1891). Among art critics influenced by Pater were Bernard Berenson, Roger Fry, Kenneth Clark and Richard Wollheim: among early literary Modernists, Marcel Proust, James Joyce, W. B. Yeats, Paul Valéry, Ezra Pound, T. S. Eliot and Wallace Stevens; and Pater's influence can be traced in the subjective, stream-of-consciousness novels of the early 20th century. In literary criticism, Pater's emphasis on subjectivity and on the autonomy of the reader helped prepare the way for the revolutionary approaches to literary studies of the modern era. The Paterian sensibility is also apparent in the political philosophy of Michael Oakeshott. Among ordinary readers, idealists have found inspiration in his desire "to burn always with this hard, gemlike flame", in his pursuit of the "highest quality" in "moments as they pass."

== Critical method ==
Pater's critical method was outlined in the 'Preface' to The Renaissance (1873) and refined in his later writings. In the 'Preface', he argues initially for a subjective, relativist response to life, ideas, art, as opposed to the drier, more objective, somewhat moralistic criticism practised by Matthew Arnold and others. "The first step towards seeing one's object as it really is," Pater wrote, "is to know one's own impression, to discriminate it, to realise it distinctly. What is this song or picture, this engaging personality in life or in a book, to me?" When we have formed our impressions we proceed to find "the power or forces" which produced them, the work's "virtue". "Pater moves, in other words, from effects to causes, which are his real interest," noted Richard Wollheim. Among these causes are, pre-eminently, original temperaments and types of mind; but Pater "did not confine himself to pairing off a work of art with a particular temperament. Having a particular temperament under review, he would ask what was the range of forms in which it might find expression. Some of the forms will be metaphysical doctrines, ethical systems, literary theories, religions, myths. Pater's scepticism led him to think that in themselves all such systems lack sense or meaning – until meaning is conferred upon them by their capacity to give expression to a particular temperament."

Theory, hypothesis, beliefs depend a great deal on temperament; they are, so to speak, mere equivalents of temperament.

— Marius the Epicurean, Chapter XX.

== Style ==
Pater was much admired for his prose style, which he strove to make worthy of his aesthetic ideals, taking great pains and fastidiously correcting his work. He kept on his desk little squares of paper, each with its ideas, and shuffled them about attempting to form a sequence and pattern. "I have known writers of every degree, but never one to whom the act of composition was such a travail and an agony as it was to Pater," wrote Edmund Gosse, who also described Pater's method of composition: "So conscious was he of the modifications and additions which would supervene that he always wrote on ruled paper, leaving each alternate line blank." He would then make a fair copy and repeat the process, sometimes paying to have drafts printed, to judge their effect. "Unlike those who were caught by Flaubert's theory of the unique word and the only epithet," wrote Osbert Burdett, "Pater sought the sentence, and the sentence in relation to the paragraph, and the paragraph as a movement in the chapter. The numerous parentheses deliberately exchanged a quick flow of rhythm for pauses, for charming little eddies by the way." At the height of his powers as a writer, Pater discussed his principles of composition in the 1888 essay 'Style'. A. C. Benson called Pater's style "absolutely distinctive and entirely new", adding, however, that "it appeals, perhaps, more to the craftsman than to the ordinary reader." To G. K. Chesterton, Pater's prose, serene and contemplative in tone, suggested a "vast attempt at impartiality."

== Modern editions ==
- Pater, Walter (1964), Brzenk, Eugene J (ed.), Imaginary Portraits: a new collection, NY: Harper. Contains "An English Poet", The Fortnightly Review, 1931.
- ——— (1970), Evans, Lawrence (ed.), Letters, Oxford: Clarendon, ISBN 0-19-953507-8.
- ——— (1973), Uglow, Jennifer (ed.), Essays on Literature and Art, Everyman's Library, London: Dent. Includes several essays in their original periodical form.
- ——— (1980), Hill, Donald L (ed.), The Renaissance – Studies in Art and Poetry; the 1893 text, University of California Press. An annotated edition of Pater's revised text.
- ——— (1982) [1974], Bloom, Harold (ed.), Selected Writings, NY: Signet.
- ——— (1983), Bloom, Harold (ed.), Plato and Platonism, NY: Chelsea House.
- ——— (1986), Small, Ian (ed.), Marius the Epicurean, Oxford: World's Classics (facsimile of the 1934 Everyman's Library edition text, with new introduction and notes).
- ——— (1994) [1985], Levey, Michael (ed.), Marius the Epicurean, Middlesex: Penguin.
- ——— (1995), Monsman, Gerald (ed.), Gaston de Latour: The Revised Text, Greensboro: ELT Press; University of North Carolina.
- ——— (2010), Beaumont, Matthew (ed.), Studies in the History of the Renaissance, Oxford World's Classics, OUP, ISBN 978-0-19-953507-1, ISBN 0-19-953507-8. An annotated edition of the 1873 text.

=== The 'Oxford' Pater ===
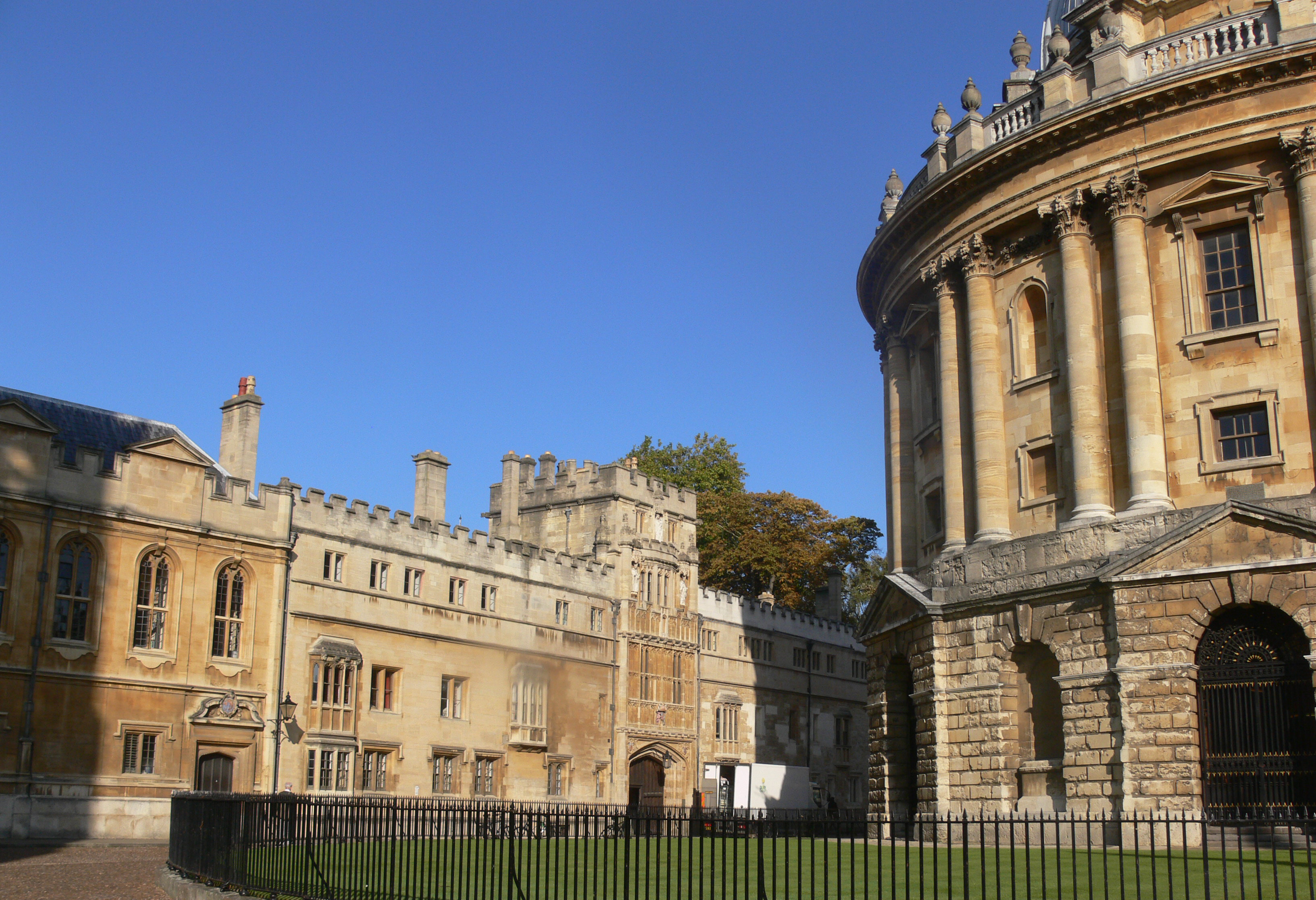
Brasenose College, Oxford (centre). Pater's rooms were on the upper floor above the oriel window, left.

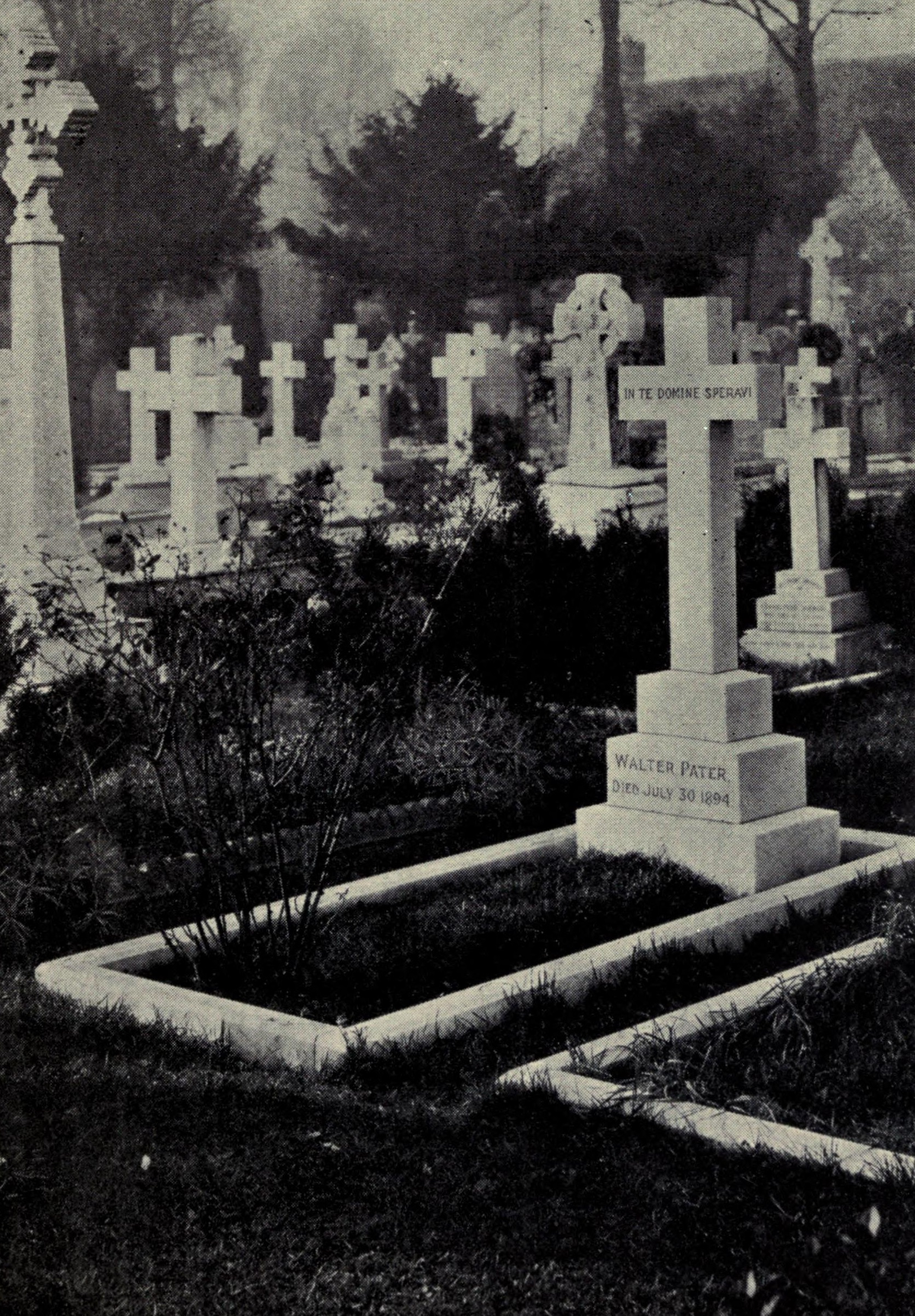
Pater's grave in Holywell Cemetery, Oxford (before 1907)

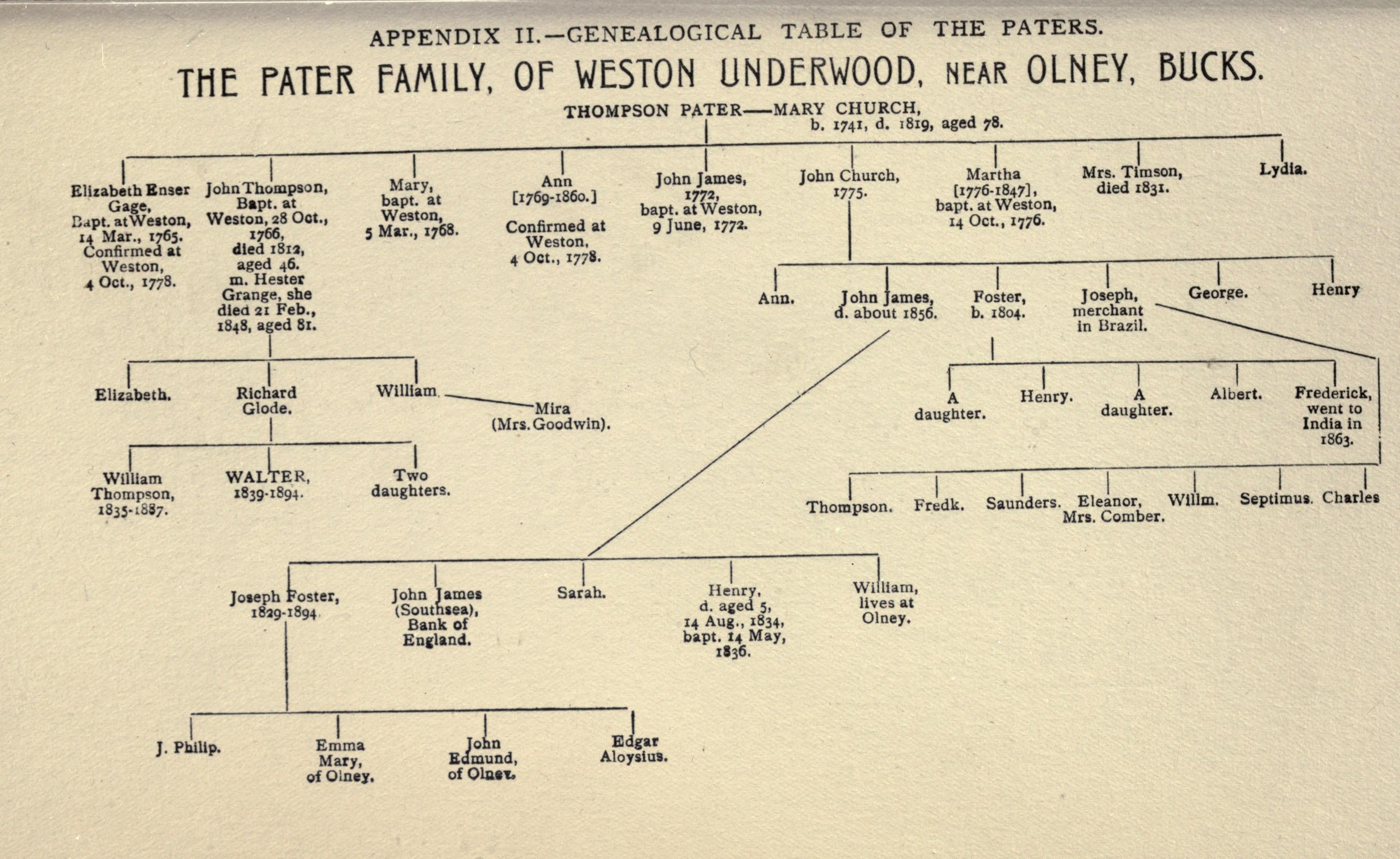
The Pater family tree, from Thomas Wright's biography, 1907

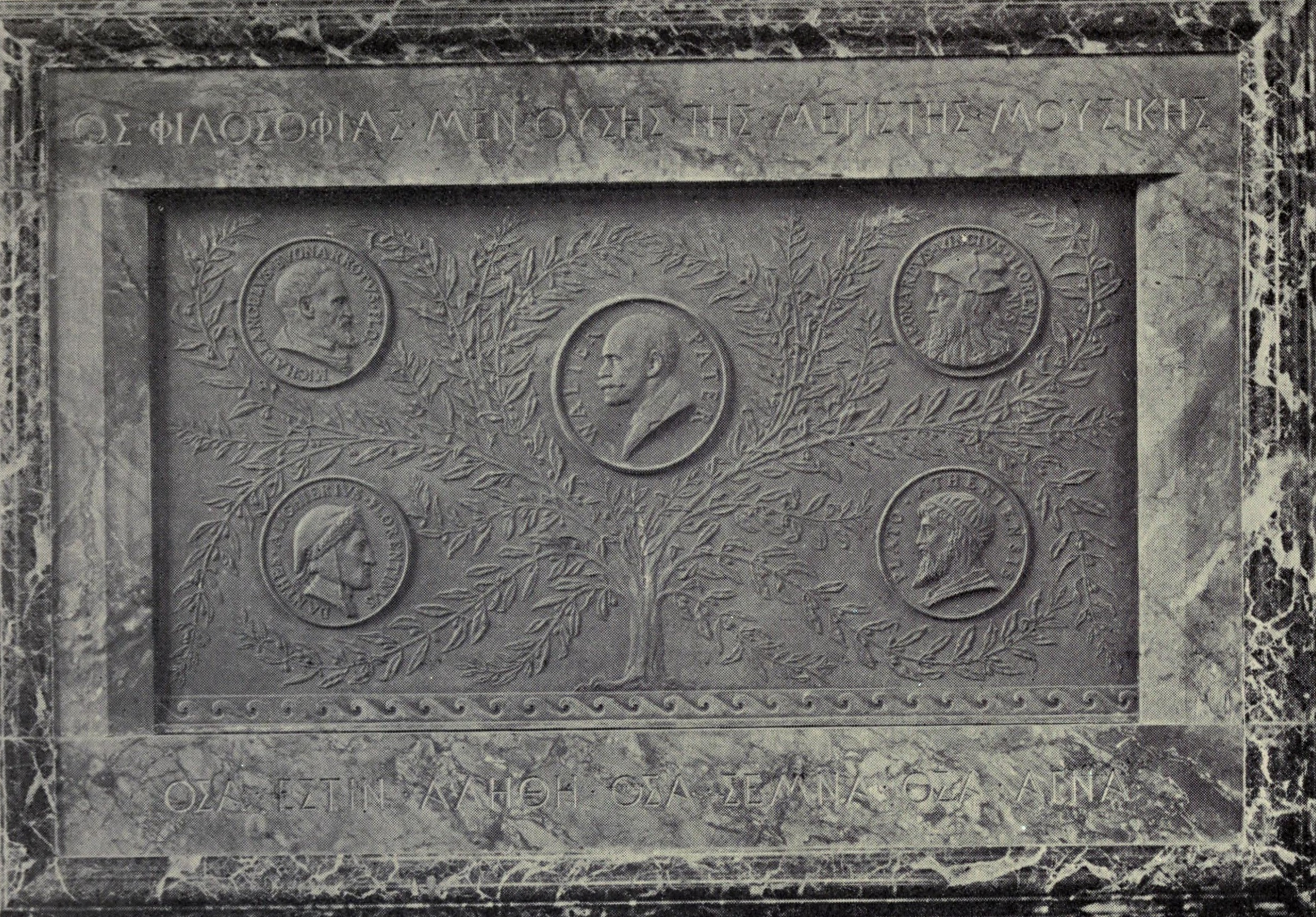
Memorial to Pater in Brasenose chapel: ὡς φιλοσοφίας μὲν οὔσης μεγίστης μουσικῆς... 'for the study of philosophy is the noblest and best of "music" ' (Socrates in Jowett's translation of Phaedo)

From 2019 the Oxford University Press began publishing its ten-volume Collected Works of Walter Pater, the first complete annotated edition. It prints Pater's latest revisions as the 'copy text', with earlier variants recorded in notes (the editors consider Pater a judicious reviser of his own work); and it includes periodical and academic articles left out of the 1901 and 1910 Works, Pater's Letters, and unpublished manuscript material.

- Vol. I. The Renaissance, ed. Fraser, Hilary (2026)
- Vol II. Marius the Epicurean ( — )
- Vol. III. Imaginary Portraits, ed. Ostermark-Johansen, Lene (2019) [nine Portraits]
- Vol. IV. Gaston de Latour, ed. Monsman, Gerald (2019)
- Vol. V. Studies and Reviews, 1864–1889, eds. Brake, Laurel, & Jakeman, Robyn (2027)
- Vol. VI. Appreciations; Studies and Reviews, 1890–1895 ( — )
- Vol. VII. Plato and Platonism ( — )
- Vol. VIII. Classical Studies, ed. Potolsky, Matthew (2020)
- Vol. IX. Correspondence, ed. Seiler, Robert (2023)
- Vol. X. Manuscripts ( — )

== In literature ==
- Arthur Conan Doyle uses Pater as a cultural marker in his 1898 novel The Tragedy of the Korosko. Discussing one of a party steaming up the Nile, he says "Mr. Cecil Brown...was a young diplomatist from a Continental Embassy, a man slightly tainted with the Oxford manner, and erring upon the side of unnatural and inhuman refinement, but full of interesting talk and cultured thought...He chose Walter Pater for his travelling author, and sat all day, reserved but affable, under the awning, with his novel and his sketch-book upon a camp-stool beside him."
- Wilde's Lord Henry Wotton in The Picture of Dorian Gray (1890) incessantly and willfully misquotes Pater's Renaissance and Marius.
- In W. Somerset Maugham's 'The Magician' (1908), Pater's reverie on the Mona Lisa is quoted by Oliver Haddo in his seduction of Margaret. (Penguin 1967 edition, pp 85–86).
- In talk among the young in Maugham's Of Human Bondage (1915), Pater is named as one of the few Victorians whose work done after forty should be saved from the bonfire. (Chapter 41)
- H. L Mencken in his work The American Language (1919) mentions Pater twice as a contrast to common English usage in Britain.
- Pater's The Renaissance is praised as a "wonderful new volume" in Edith Wharton's novel The Age of Innocence (1920), set in the 1870s.
- In Sinclair Lewis's Arrowsmith (1925) (chap. 1), Professor Gottlieb tells his medical students (in his accented English), "Before the next lab hour I shall be glad if you will read Pater's Marius the Epicurean, to derife [sic] from it the calmness which iss [sic] the secret of laboratory skill."
- In Maugham's 1939 novel Christmas Holiday, in a scene in the Louvre before the Mona Lisa (Chapter 8), "Mrs Mason, a faint enigmatic smile on her lips, in a low but thrilling voice repeated the celebrated lines that two generations ago wrought such havoc on the aesthetic young".
- Pater is referenced in Yukio Mishima's Forbidden Colors (1951), page 21 in the Alfred Marks translation. First edition, Knopf, New York, 1968.
- Citations from Pater's The Renaissance are sprinkled throughout Frederic Tuten's novel The Adventures of Mao on the Long March (1971).
- Lines from the 'Conclusion' to Pater's Renaissance are quoted among the sixth formers in Julian Mitchell's play Another Country (1982).
- Pater, with several of his colleagues, appears as a minor character in Tom Stoppard's play The Invention of Love (1997).
- Pater is the subject of a poem by Billy Collins titled 'The Great Walter Pater'.
- R. P. Lister poked gentle fun at Pater's ideas in his poem 'The Gemlike Flame'.

== Sources ==
- Bann, Stephen, ed. (2004), The Reception of Walter Pater in Europe, Thoemmes Continuum.
- Benson, A. C. (1906), Walter Pater, London: Macmillan.
- Cecil, David (1955), Walter Pater: the Scholar-Artist, Rede Lecture.
- Donoghue, Denis (1995), Walter Pater: Lover of Strange Souls, New York: Knopf.
- Gosse, Edmund (1896), "Walter Pater: A Portrait", Critical Kit-Kats, London: Heinemann.
- Hough, Graham (1949), The Last Romantics, London: Duckworth.
- Inman, Billie Andrew (1991), "Estrangement and Connection: Walter Pater, Benjamin Jowett, and William M. Hardinge" (PDF), Pater in the 1990s
- Levey, Michael (1978), The Case of Walter Pater (biography), London: Thames & Hudson.
- Sharp, W. (1912), Papers Critical and Reminiscent.
- Shuter, William F (1997), Rereading Walter Pater, Cambridge Studies in Nineteenth-Century Literature and Culture, Cambridge: Cambridge University Press, ISBN 0-521-01981-8
- Thomas, Edward (1913), Walter Pater: A Critical Study, London: Martin Secker
- Ward, Anthony (1966), Walter Pater: The Idea in Nature, London: MacGibbon and Kee.
- Wright, S (1975), A Bibliography of the Writings of Walter H. Pater.
- Wright, Thomas (1907), The Life of Walter Pater, London: Everett & Co..
