= Earls Terrace =

Street in Kensington, London

Coordinates: 51.4979°N 0.2013°W

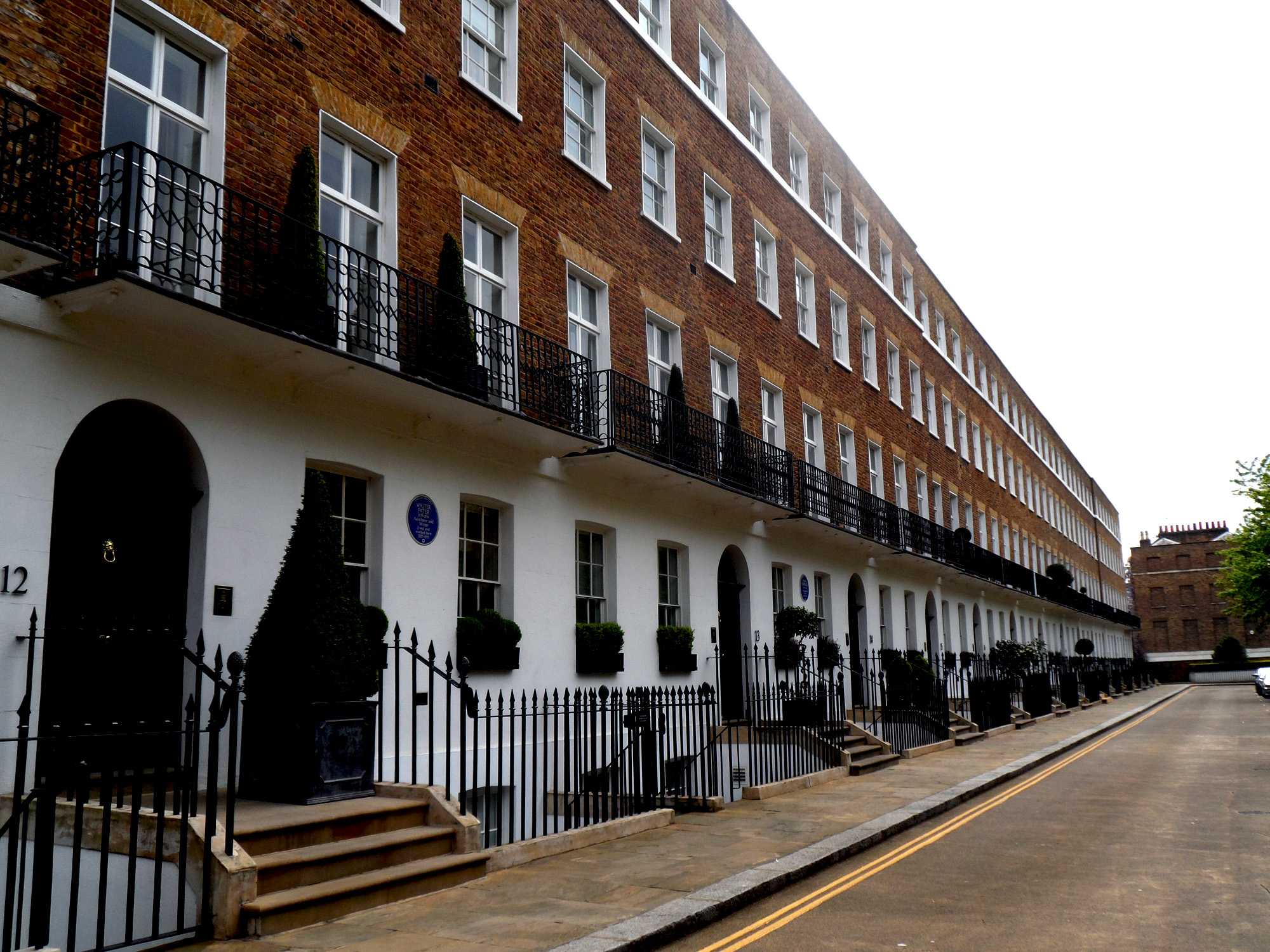
Earls Terrace, 2015

Earls Terrace is a street in Kensington, London, W8. It has houses on one side only, a terrace of 25 Georgian houses, built in 1800–1810, all of which are Grade II listed. Numbers 1 and 25, at the ends of the terrace, are converted into flats.

The street overlooks Kensington High Street, with a grass and garden in front, and backs onto Edwardes Square.

The entire terrace of 23 houses was redeveloped by Northacre, adding underground parking and "leisure facilities" that include swimming pools.

The communal garden is 0.5057 hectares (1.250 acres) in size, and is not open to the public.

== Notable residents ==
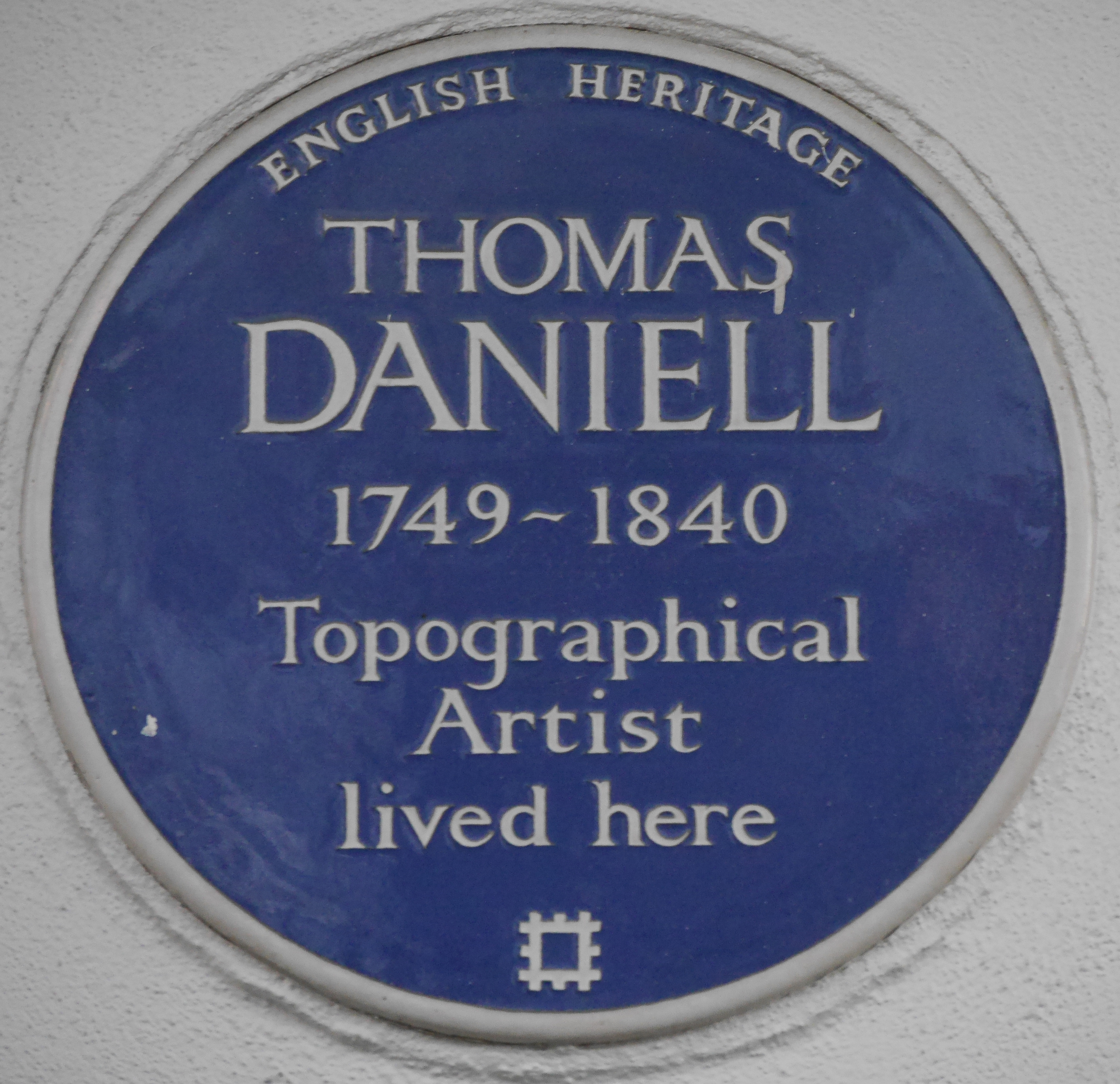
Blue plaque, 14 Earls Terrace

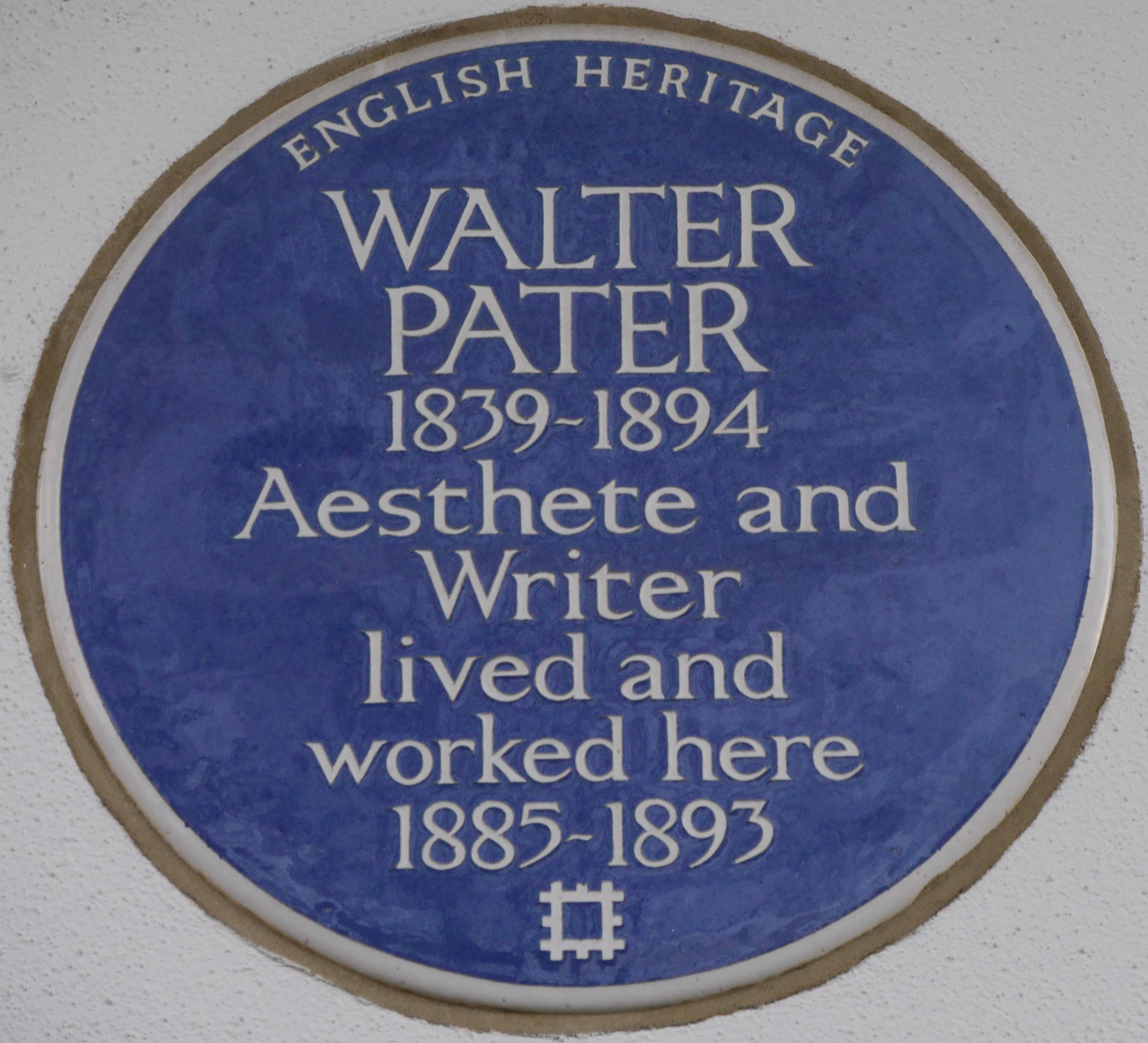
Blue plaque, 12 Earls Terrace

The pop singer Madonna once rented there, and children's author J. K. Rowling had a home there in 2001. The former KGB spy Alexander Lebedev and his son Evgeny Lebedev lived in one of the houses in the terrace.

- No. 1: Actors Peter Wyngarde and Alan Bates shared a flat at no. 1 for some years in the 1960s.
- No. 4: Actor and author Elizabeth Inchbald lodged here in 1816. Her landlady was a Miss Hodges.
- No. 10: George Ledwell Taylor, English architect, lived here in 1819–1820.
- No. 11: William Haseldine Pepys, founder of the London Institution, lived here in 1836–1856.
- No. 12: Walter Pater (1839—1894), essayist, literary and art critic, and writer of fiction, lived at no. 12 from 1885 to 1893. George du Maurier, English novelist, author of the 1894 novel Trilby and cartoonist for Punch, also lived here in 1867–1870. George MacDonald (1824–1905), Scottish author, poet, Christian minister, lived here from September 1863 to 1867. Amongst his many guests were John Ruskin and Lewis Carroll. MacDonald's family had already read a draft of Alice’s Adventures Under Ground and encouraged Carroll to publish it as he records in his Diary for May 9, 1863. In 1865 Alice's Adventures in Wonderland was finally published.
- No. 14: Thomas Daniell (1749–1840), English landscape painter, lived and died at no. 14.
- No. 20: George Thomas Robinson (1827–1897), architect, lived and died at no. 20.
- No. 25: Ian McKellen (born 1939), actor lived at no. 25 from 1964 to 1972, with his then lover Brian Taylor, a history schoolteacher from Bolton.
- Francis Ludlow Holt (1780–1844), legal and dramatic author, died at Earls Terrace.
- Joseph Hirst Lupton (1836–1905), schoolmaster, cleric and writer, died at Earls Terrace.
- The playwrights Sir Peter Shaffer and Anthony Shaffer playwrights lived here, their father owned 12 buildings (12-24).
