= William Money Hardinge =

English poet and author

William Money Hardinge (17 May 1854 – 17 November 1916) was an English poet and author.

The son of Dr Henry Hardinge of London, William received his education at Westminster and Oxford. During his time at Balliol, he gained a reputation as a romantic homosexual and aesthete, acquiring the nickname of the 'Balliol Bugger'. He had a controversial relationship with the essayist Walter Pater, for which he was sent down for nine months. In 1876, at the age of 21, he won the Newdigate Prize for his work Troy and recited his poem at the Sheldonian Theatre, June 21, 1876. In the 1880s he turned to writing novels with heterosexual romantic themes.

== Bibliography ==
- Chrysanthema: Gathered from the Greek Anthology (1878)
- Clifford Gray: A Romance of Modern Life (1881)
- Eugenia: an Episode (1883)
- The Willow-Garth (1886)
- Out of the Fog (1888)
