= Clara Pater =

Clara Ann Pater (bap. 1841–1910) was an English scholar, a tutor, and a pioneer and early reformer of women's education.

Pater contributed to the growing movement for educational equality among women of the Victorian era as they began to graduate from and contribute to institutions of higher education that had traditionally been all-male. Pater served on multiple committees, such as Louise Creighton's Committee of Oxford Lectures for Ladies and the Association for Promoting the Higher Education of Women in Oxford. Pater taught Greek, Latin, and German at Somerville College from 1879, and served as the first resident tutor from 1885. She became the vice principal of Somerville in 1886. Vera Brittain described her as representing the "quintessence of Oxford aestheticism" in her dress and appearance, a movement with which her brother was closely associated.

After the death of her brother, essayist and Renaissance scholar Walter Pater in 1894, Clara Pater moved to Kensington, London, where she resumed teaching as a tutor of Latin and Greek at the King's Ladies’ Department. According to the King's College Magazine, Pater was widely lauded for her passion and her knowledge of the highest and noblest pieces of literature, and had a lasting impact on her students. It was during her time at King's College that Miss Pater become a private tutor to Virginia Woolf.

Pater tutored Virginia Woolf from 1899 to 1900, and was described by Woolf as "perfectly delightful". Pater's teachings of Greek language and culture, along with the lessons she had with Janet Case contributed greatly to Woolf's views on the female's exclusion from education, female authorship, homoeroticism, and literature in general. Miss Pater is thought to have served as an inspiration for Miss Julia Craye in Woolf's 1928 short story, “Moments of Being: ‘Slater's Pins Have No Points’" as well as Lucy Craddock, Kitty Malone's tutor in the novel The Years.
