= Frederic Tuten =

American novelist

- Born: December 2, 1936 (age 89); Bronx, New York City, US
- Education: City College of New York; National Autonomous University of Mexico; New York University (PhD)
- Occupations: Novelist; short story writer; essayist; artist
- Writing career
- Period: 1964–present
- Website: www.frederictuten.com

Frederic Tuten (born December 2, 1936) is an American novelist, short story writer and essayist. He has written five novels – The Adventures of Mao on the Long March (1971), Tallien: A Brief Romance (1988), Tintin in the New World : A Romance (1993), Van Gogh's Bad Café (1997) and The Green Hour (2002) – as well as one book of inter-related short stories, Self-Portraits: Fictions (2010), and essays, many of the latter being about contemporary art. His memoir My Young Life (2019) was published by Simon & Schuster. In 2022, he published a collection of short stories, The Bar at Twilight, and On a Terrace in Tangier, a book of Tuten's drawings, each drawing accompanied by a short story. Tuten received a Guggenheim Fellowship for Fiction and was given the Award for Distinguished Writing from the American Academy of Arts and Letters. He was awarded four Pushcart Prizes and one O. Henry Prize.

== Biography ==
Tuten was born in The Bronx, New York City, on December 2, 1936. He is the son of a Sicilian mother and a French-Huguenot father and was raised in an impoverished but book-cultured family, in the Pelham Parkway neighborhood.

Tuten received his undergraduate degree from the City College of New York. After studying pre-Columbian art history at the National Autonomous University of Mexico and travelling through South America, writing on Brazilian cinema, he earned a Ph.D. in 19th-century American literature from New York University, concentrating on Melville, Whitman, and James Fenimore Cooper, and taught literature and American cinema in France at the University of Paris VIII: Vincennes—Saint-Denis.

Tuten spent 15 years heading the graduate program in creative writing at the City College of New York, which he co-founded. In that capacity, he championed the work of students Walter Mosley, Oscar Hijuelos, Philip Graham (writer), Aurelie Sheehan, Salar Abdoh, Ernesto Quiñonez, and many others. He taught classes on experimental writing at The New School. He was on the board of advisors for Guernica Magazine and executive editor of Smyles & Fish. Tuten's short fiction has appeared in Granta, Conjunctions, Fence, Fiction, The New Review of Literature, Tri-Quarterly, BOMB, and Harper's Magazine. In 1973, he received a Guggenheim Fellowship for Creative Writing and in 2001 was given the Award for Distinguished Writing from the American Academy of Arts and Letters.

Tuten has worked as an art and film critic in various venues such as the New York Times and Artforum and often incorporates allusions to these fields in his fiction as well. Tuten was a close friend of the artist Roy Lichtenstein and published several essays on his work, as well as catalogue essays for many other artists including John Baldessari, Ross Bleckner, Eric Fischl, R. B. Kitaj, and David Salle.

=== Personal life ===
In 1962, Tuten married fellow writer Simona Morini; they divorced in 1972. In 1996, he married Elke Krajewska.

Tuten is a longtime resident of Manhattan's East Village.

== Works ==
=== Novels ===
Tuten's first novel, The Adventures of Mao on the Long March (1971), a fictionalized account of Chairman Mao's rise to power, is highly experimental in nature. It contains Faulkneresque changes in narrative and lengthy fictional conversations with Mao that read like journalistic interviews. The story first appeared in 1969 in a 39-page condensed form in the magazine Artist Slain. The novel in its entirety was subsequently published by Citadel Press in 1971, and re-released in 2005 by New Directions. In 1988, The Philadelphia Inquirer noted that the book "was hailed as a modernist classic, with high praise from such differing sensibilities as Susan Sontag and John Updike."

The cover of Mao features original artwork by Roy Lichtenstein. This is fitting for Tuten whom, in life as in his novels, has a keen interest in artistic criticism (particularly with regard to painting). Tuten himself was actually used as a model for the drawing, which Lichtenstein altered accordingly to resemble Mao.

His next novel, Tallien: A Brief Romance (1988), is also about a historical figure. Jean Lambert Tallien was a high-ranking figure in the French Revolution, serving as the president of the Constitutional Convention and a member of the Committee of Public Safety. Like Mao, Tallien was a member of the common classes who rose to the upper crust of the revolutionary ranks.

Tuten tells the story of Tallien's courtship and marriage to Therese, a condemned member of the French aristocracy. When eyebrows are raised by Tallien's show of clemency, Tuten describes in minute organizational detail the sometimes-banal and sometimes-bloody bureaucratic struggle that ensues. The narrative is intercut with the author's account of his own father's life, demonstrating a literary mechanism similar to that used in The Adventures of Mao.

Reviewing the novel in The Palm Beach Post, Gary Schwam wrote: "Tuten tells this tale swiftly and vividly . . . This sharp, daring little novel is another report from the political and emotional gulag, another attempt to help us remember."

Tintin in the New World (1993) is a critically acclaimed work. The novel's protagonist is Tintin, the cartoon boy detective created by Belgian artist Georges Remi, better known as Hergé. Tuten transplants Tintin from his comic book confines into a fleshed out, realistic world. Characters from Thomas Mann's The Magic Mountain also appear in Tuten's novel.

The cover of this novel also features a drawing by Roy Lichtenstein, which was created expressly for the novel. Again, Lichtenstein makes use of the benday dot technique to depict Tintin and his dog Snowy in a near-miss with a would-be assassin's knife. Behind the seated Tintin hangs the painting Dance (I) by Henri Matisse, which in reality is displayed in the Museum of Modern Art in New York City. Roy Lichtenstein's own rendering of Dance, sans Tintin, hangs in the same museum.

Writing in The New York Times Book Review, Edmund White called Tintin in the New World "queerly beautiful" and said that in the novel Tuten "shows that by tapping the energy of Hergé's archetypes he has, surprisingly, been able to make a statement more personal than autobiography."

The book went through several print runs, both in the United States and the UK (in Britain, the novel was published by Marion Boyars Publishers, and later Minerva). The novel was also translated into French, German, Dutch, Spanish, Catalan, and Swedish. In 2005, it was re-released by Black Classics Press in the US, with an introduction by Paul LaFarge. All editions of the book feature the Interior with Painting of Tintin jacket illustration created by Lichtenstein.

Like Mao and Tallien, Tuten's next novel, Van Gogh's Bad Café (1997), offers an imagined glimpse into the psyche of a historical character, Dutch artist Vincent van Gogh. The book is also similar to Mao in that the time and place of action and the narrator are inconsistent throughout and change without warning. Van Gogh's Bad Café explores the themes of love and addiction.

In his review in The Los Angeles Times, Richard Eder wrote, "In 'Van Gogh's Bad Cafe,' his finest book, Tuten has brought to fruition what I think he was aiming at in the diverting but self-conscious 'Tintin.' His message about the end of art has become a work of art and almost too sad to bear."

In Tuten's most recent novel, The Green Hour (2002), the setting is the present day, and the characters are not borrowed from history. The story recounts the 30-year love affair between an academic and a spiritual vagabond.

Several of Frederic Tuten's novels and short stories feature a cat named Nicolino.

=== "The Collagists" ===
In 2007 Tuten was asked by literary website Smyles and Fish, along with lifelong friend Jerome Charyn, to write an essay about their former colleague and friend Donald Barthelme. The project evolved into a lengthy article, which offers a sort of collage of these three writers and the world of their influences. The work is divided into three parts – an introductory essay on the project by editor-in-chief Iris Smyles, Charyn's essay on Barthelme, and Tuten's piece "My Autobiography: Portable with Images", into which Tuten embedded illustrations by Max Ernst and quotes from Barthelme's works.

=== Memoir ===
In March 2019, Tuten published his memoir My Young Life with Simon & Schuster. Spanning 1944–1965, My Young Life follows Tuten from The Bronx to Greenwich Village, with side trips to Mexico City and Syracuse, as he chases his artistic and literary aspirations. It was reviewed in The New Yorker, Kirkus Reviews, Publishers Weekly, and Booklist. It was selected as an Editor's Choice at BOMB Magazine.

There are no villains in this book, no one recalled unkindly — not the women who broke Tuten’s heart, not even the Southern father who abandoned the 11-year-old Tuten and his Italian mother, leaving them to fend for themselves in the small Bronx apartment they shared with the writer’s maternal grandmother. [A] perspicacious generosity colors the entire book….

— Charles Taylor, "Freddie Outside the Bronx: Frederic Tuten's My Young Life", Los Angeles Review of Books (March 19. 2019)

=== Short story collections ===
In 2010, Tuten published Self Portraits: Fictions a collection of interrelated short stories that create a portrait of Tuten's life, both real and imagined.

The author's 2022 short story collection The Bar at Twilight was praised in The New York Times Book Review: "Tuten's prose is always vital, often dazzling . . . "The Bar at Twilight" is neither normative nor predictable, and it bears the firm impress of the soul."

=== On a Terrace in Tangier ===
In 2022, Tuten released On a Terrace in Tangier, a book of drawings, each with its own short story. In New York Magazine: Vulture, Jerry Saltz wrote,

"Frederic Tuten's works feature visionary scenes drawn from a fertile and ungovernable imagination. Executed in an awkward yet assured cartoonish style, with undertones of Arshile Gorky's teeming amorphic graphic fields, his paintings employ pigment, shape, and scene as a form of abstract language."

=== Short stories ===
- "My Autobiography : Portable, with Commentary", Conjunctions 40, Spring 2003.
- "In the Borghese Gardens," The New Review of Literature Vol. 1, October 2003.

Tuten's first collection of short stories entitled Self Portraits: Fictions was published by W. W. Norton on September 13, 2010, and includes the following stories:

- "The Park Near Marienbad", Conjunctions 42, Spring 2004.
- "Voyagers", Conjunctions 44, Spring 2005.
- "The Park in Winter," Fence Vol.8, Summer 2005.
- "The Ship at Anchor", Granta 91, September 2005.
- "Self Portrait with Icebergs ", KGB Bar Lit, 2005.
- "Self Portrait with Cheese", "Roy Lichtenstein: Conversations with Surrealism, Exhibition Catalogue: Mitchell-Innes & Nash, October 2005; reprinted in Smyles & Fish 1, Fall 2006.
- "Self Portrait with Beach", Mona Kuhn : Evidence, 2007 ISBN 3-86521-372-3; reprinted in Conjunctions 48, Spring 2007, and in Harper's, August 2007;
- "Self Portrait with Sicily," Conjunctions, Spring 2008.
- "The Bar on Tompkins Square Park: Self Portrait with Blue Horse", BOMB Magazine, Summer 2009.
- "The Park on Fire"
- "Self Portrait with Circus"
- "Self Portrait with Bullfight"

=== Essays ===
- "Trova." Arts Mag., XLIII (December 1968 – January 1969), 32–33.
- "Roy Lichtenstein Bronze Sculpture 1976–1989." 65 Thompson Street, 1989.
- "Twenty-Five Years After : The Adventures of Mao on the Long March." Archipelago, 1997.
- Tuten, Frederic (1997). "David Salle: At the Edges". Art in America. 85 (9). F.F. Sherman: 78..
- "Still Replying to Grandma's Persistent 'And Then?'" Writers on Writing (2002). - reprinted as a prologue to the short story collection Self Portraits: Fictions
- Tuten, Frederic (May 2005). "An Excerpt from Tintin in the New World". Guernica Magazine. Archived from the original on September 27, 2007.
- Frederic Tuten / December Guest Editor. Guernica Magazine, 2006. Frederic Tuten comments on fiction from four selected writers whose work he edited for Guernica Magazine.

=== Other writings ===
Tuten has contributed to the following books:

- R.B. Kitaj Pictures. Marlborough Gallery, 1974.
- Roy Lichtenstein: Water Lilies. Richard Gray Gallery, 1992.
- David Salle. Gagosian Gallery, 1999.
- Roy Lichtenstein: Early Black and White Paintings. Gagosian Gallery, 2002.
- Eric Fischl: Paintings And Drawings 1979-2001. Hatje Cantz, 2003. ISBN 3-7757-1379-4
- John Baldessari. Ecole normale supérieure des beaux-arts, 2005. ISBN 2-84056-200-6
- Roy Lichtenstein: Conversations With Surrealism. Mitchell-Innes & Nash, 2006. ISBN 0-9749607-4-8

Tuten also co-wrote the 1981 cult movie Possession with its director, Andrzej Żuławski.
