= Marius the Epicurean =

1885 philosophical novel by Walter Pater

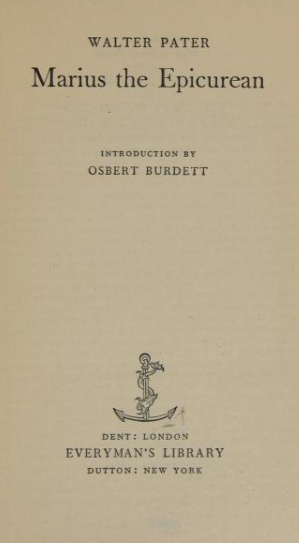
- Title page for Marius the Epicurean (1885)
- Author: Walter Pater
- Language: English
- Genre: Philosophical novel
- Publication date: March 1885
- Publication place: United Kingdom

Marius the Epicurean: his sensations and ideas is a historical and philosophical novel by Walter Pater (his only completed full-length fiction), written between 1881 and 1884, published in 1885 and set in 161–177 AD, in the Rome of the Antonines. It explores the intellectual development of its protagonist, a young Roman of integrity, in his pursuit of a congenial religion or philosophy at a time of change and uncertainty that Pater likened to his own era. The narration is third-person, slanted from Marius's point of view, added to which are various interpolated discourses, ranging from adaptations of classical and early Christian writings to Marius’s diary and authorial comment.

== Plot summary ==
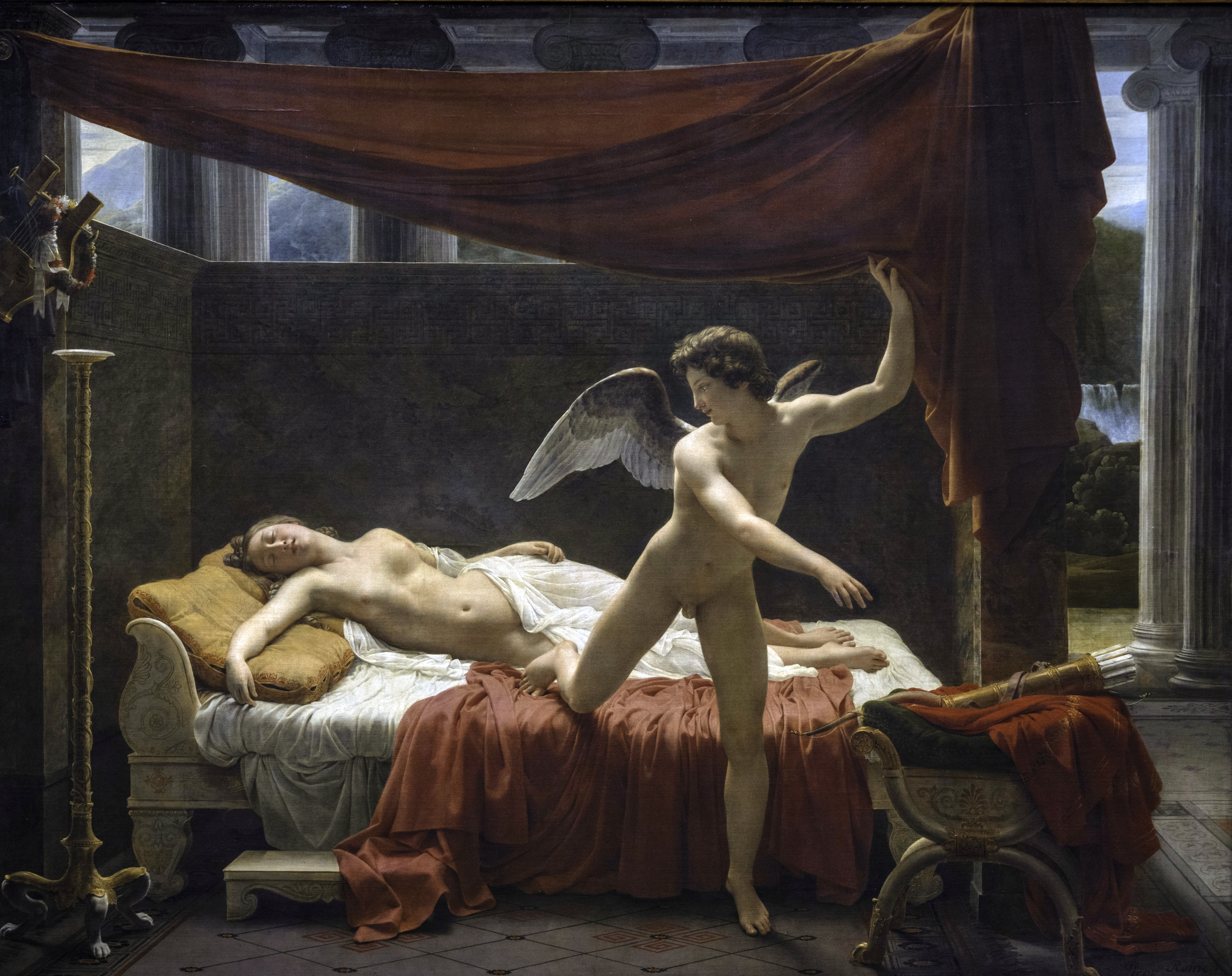
Cupid and Psyche by François-Edouard Picot (1817). Pater's much-admired translation of Apuleius's "Cupid and Psyche" is one of the interpolated texts in Marius the Epicurean

Marius, a sensitive only child of a patrician family, growing up near Luna in rural Etruria, is impressed by the traditions and rituals of the ancestral religion of the Lares, by his natural surroundings, and by a boyhood visit to a sanctuary of Aesculapius. His childhood ends with the death of his mother (he had early lost his father) and with his departure for boarding school in Pisae.

As a youth he is befriended by and falls under the influence of a brilliant, hedonistic older boy, Flavianus, who awakens in him a love of literature (the two read with delight the story of Cupid and Psyche in Apuleius, and Pater in due course makes Flavian, who is "an ardent student of words, of the literary art", the author of the Pervigilium Veneris). Flavian falls ill during the Festival of Isis and Marius tends him during his long death-agony (end of 'Part the First').

Grown to manhood, Marius now embraces the philosophy of the 'flux' of Heraclitus and the Epicureanism (or Cyrenaicism) of Aristippus. He journeys to Rome (166 AD), encountering by chance on the way a blithesome young knight, Cornelius, who becomes a friend. Marius explores Rome in awe, and, "as a youth of great attainments in Greek letters and philosophy", is appointed amanuensis to the Emperor Marcus Aurelius. Aurelius's Meditations on Stoicism and on Plato, and the public lectures of the rhetorician Fronto, open Marius' eyes to the narrowness of Epicureanism. Aurelius's indifference, however, to the cruelty to animals in the amphitheatre, and later to the torments inflicted on people there, causes Marius to question the values of Stoicism (end of 'Part the Second').

Disillusioned with Rome and the imperial court which seem "like some stifling forest of bronze-work, transformed as if by malign enchantment out of the living trees", puzzled by the source of Cornelius's serenity, still Epicurean by temperament but seeking a more satisfying life-philosophy, Marius makes repeated visits alone to the Campagna and Alban Hills, on one occasion experiencing in the Sabine Hills a sort of spiritual "epiphany" on a perfect day of peace and beauty (end of 'Part the Third').

Later he is taken by Cornelius to a household in the Campagna centred on a charismatic young widow, Cecilia, where prevails an atmosphere of peace and love, gradually revealing itself as a new religion with liturgy and rituals that appeal aesthetically and emotionally to Marius. The sense of purposeful community there, set against the persecution of Christians by the authorities and the competing philosophical systems in Rome, contributes to Marius' mood of isolation and emotional failure. Overshadowed by thoughts of mortality he revisits home and pays his respects to the family dead, burying their funerary urns, and sets out again for Rome in Cornelius's company. On the way the two are arrested as part of a sweep of suspected Christians. It emerges that only one of the young men is of this sect, and Marius, unbeknown to Cornelius, makes their captors believe it is he. Cornelius is set free, deceived into thinking that Marius will follow shortly. The latter endures hardship and exhaustion as he journeys captive towards Rome, falls ill, and dying is abandoned by his captors. "Had there been one to listen just then," Pater comments, "there would have come, from the very depth of his desolation, an eloquent utterance at last, on the irony of men's fates, on the singular accidents of life and death."

Marius is tended in his last days by some poor country people, secret believers who take him to be one of their own. Though he has shown little interest in the doctrines of the new faith and dies more or less in ignorance of them, he is nevertheless, Pater implies, "a soul naturally Christian" (anima naturaliter christiana) and he finds peace in his final hours as he reviews his life: "He would try to fix his mind on all the persons he had loved in life, dead or living, grateful for his love or not. In the bare sense of having loved he seemed to find that on which his soul might 'assuredly rest and depend'. ... And again, as of old, the sense of gratitude seemed to bring with it the sense also of a living person at his side" (end of 'Part the Fourth').

== Themes ==
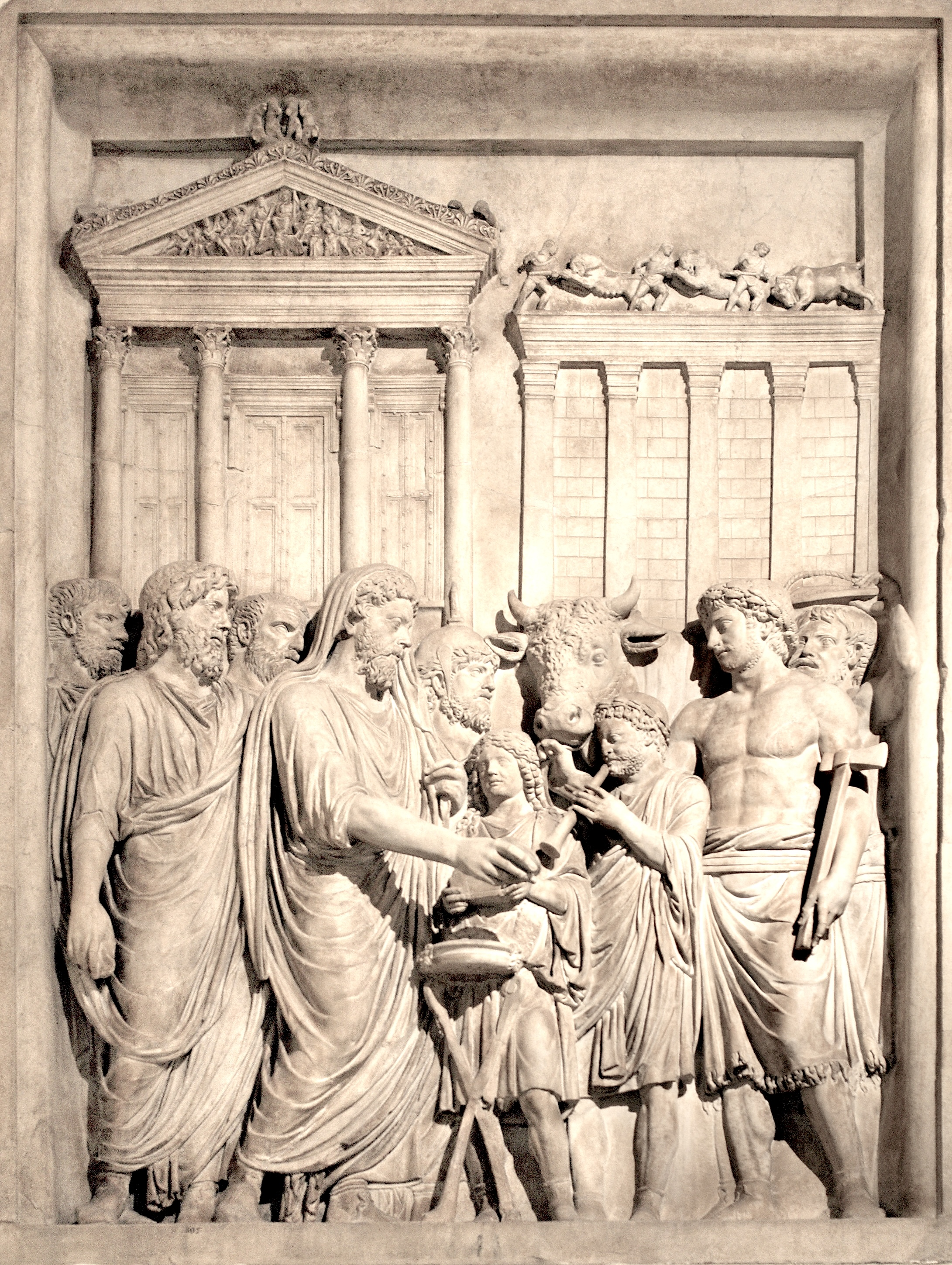
Marcus Aurelius and members of the Imperial family offer sacrifice at the Temple of Jupiter Capitolinus, in gratitude for success against Germanic tribes - an episode described in Marius

Marius the Epicurean explores a theme central to Pater's thinking and already examined in his earlier Imaginary Portrait 'The Child in the House' (1878): the importance to the adult personality of formative childhood experiences. In addition, conscious of his growing influence and aware that the ‘Conclusion’ to his Studies in the History of the Renaissance (1873) had been misconstrued as amoral, Pater set about clarifying his published ideas. As he states in the third edition of The Renaissance (1888), Marius the Epicurean "deal[s] more fully with thoughts suggested by" the 'Conclusion'. In particular Pater is careful in the novel to distinguish between 'hedonism', as usually understood, and Marius's cerebral, ascetic version of Epicureanism:

"How little I myself really need" (runs Marius' diary), "when people leave me alone, with the intellectual powers at work serenely. The drops of falling water, a few wild flowers with their priceless fragrance, a few tufts even of half-dead leaves, changing colour in the quiet of a room that has but light and shadow in it ..."

Marius' quest exemplifies Pater's dictum that we should "be for ever testing new opinions, never acquiescing in a facile orthodoxy":

"Liberty of soul, freedom from all partial doctrine which does but relieve one element of our experience at the cost of another, freedom from all embarrassment alike of regret for the past and calculation for the future: this would be but the preliminary to the real business of education – insight, insight through culture into all that the present moment holds in trust for us, as we stand so briefly in its presence."

Thus the novel elaborates Pater's ideal of the aesthetic life – a life based on αἴσθησις, sensation, perception – and his theory of the stimulating effect of the pursuit of sensation and insight as an ideal in itself.

Centrally, Marius dedicates much time, and Pater much space, to examining the Meditations and character of Marcus Aurelius, who was warmly admired in the 19th century (by Niebuhr, Matthew Arnold, Renan, George Long and many others) as a paragon of intellectual and moral virtue, but whose Stoicism Marius ultimately finds too bleak and lacking in compassion.

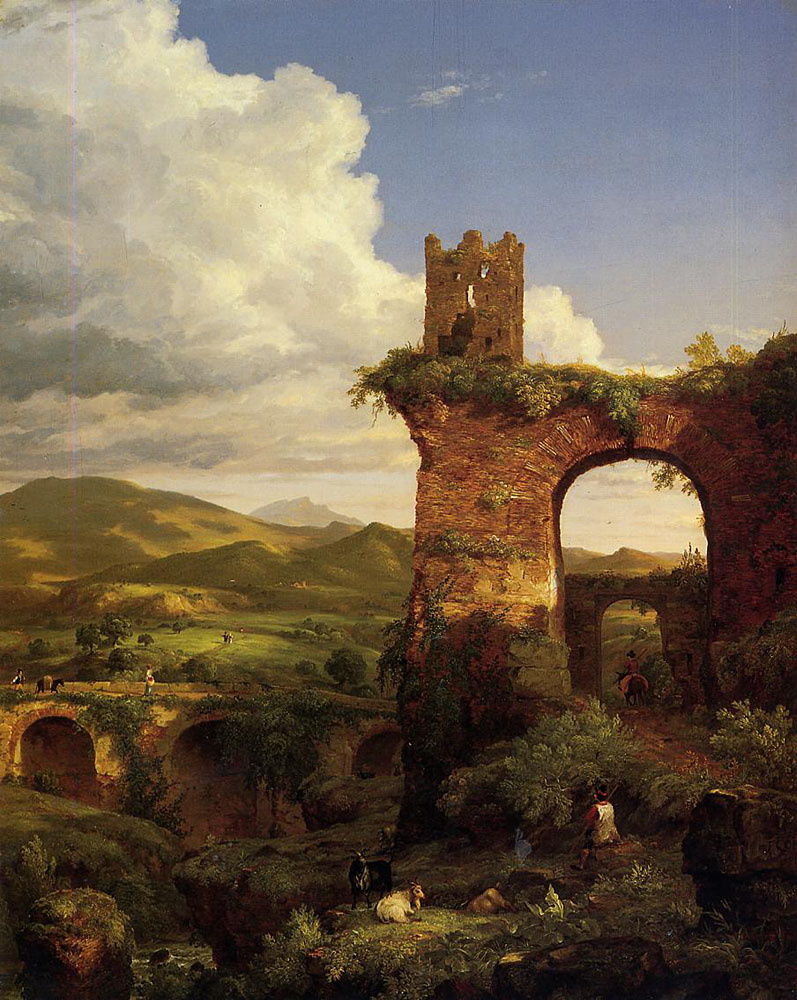
The Sabine Hills, scene of Marius's epiphany (painting by Thomas Cole, 1846)

The appeal of religion – whether ancestral paganism or primitive Christianity – is another major theme of the novel. Indeed the novel's opening and closing episodes betray Pater's continuing nostalgia for the atmosphere, ritual and community of the religious faith he himself had lost. Michael Levey, a biographer and editor of Pater, writes: "Pater is able to depict an early, pure Christianity, not yet sectarian, authoritarian, or established, which offers Marius a vision which is ideal because untarnished." Early Christianity, Pater notes, "had adopted many of the graces of pagan feeling and pagan custom ... So much of what Marius had valued most in the old world seemed to be under renewal and further promotion". Marius, however, having outgrown his childhood piety, dies before he has engaged intellectually with the doctrines of the new faith. He remains essentially Epicurean:

"For still, in a shadowy world, his deeper wisdom had ever been, with a sense of economy, with a jealous estimate of gain and loss, to use life, not as the means to some problematic end, but, as far as might be, from dying hour to dying hour, an end in itself – a kind of music, all-sufficing to the duly trained ear, even as it died out on the air."

His epiphany in the Sabine Hills, where he sensed a "divine companion" and the existence of a Platonic "Eternal Reason" or Cosmic Mind, is not a prelude to religious faith, though it continues to comfort him. Some readers take the novel at face value, as a conversion narrative; others may feel that Pater makes it hard for them to believe that Marius, with his acute, probing, restless mind, would have embraced Christian doctrines if he had examined them. Instead the novel remains open-ended, leaving us with a provisional ideal of 'aesthetic humanism' while bringing Marius, intuitively if not intellectually, to a Christian end.

== Publishing history ==
Marius was favourably reviewed and sold well; a second edition with minor revisions came out in the same year (November 1885). For the third edition (1892) Pater made extensive stylistic revisions, this version being reprinted regularly until the early 1930s. An edition with introduction and notes by Anne Kimball Tuell was published by Macmillan, Pater's original publishers, in New York in 1929. Two further scholarly editions were published in the mid-1980s to mark the novel's centenary (see Editions below).

== Critical reception ==
In an early review in Macmillan's Magazine the novelist Mary Ward praised "the great psychological interest" of the book, but identified as a weakness its tendency to depict Christianity from an aesthetic viewpoint, rather than presenting it as life's ultimate truth and reality. T. S. Eliot, with his Stoic and Christian sympathies, concurred in his influential 1930 essay.

More recently William F. Shuter has noted that "the lack of curiosity exhibited by Marius as to what was actually believed by the Christian community to which he is so strongly drawn" matched Pater's own lack of curiosity; it contrasts strongly with Marius' (and Pater's) keen interest in philosophy.

Harold Bloom writes, "Pater evaded the novel's ultimate problem by killing off Marius before the young man grasps the theological and moral exclusiveness of Christianity. Marius could not remain Marius and renounce [Epicureanism]. Whether Pater earns the structural irony of the novel's concluding pages, as a still-pagan Marius dies a sanctified Christian death, is legitimately questionable." Nevertheless Bloom praises Pater's integrity in his handling of Marius's epiphany in the Sabine Hills: "The self knows that it is joined to no immortal soul, yet now believes also that its own integrity can be at one with the system of forces outside it. By de-idealising the epiphany, Pater makes it available to the coming age."

== Literary significance ==
As well as being of interest to students of Pater's ideas and personality (Marius's diary in Chapter XXV has a Montaigne-like candour unusual for Pater) Marius the Epicurean is of interest as "one of the more remarkable fictional experiments of the late nineteenth century". Pater's interspersing of narrative with classical and historical texts – borrowings acknowledged and unacknowledged, translations and adaptations – makes Marius the Epicurean an early example of a novel enriched by intertextuality. These fragments cover a range of discourses – narrative within narrative (from Apuleius), oration (by Fronto), formal dialogue (an abridgement of Lucian's Hermotimus), letters (Eusebius) – which, taken with other metafictional devices – the comparative lack of plot, action, characterisation, time-line and dialogue – make the novel "look forward beyond its century to modern works of fiction".

== Trilogy ==
Pater conceived Marius as the first of "a trilogy of works of similar character, dealing with the same problems under altered historical conditions". He began work on the second novel, Gaston de Latour, set in turbulent late 16th-century France, shortly after finishing Marius, but it remained unfinished at his death. In 1896, Pater's friend and literary executor, Charles Lancelot Shadwell, edited and published seven chapters of Gaston.

In 1995, Gerald Monsman published Gaston de Latour: The Revised Text, re-editing the seven chapters and editing the remaining six which Shadwell had withheld as too unfinished. "Through the imaginary portrait of Gaston and Gaston's historical contemporaries – Ronsard, Montaigne, Bruno, Queen Marguerite, King Henry III – Pater's fantasia confronts and admonishes the Yellow Nineties, Oscar Wilde not least."

In an 1891 review of The Picture of Dorian Gray in The Bookman, Pater had disapproved of Wilde's distortion of Epicureanism: "A true Epicureanism aims at a complete though harmonious development of man's entire organism. To lose the moral sense therefore, for instance the sense of sin and righteousness, as Mr. Wilde's heroes are bent on doing so speedily, as completely as they can, is ... to become less complex, to pass from a higher to a lower degree of development." Though unfinished, Gaston throws light on Pater's intentions in Marius, as well as further developing his experimental technique: "Dramatic action is filtered by memory, ideas, and multiple perspectives," writes Monsman, "dissolved so radically that the fictional protagonist seems almost to be reading about the age in which he lived."

The third novel in the trilogy was to have been set in England in the late 18th century.

== Editions ==
- Walter Pater, Marius the Epicurean, ed. Michael Levey (Penguin Classics, Harmondsworth, 1985); with introduction and notes.
- Walter Pater, Marius the Epicurean, ed. Ian Small (World's Classics, Oxford, 1986); a facsimile text of the 1934 Everyman's Library edition, with new introduction and notes.

== In literature ==
- In Maugham's Of Human Bondage (1915) a character asks "Don't you remember the chapter in Marius where Pater talks of the gentle exercise of walking as the best incentive to conversation?" (Chapter 26)
