= Philip Graham (writer) =

American author, professor, and editor (born 1951)

- Born: August 26, 1951 (age 75); Brooklyn, NY, United States
- Occupation: Novelist

Philip Graham (born August 26, 1951) is an American author, professor, and editor. He is one of the founders, and is the editor-at-large, of the journal Ninth Letter, as well as a professor emeritus in the Creative Writing Program at the University of Illinois Urbana-Champaign where he received three campus-wide teaching awards. He also taught in the low-residency MFA program of the Vermont College of Fine Arts. Additionally, he is the recipient of a National Endowment for the Arts Creative Writing Fellowship, a grant from the National Endowment for the Humanities, two Illinois Arts Council grants, and the William Peden Prize in Fiction from The Missouri Review, as well as fellowship residencies at the MacDowell Colony and Yaddo artists' colony.

Graham was born in Brooklyn, New York City, on August 26, 1951. He received a B.A. from Sarah Lawrence College in 1973, where he studied with Grace Paley, and received an M.A. from City College of the City University of New York in 1976, where he studied with Donald Barthelme and Frederic Tuten.

== Writing ==
Prose poems from his first book, The Vanishings (Release Press, 1978), first appeared in The Paris Review, Virginia Quarterly Review, PoetryNow, and elsewhere. It was listed by Library Journal as one of the best small press publications of 1978.

Short stories from The Art of the Knock (William Morrow and Company, 1985) first appeared in The New Yorker, The Washington Post Magazine, Carolina Quarterly, and Chicago Review, and subsequently appeared in the anthologies The Norton Book of Ghost Stories (edited by Brad Leithauser) and Contemporary American Short Stories (edited by Hans-Heindrich Rudnick). The Art of the Knock was listed as one of the best new works of fiction of 1985 by the San Francisco Chronicle. It was reissued by Dzanc Books in 2014.

Excerpts from the memoir Parallel Worlds: An Anthropologist and a Writer Encounter Africa, co-authored with Alma Gottlieb (Crown Publishing Group/Random House, 1993) originally appeared in Poets & Writers Magazine, Writer’s Digest, and The Cream City Review. It was the winner of the 1993 Victor Turner Prize in Ethnographic Writing.

The novel How to Read an Unwritten Language (Scribner, 1995) was nominated for the 1997 International Dublin Literary Award, and listed by the 1996 Magill’s Literary Annual as one of the outstanding books of 1995. The novel also appeared on the WordStock bestseller list. The paperback edition (Warner Books, 1996) was listed as a new noteworthy paperback by The New York Times Book Review. It was reissued by Dzanc Books in 2014.

Interior Design: Stories was published by Scribner in 1996 and reissued by Dzanc Books in 2014. Short stories from the collection originally appeared in The Missouri Review, Fiction, North American Review, and Mid-American Review, among others. The short story "Angel" was the winner of the 1992 William Peden Prize in Fiction from The Missouri Review, and was anthologized in The Year’s Best Fantasy and Horror Tenth Annual Collection. The short story "Interior Design" was anthologized in Turning Life into Fiction 2nd edition, edited by Robin Hemley.

The Moon Come to Earth: Dispatches from Lisbon (University of Chicago Press, 2009) is a travel memoir about Graham's year spent living in Lisbon with family. The book collects and expands dispatches that originally appeared on the McSweeney's website.

Braided Worlds is a sequel to Parallel Worlds, co-authored with Alma Gottlieb (University of Chicago Press, 2012). Excerpts from this memoir originally appeared in McSweeney's Internet Tendency; The Moon, Come to Earth: Dispatches from Lisbon; Mid-American Review; Being There: Learning to Live Cross-Culturally (edited by Melvin Konner and Sarah Davis); Anthropology and Humanism; and Bridges to Friendship (edited by Bruce Grindal and Frank Salamone).

Graham's non-fiction has appeared in The New York Times, Chicago Tribune, The Washington Post, and In the Middle of the Middle West: Literary Nonfiction from the Heartland (edited by Becky Bradway). He has written book reviews on contemporary fiction and non-fiction for the Chicago Tribune and The New Leader. His essays on the craft of writing have appeared in Rules of Thumb: 73 Authors Reveal Their Fiction Writing Fixations (edited by Michael Martone and Susan Neville), Words Overflown by Stars (edited by David Jauss), Now Write! Nonfiction Writing Exercises from Today’s Best Writers and Teachers (edited by Sherry Ellis), and The Field Guide to Writing Flash Nonfiction (edited by Dinty W. Moore).
