= Aurelie Sheehan =

American novelist and short story writer

Aurelie Sheehan (June 16, 1963 – August 4, 2023) was an American novelist and short story writer.

== Biography ==
Sheehan was born in Verdun, France, while her parents were stationed there as part of her father's service in the United States Army. Her mother Valerie Harms and father Laurence Francis Sheehan were both published writers. The couple had a second child Alex "Pippa" Sheehan and later relocated to Connecticut, where the two children were raised.

Sheehan graduated from Hampshire College in 1984 and later earned her master's degree from the City University of New York in 1990.

She taught at Sheridan College, the City College of New York, and Johns Hopkins University in Washington, D.C., before joining the faculty of University of Arizona in 2000, where she became a full-time creative writing professor. She served as head of the English department there for over four years until stepping down in December 2022.

Sheehan died at her home in Tucson, Arizona, at the age of 60 after an eight-month illness of brain cancer. She was married to the author Reed Karaim for over 25 years, with whom she had one daughter, Alexandra Karaim.

== Bibliography ==
=== Novels ===
- History Lesson for Girls (Penguin Books, 2004)
- The Anxiety of Everyday Objects (Viking Press, 2006)

=== Short story collections ===
- Jack Kerouac Is Pregnant (Dalkey Archive Press, 1994)
- Jewelry Box: A Collection of Histories (BOA Editions, Ltd., 2013)
- Demigods on Speedway (University of Arizona Press, 2014)
- Once into the Night (FC2, 2019), winner of FC2's Catherine Doctorow Innovative Fiction Prize
