= Jourdain =

Jourdain is a surname.

== People ==
People with the surname Jourdain:

- Alice von Hildebrand (née Jourdain), Belgian-American philosopher, theologian and college professor
- Amable Jourdain (1788–1818), French historian and orientalist
- Anselme Jourdain (1731–1816), French dentist and surgeon
- Bernard Jourdain (born 1950), Mexican race car driver
- Charles Jourdain (born 1995), Canadian mixed martial artist
- Eleanor Jourdain (1863–1924), English academic and author
- Étienne Jourdain (1900–?), French wrestler
- Francis Charles Robert Jourdain (1865–1940), British ornithologist and oologist
- Francis Jourdain (1876–1958), French decorative artist and political activist
- Frantz Jourdain (1847–1935), Belgian architect and author
- Geneviève Jourdain (1945-2006), engineer, professor and researcher, worked on development of signal processing
- John Jourdain (?–1619), English navigator and businessman
- Jonathan Genest-Jourdain (born 1979), Canadian politician
- Luc Brodeur-Jourdain (born 1983), Canadian football player
- Margaret Jourdain (1876–1951), English furniture writer
- Marie-Claude Jourdain, better known as Lova Moor (born 1946), French dancer and singer
- Michel Jourdain
  - Michel Jourdain Sr. (born 1947), Mexican race car driver
  - Michel Jourdain Jr. (born 1976), Mexican race car driver
- Patrick Jourdain (1942–2016), British bridge player, teacher and journalist
- Paul Jourdain (1878–1948), French industrialist and politician
- Philip Jourdain (1879–1919), English logician
- Roger Jourdain (1912–2002), Ojibwe civic leader
- Silvester Jourdain (d. 1650), English adventurer
- Yonel Jourdain (born 1971), American footballer

== Fictional characters ==
- Jourdain de Blaye, title character of a chanson de geste
- Julien Jourdain, DC Comics character also known as Circuit Breaker
- Monsieur Jourdain, main character in Molière's Le Bourgeois gentilhomme

== See also ==
- Jourdain Society, formerly the 'British Oological Association', an organisation for egg-collectors
- Jordan (disambiguation)
- Jordanus (disambiguation)
- Jourdan (disambiguation)
