= Moberly–Jourdain incident =

1911 purported time travel occurrence

Coordinates: 48.8158°N 2.1097°E

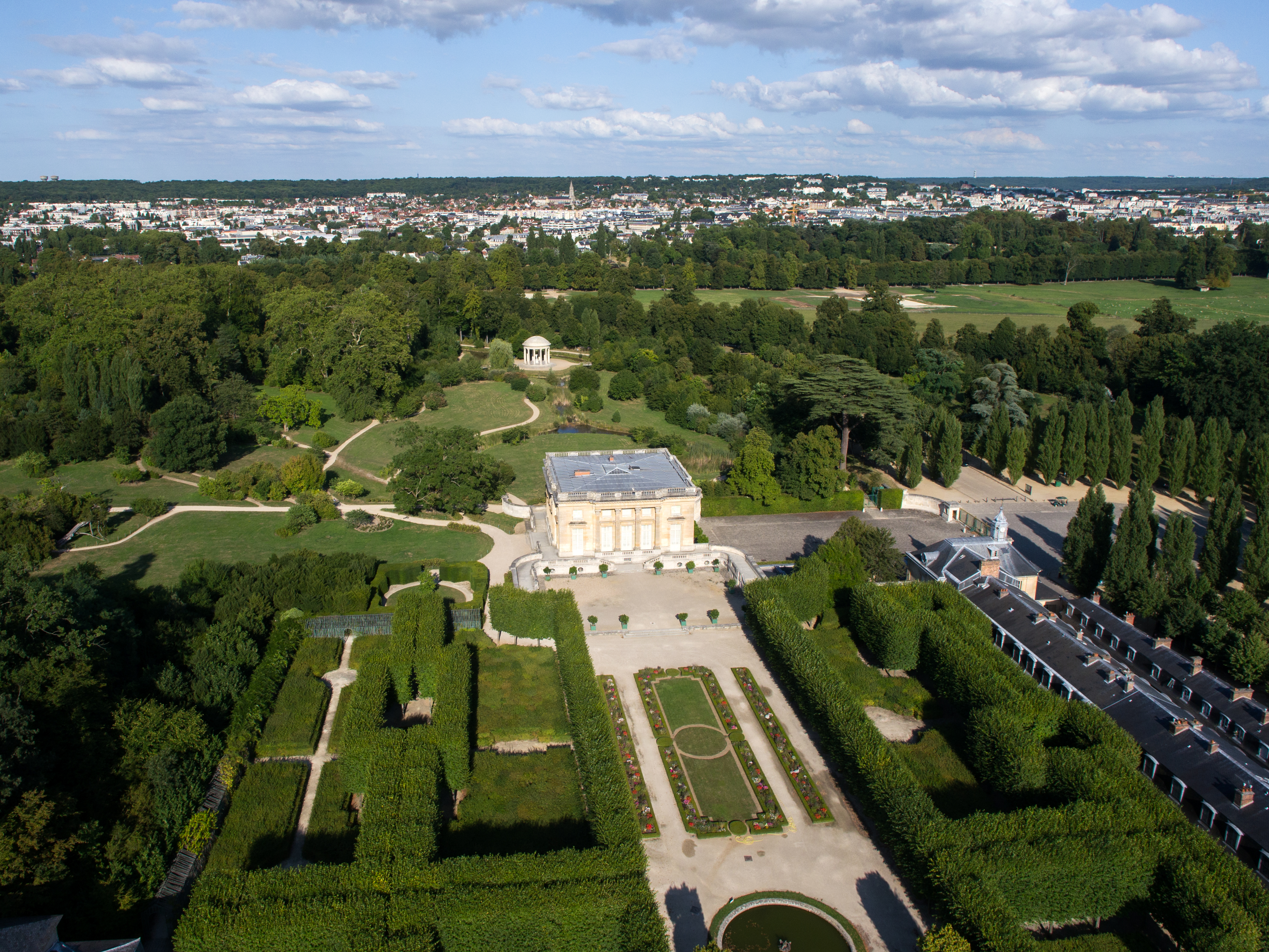
An aerial view of the Petit Trianon, Versailles.

The Moberly–Jourdain incident (also the Ghosts of Petit Trianon or Versailles, French: les fantômes du Trianon / les fantômes de Versailles) is a claim of time travel and hauntings made by Charlotte Anne Moberly (1846–1937) and Eleanor Jourdain (1863–1924).

In 1911, Moberly and Jourdain published a book entitled An Adventure under the names of "Elizabeth Morison" and "Frances Lamont". Their book describes a visit they made to the Petit Trianon, a small château in the grounds of the Palace of Versailles, where they claimed to have seen the gardens as they had been in the late eighteenth century, as well as ghosts, including Marie Antoinette and others. Their story caused a sensation but was not generally considered credible.

== Background ==
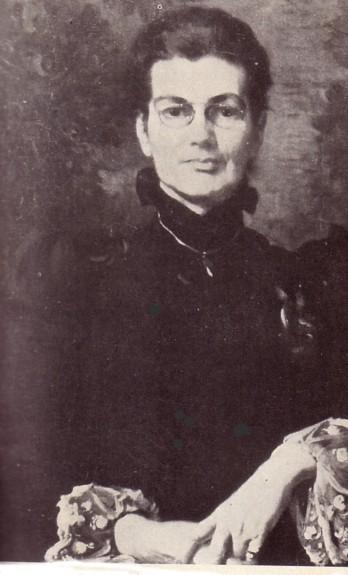
Charlotte Anne Moberly

Charlotte Anne Moberly, born in 1846, was the tenth of fifteen children. She came from a professional background; her father, George Moberly, was the headmaster of Winchester College and later Bishop of Salisbury. In 1886, Moberly became the first principal of a hall of residence for young women, St. Hugh's College in Oxford. It became apparent that Moberly needed someone to help run the college, and Jourdain was asked to become Moberly's assistant.

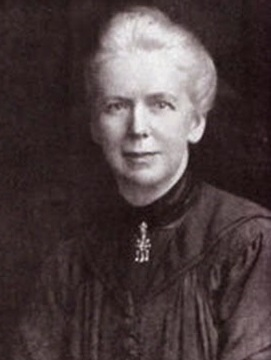
Eleanor Jourdain

Eleanor Jourdain, born in 1863, was the eldest of ten children. Her father, the Reverend Francis Jourdain, was the vicar of Ashbourne in Derbyshire. She was the sister of art historian Margaret Jourdain and mathematician Philip Jourdain. She went to school in Manchester, unlike most girls of the time who were educated at home.

Jourdain was also the author of several textbooks, ran a school of her own, and after the incident became the vice-principal of St. Hugh's College. Before Jourdain was appointed, it was decided that the two women should get to know one another better; Jourdain owned an apartment in Paris where she tutored English children, and so Moberly went to stay with her.

== Claims ==
Moberly and Jourdain recounted that they had decided to visit the Palace of Versailles as part of several trips around Paris, detailing how, on 10 August 1901, they travelled by train to Versailles. They remembered not thinking much of the palace after touring it, so they said they decided to walk through the gardens to the Petit Trianon. Upon reaching the Grand Trianon they found it was closed to the public.

They recollected travelling with a Baedeker guidebook, but said they became lost after missing the turn for the main avenue, Allée des Deux Trianons, and entered a lane, where they bypassed their destination. Moberly reported that she noticed a woman shaking a white cloth out of a window while Jourdain recalled noticing an old deserted farmhouse, outside of which was an old plough.

At this point they described a feeling of oppression and dreariness coming over them after which men who they thought looked like palace gardeners told them to go straight on. Moberly described the men as "very dignified officials, dressed in long greyish green coats with small three-cornered hats". Jourdain recalled that she noticed a cottage with a woman holding out a jug to a girl in the doorway, describing it as a "tableau vivant", a living picture, much like Madame Tussauds waxworks.

Moberly did not observe the cottage, but remembered that she felt the atmosphere change. She wrote: "Everything suddenly looked unnatural, therefore unpleasant; even the trees seemed to become flat and lifeless, like wood worked in tapestry. There were no effects of light and shade, and no wind stirred the trees."

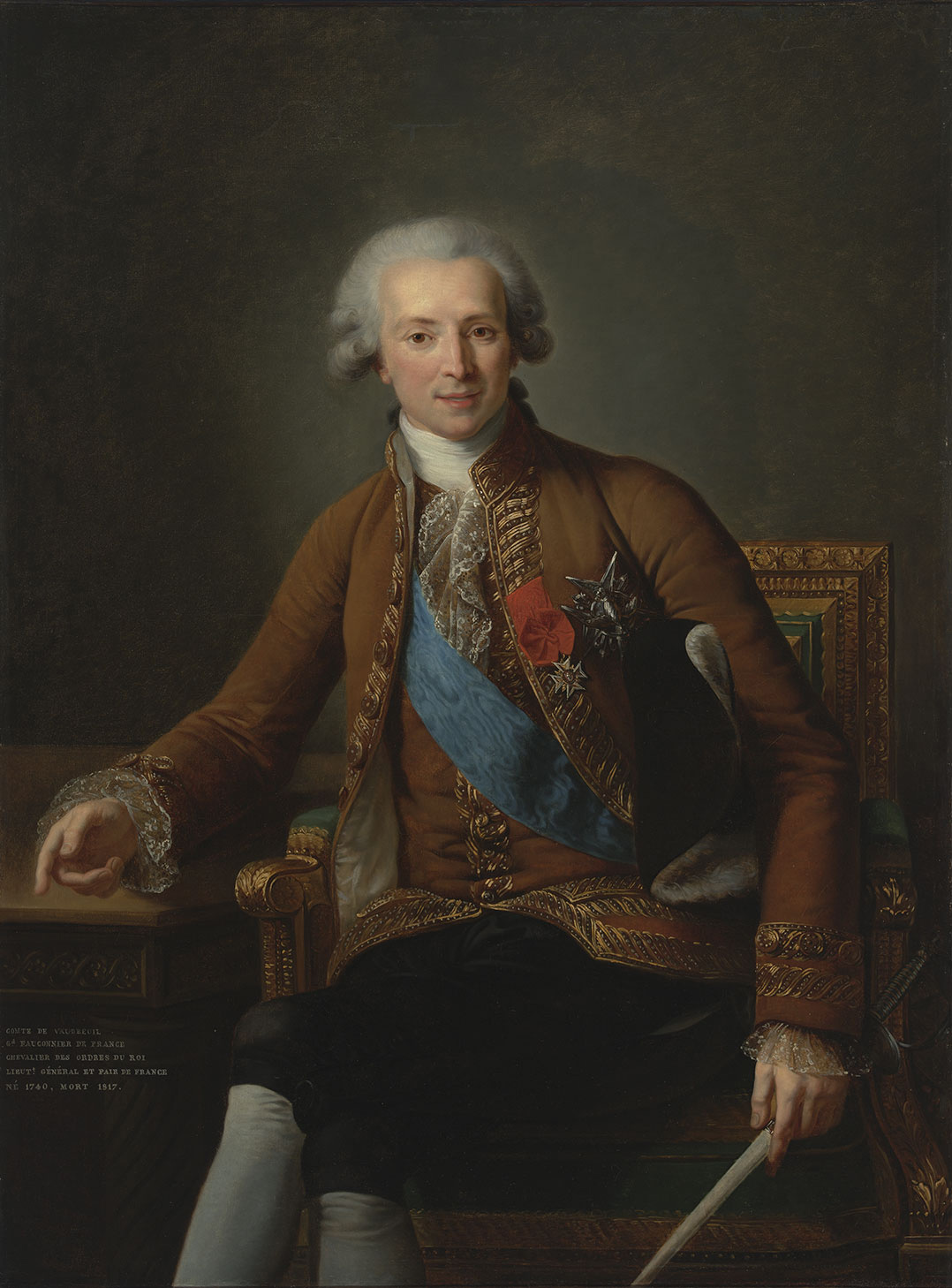
Portrait of the Comte de Vaudreuil by Élisabeth Vigée Le Brun, 1784. The Comte de Vaudreuil was later suggested as a candidate for the man with the marked face allegedly seen by Moberly and Jourdain.

They reported reaching the edge of a wood, close to the Temple de l'Amour, and coming across a man seated beside a garden kiosk, wearing a cloak and large shady hat. According to Moberly, his appearance was "most repulsive ... its expression odious. His complexion was dark and rough." Jourdain noted "The man slowly turned his face, which was marked by smallpox; his complexion was very dark. The expression was evil and yet unseeing, and though I did not feel that he was looking particularly at us, I felt a repugnance to going past him." They said that another man whom they described as "tall ... with large dark eyes, and crisp curling black hair under a large sombrero hat" came up to them, and showed them the way to the Petit Trianon.

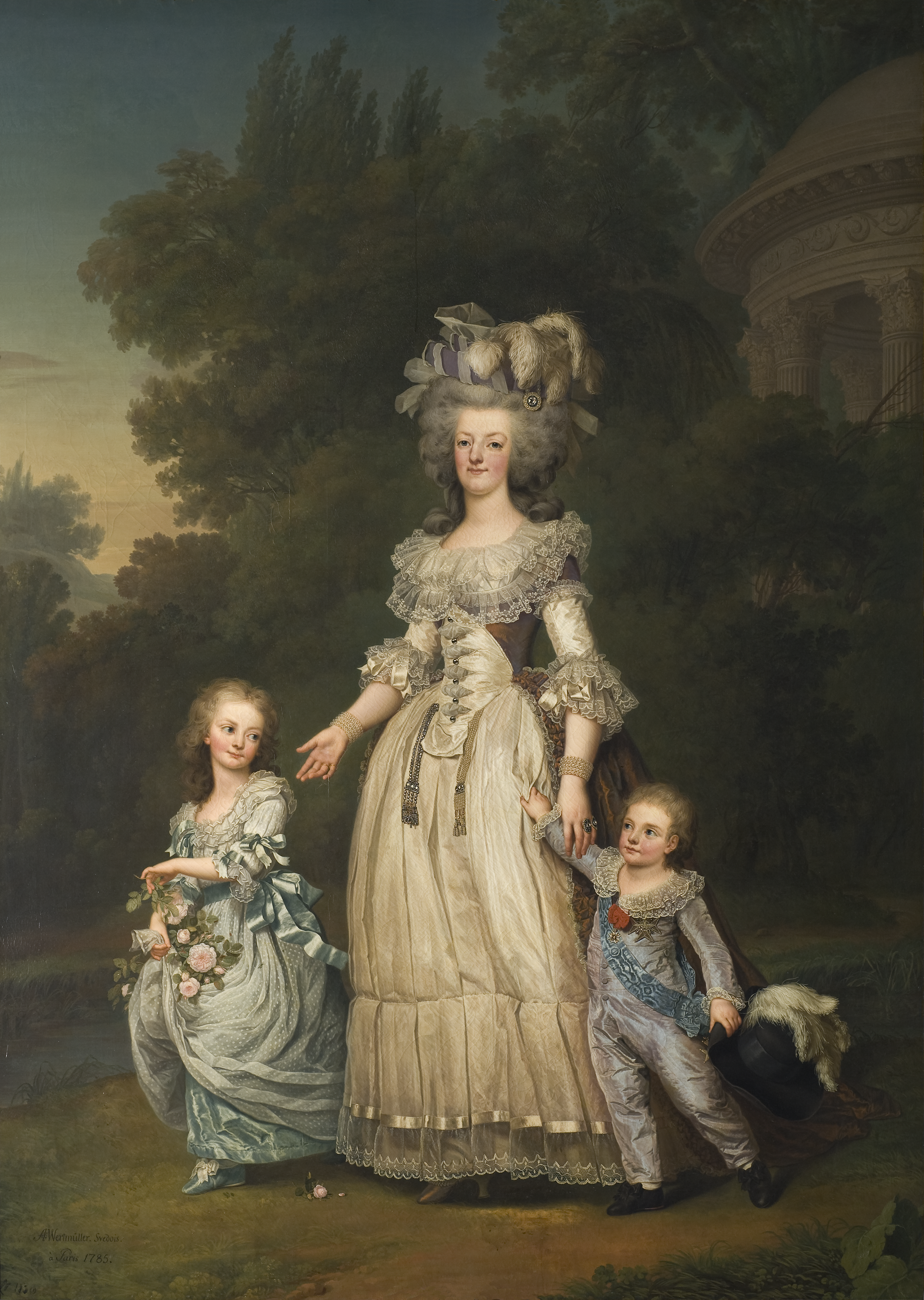
A portrait of Marie Antoinette by Wertmüller. The figure that Moberly saw near the Petit Trianon was claimed to bear a resemblance to the Queen as depicted in this painting

Moberly said she noticed a lady sketching on the grass who looked at them after they crossed a bridge to reach the gardens in front of the palace. She later described the lady as wearing a light summer dress and a shady white hat with much fair hair. Moberly reported that she thought she was a tourist at first, but the dress appeared to be old-fashioned. Moberly came to believe that the lady was Marie Antoinette. Jourdain, however, did not see the lady.

At their return to the palace, they reported that they were directed round to the entrance and joined a party of other visitors. They said that after they toured the house, they had tea at the Hotel des Reservoirs before returning to Jourdain's apartment.

== Aftermath ==
According to Jourdain and Moberly, neither woman mentioned the incident to one another until a week after leaving Versailles when Moberly, in a letter to her sister about their trip, started writing about the afternoon of the Versailles incident. She reportedly asked Jourdain if she thought the Petit Trianon was haunted, and Jourdain told her that she thought it was. Three months later in Oxford, the pair said they compared their notes and decided to write separate accounts of what happened while also researching the history of the Trianon. They thought they might have seen events that took place on 10 August 1792, only six weeks before the abolition of the French monarchy, when the Tuileries palace in Paris was besieged and the king's Swiss guards were massacred.

According to their narrative, they visited the Trianon gardens again on several occasions, but were unable to trace the path they took. Various landmarks, such as the kiosk and the bridge, were missing, and the grounds were full of people. Trying to come up with an explanation, they wondered if they had stumbled across a private party or an event booked that day. However, they found that nothing had been booked that afternoon. Through their research, they thought they recognised the man they reportedly saw by the kiosk as the Comte de Vaudreuil, a friend of Marie Antoinette, who herself Moberly had claimed to see.

Convinced that the grounds were haunted, they decided to publish their story in a book An Adventure (1911) under the pseudonyms of Elizabeth Morison and Frances Lamont. The book, containing the claim that Marie Antoinette had been encountered in 1901, caused a sensation. However, many critics did not take it seriously on the grounds of the implausibilities and inconsistencies that it contained. A review of the book by Eleanor Mildred Sidgwick in the Proceedings of the Society for Psychical Research suggested that the women had misinterpreted normal events that they had experienced. (Note: The review is reprinted in Iremonger 1975, pp. 146–55.) In 1903, an old map of the Trianon gardens was found and showed a bridge that the two women had claimed to have crossed that had not been on any other map. The identity of the authors of An Adventure was not made public until 1931.

Both women claimed many paranormal experiences before and after their adventure. In one of them, Moberly claimed to have seen in the Louvre in 1914 an apparition of the Roman emperor Constantine, a man of unusual height wearing a gold crown and a toga; he was not observed by anybody else. During the First World War, Jourdain, the dominant personality of the pair who had succeeded as Principal of St. Hugh's, became convinced that a German spy was hiding in the college. After developing increasingly autocratic behaviour, she died suddenly in 1924 in the middle of an academic scandal over her leadership of the college, her conduct having provoked mass resignations of academic staff. Moberly died in 1937.

The story of the adventure was made into a television film, the Anglia Television Production, Miss Morison's Ghosts, written and produced by Ian Curteis and directed by John Bruce, in 1981, with Dame Wendy Hiller as Moberly/Morison and Hannah Gordon as Jourdain/Lamont. The BBC broadcast a 90-minute radio dramatisation in 2004 and 2015.

== Explanations and critiques ==
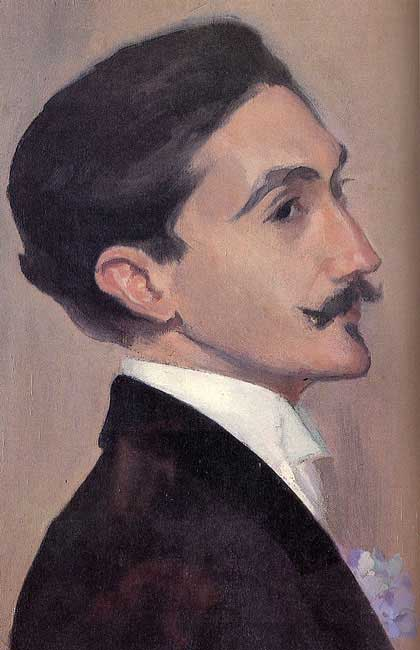
Robert de Montesquiou

A non-supernatural explanation of the events was proposed by Philippe Jullian in his 1965 biography of the aristocratic decadent French poet Robert de Montesquiou. At the time of Moberly and Jourdain's excursion to Versailles, Montesquiou lived nearby and reportedly gave parties in the grounds where his friends dressed in period costume and performed tableaux vivants as part of the party entertainments. Moberly and Jourdain may have inadvertently gatecrashed a gay fancy dress party that they confused for a haunting.

The Marie-Antoinette figure could have been a society lady or a cross-dresser, the pockmarked man Montesquiou himself. It was suggested that a gathering of the French decadent avant-garde of the time could have made a sinister impression on the two middle-class Edwardian spinsters who would have been little used to such company.

In a review of the history of the Moberly-Jourdain adventure and the extensive public reaction to it, Terry Castle noted with skepticism the claim that a shared delusion may have arisen out of a lesbian folie à deux between the two women. Castle concludes that, when all proposed explanations have been considered, a core of mystery remains as much in relation to the psychological dynamics of the pair as to any aspects of the paranormal associated with their story.

Without fully endorsing the de Montesquiou explanation, Michael Coleman carefully examined the story and, in particular, the two published versions of the ladies' accounts, the earlier-written of which, from November 1901, had only previously been published in the second, small print-run, edition of An Adventure in 1913. Coleman concluded that the more widely available texts, as published in the 1911 and later editions, had been considerably aggrandized well after the events described and after the ladies had begun their investigations, while the original accounts had little or nothing to suggest a supernatural experience. He also questioned the rigour and reliability of the ladies' subsequent research, pointing out that few, if any, of their informants are named and that most of their literary and historical references were taken from unreliable sources.

Psychologist Leonard Zusne suggested that it was a hallucinatory experience embellished over time by the two women finding out more about the history of the Palace.

Brian Dunning of Skeptoid concluded that "Moberly and Jourdain were simply human" and were mistaken. He notes that editions of An Adventure were embellished each time they were published, and inconsistencies in their memories were apparent. For example, in the second edition the pair wrote that Moberly did not mention the sketching woman to Jourdain until three months after their visit to Versailles, and Jourdain did not remember such a thing.

In contrast, Moberly did not remember much of what Jourdain described. "It was only after much discussion, note-sharing, and historical research that Moberly and Jourdain came up with the time period as 1789 and assigned identities to a few of the characters they saw, including Marie Antoinette herself as the lady sketching on the lawn." As Moberly and Jourdain admitted they had been lost on the vast grounds of Versailles, Dunning notes that their descriptions of footbridges and kiosks could fit any number of existing structures.

Dame Joan Evans, who owned the copyright to An Adventure, accepted the Jullian explanation and forbade any further editions. After the work came out of copyright, it was republished in 1988 as The Ghosts of Trianon: The Complete 'An Adventure' by Thoth Publication and again in 2008 by CreateSpace, both times crediting Moberly and Jourdain as the authors.

Historian Roy Strong has noted that although the Moberly-Jourdain story has been debunked it "retained its hold on the public imagination for half a century".

== See also ==
- Time travel claims and urban legends
- Miss Morison's Ghosts, a movie about the incident.
- "The Girl in the Fireplace", a fictional account of time travel from Versailles from the TV series Doctor Who.
