= Miss Morison's Ghosts =

British television series

- Genre: Supernatural drama; Mystery
- Based on: The Moberly–Jourdain incident ("An Adventure", 1911) by Charlotte Anne Moberly and Eleanor Jourdain
- Written by: Ian Curteis
- Directed by: John Bruce
- Starring: Wendy Hiller (as Miss Elizabeth Morison), Hannah Gordon (as Miss Frances Lamont)
- Country of origin: United Kingdom
- Original language: English

Production
- Executive producer: Ian Curteis
- Running time: 1 h 44 min (approx.)
- Production company: Anglia Television

Original release
- Network: ITV
- Release: 23 August 1981

Miss Morison's Ghosts is a 1981 British supernatural television drama broadcast by ITV starring Hannah Gordon and Wendy Hiller. It was made by Anglia Television, produced and written by Ian Curteis and directed by John Bruce. It is loosely based on the experiences of two Oxford academics, Charlotte Anne Moberly and Eleanor Jourdain, who claimed that in 1901, on a day trip to Versailles, they travelled back in time to the 18th century court of Louis XVI of France, in an event known as the Moberly–Jourdain incident. The characters in the drama are named Elizabeth Morison and Frances Lamont, which are the pseudonyms under which they published their account.

The drama was also adapted by Dirk Maggs into an audio drama in 2004, in which Miss Morison was played by Patricia Hodge and Miss Lamont by Juliet Stevenson. In this version, their first names are Charlotte and Eleanor. It was broadcast on the BBC World Service and later repeated on BBC Radio 4 Extra.
