= Robert de Montesquiou =

French aristocrat and writer (1855–1921)

- Comte de Montesquiou-Fézensac
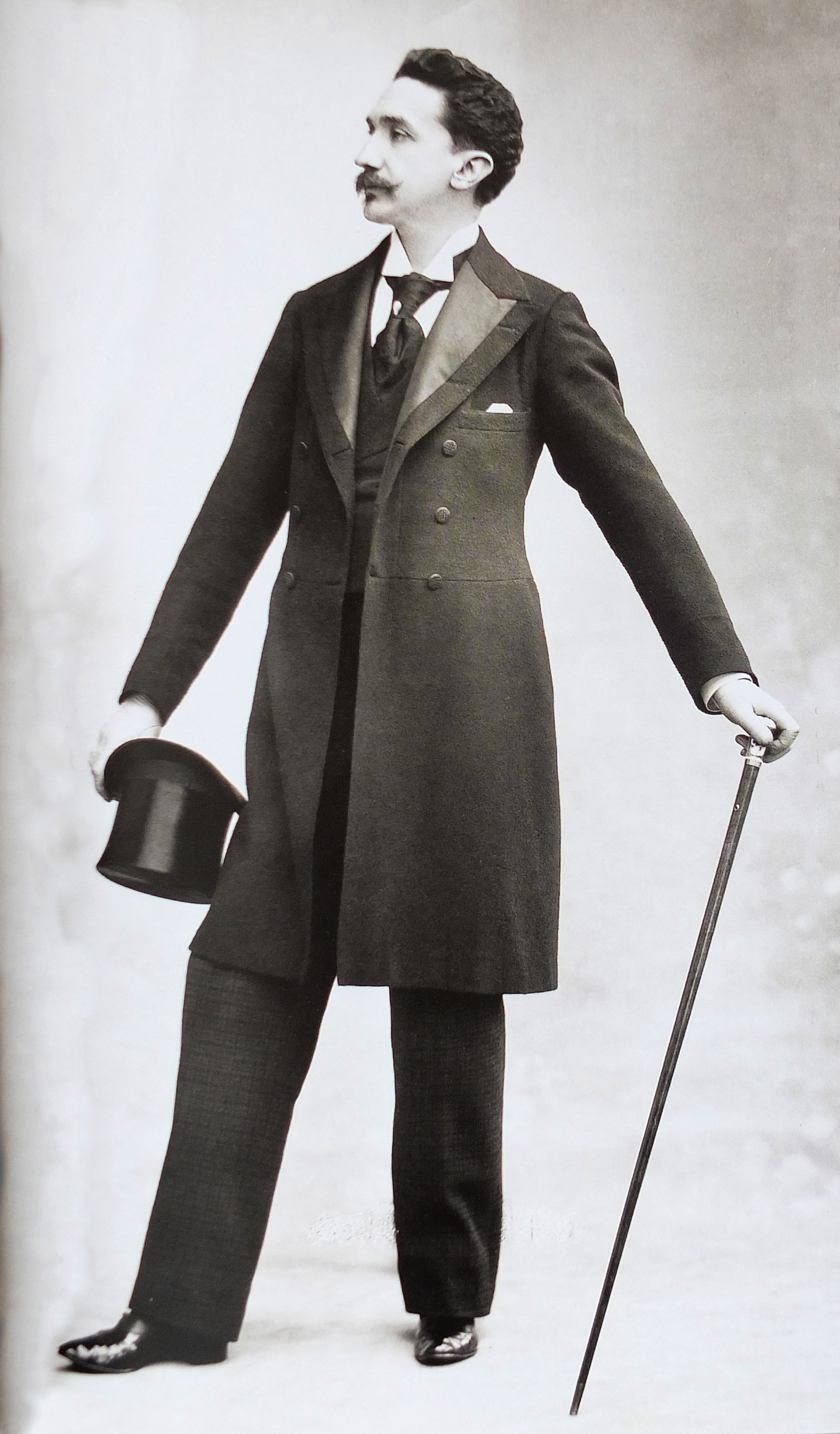
- Photographed by Paul Nadar in 1895
- Born: Marie Joseph Robert Anatole de Montesquiou-Fézensac; 19 March 1855; Paris, France
- Died: 11 December 1921 (aged 66); Menton, France
- Noble family: Montesquiou
- Father: Thierry, Comte de Montesquiou-Fézensac
- Mother: Pauline Duroux
- Occupation: Writer; poet; art collector; socialite

Marie Joseph Robert Anatole, comte de Montesquiou-Fézensac (French: [ʁɔbɛʁ də mɔ̃tɛskju fezɑ̃sak]; 19 March 1855, Paris – 11 December 1921, Menton) was a French aesthete, Symbolist poet, painter, art collector, art interpreter, and dandy. He is reputed to have been the inspiration both for Jean des Esseintes in Joris-Karl Huysmans' À rebours (1884) and, most famously, for the Baron de Charlus in Marcel Proust's À la recherche du temps perdu (1913–1927). In his play Chantecler, Edmond Rostand is said to have caricatured Montesquiou as the Peacock, 'Prince of the unexpected adjective.'" Some believe that he may have been an inspiration for the character Lord Henry in the 1890 novel The Picture of Dorian Gray by Oscar Wilde.

== Family ==
Robert de Montesquiou was a scion of the French Montesquiou-Fézensac family. His paternal grandfather was Count Anatole de Montesquiou-Fézensac (1788–1878), aide-de-camp to Napoleon and grand officer of the Légion d'honneur; his father was Anatole's third son, Thierry, who married Pauline Duroux, an orphan, in 1841. With his wife's dowry, Thierry bought a country house at Charnizay, built a mansion in Paris, and was elected vice-president of the Jockey Club. He was a successful stockbroker who left a substantial fortune. Robert was the last of his parents' children, after brothers Gontran and Aymery, and sister Élise. His cousin, Élisabeth, Countess Greffulhe (1860–1952), was one of Marcel Proust's models for the Duchess of Guermantes in À la recherche du temps perdu.

== Depictions ==
Montesquiou had the ambition to be the most photographed person in the world.

Montesquiou had a strong influence on Émile Gallé (1846–1904), a glass artist with whom he collaborated, and from whom he commissioned major works, and from whom he received hundreds of adulatory letters. He also wrote the verses found in the optional choral parts of Gabriel Fauré's Pavane.

The portrait Arrangement in Black and Gold: Comte Robert de Montesquiou-Fezensac was painted in 1891–92 by Montesquiou's close friend, and model for many of his eccentric mannerisms, James McNeill Whistler. The portrait is in the Frick Collection in Manhattan. The French artist Antonio de La Gandara (1861–1917) produced several portraits of Montesquiou.

Select portraits
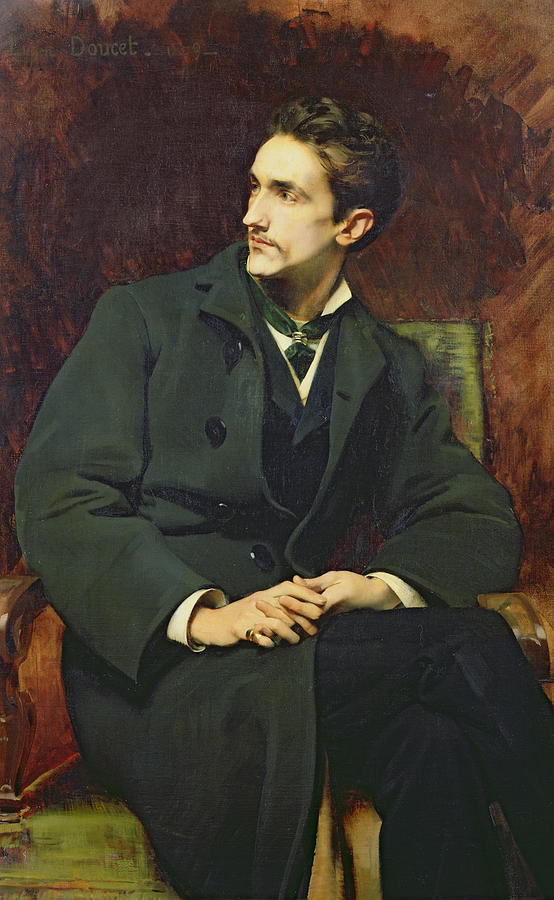
Portrait of Robert, Count of Montesquiou-Fezensac by Henri Lucien Doucet (1879)

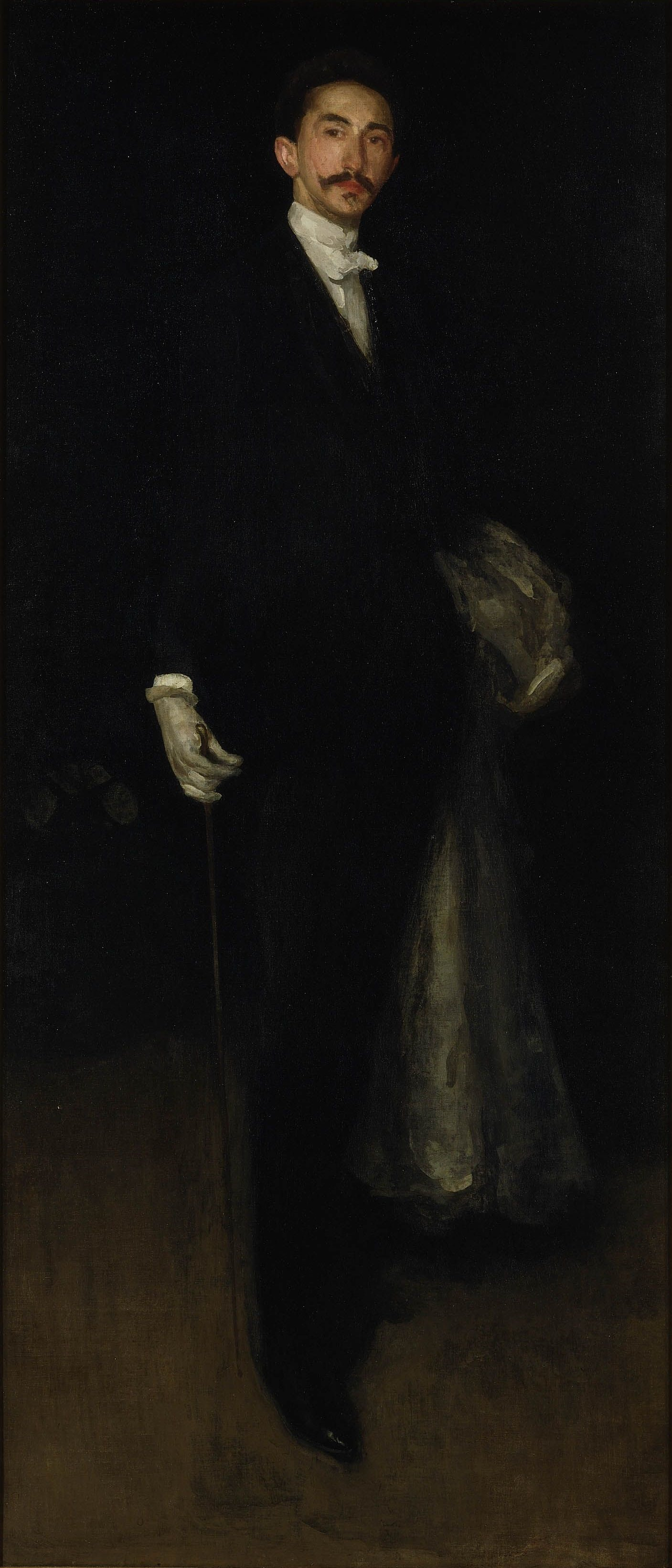
Arrangement in Black and Gold: Comte Robert de Montesquiou-Fezensac by Whistler, 1891–92

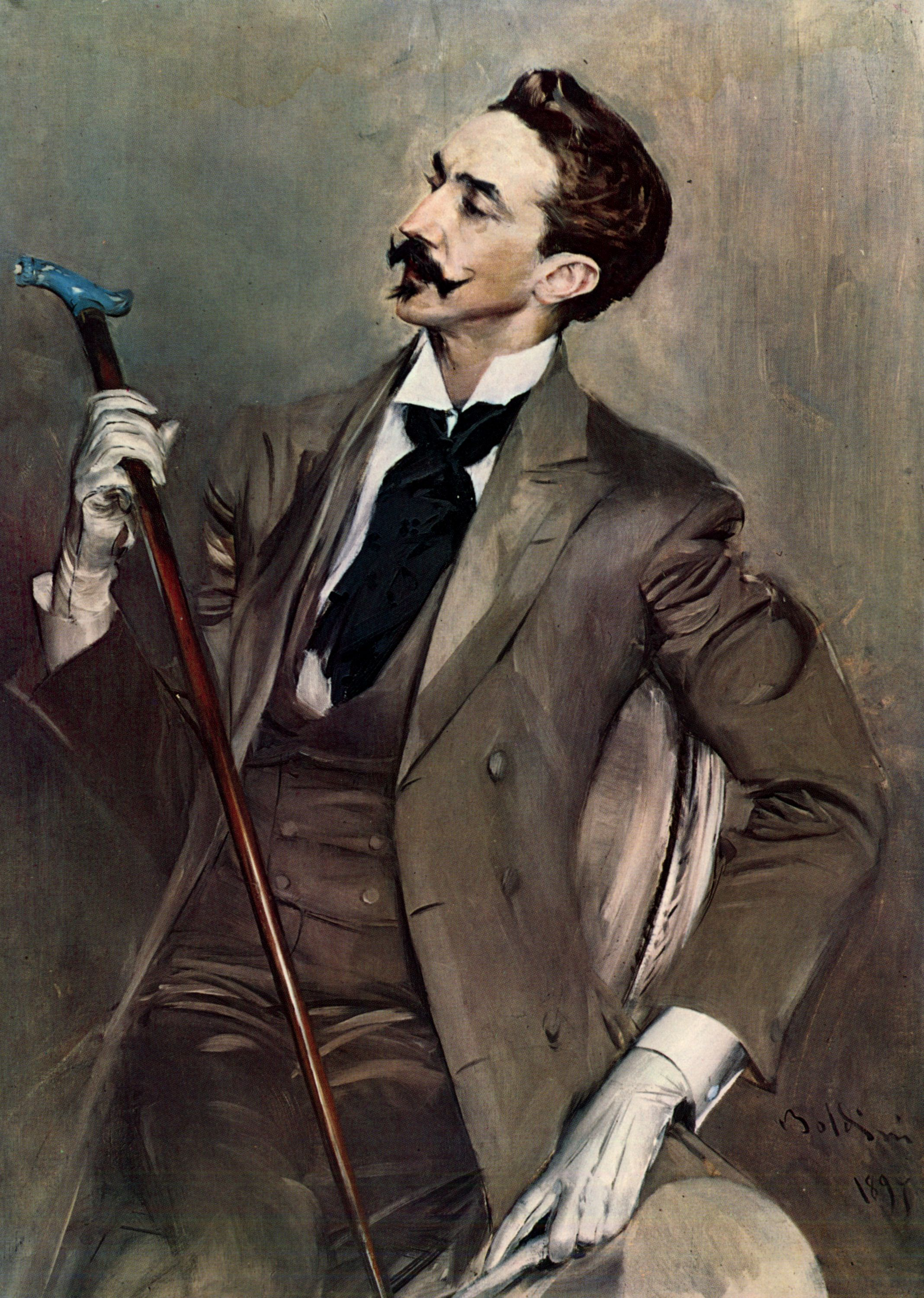
Portrait of the Count Robert de Montesquiou by Giovanni Boldini, 1897

== Persona and sexuality ==
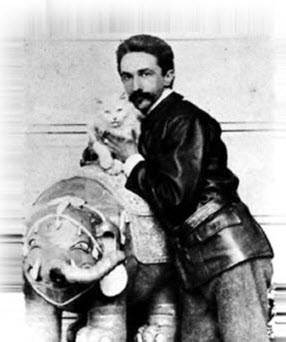
Montesquiou with his Persian cat

One author provides the following written portrait of Montesquiou:

Tall, black-haired, Kaiser-moustached, he cackled and screamed in weird attitudes, giggling in high soprano, hiding his black teeth behind an exquisitely gloved hand—the poseur absolute. Montesquiou's homosexual tendencies were patently obvious, but he may in fact have lived a chaste life. He had no affairs with women, although in 1876 he reportedly once slept with the great actress Sarah Bernhardt, after which he vomited for twenty-four hours. (She remained a great friend.)

=== Sexuality ===
Montesquiou was a "notorious homosexual" and "the most famous dandy" in Paris, who was famed for his lifestyle during the Belle Époque. His flamboyant homosexuality was certainly public knowledge by 1908, when he published a collection of poems and intimate letters dedicated to his deceased partner, Gabriel Yturri, or 1909, when a book on the lives of the homosexual aesthetes of the fin de siècle was published, though he may have been able to hide his sexuality behind the guise of only following the associated aesthetics. Montesquiou was possibly a partial model for the protagonist of Oscar Wilde's The Picture of Dorian Gray, and was a major source for the character Baron de Charlus in good friend Marcel Proust's In Search of Lost Time – particularly its 1921 fourth part, Sodom and Gomorrah – at which point he was effectively outed to the world.

In 1885, he began a close long-term relationship with Gabriel Yturri (March 12, 1860 – July 6, 1905), a South American immigrant from Tucumán, Argentina, who became his secretary, companion, and lover. After Yturri died of diabetes, Henri Pinard replaced him as secretary in 1908 and eventually inherited Montesquiou's much reduced fortune. Montesquiou and Yturri are buried alongside each other at Cimetière des Gonards in Versailles, Île-de-France, France.

=== Society appearances and gatherings ===
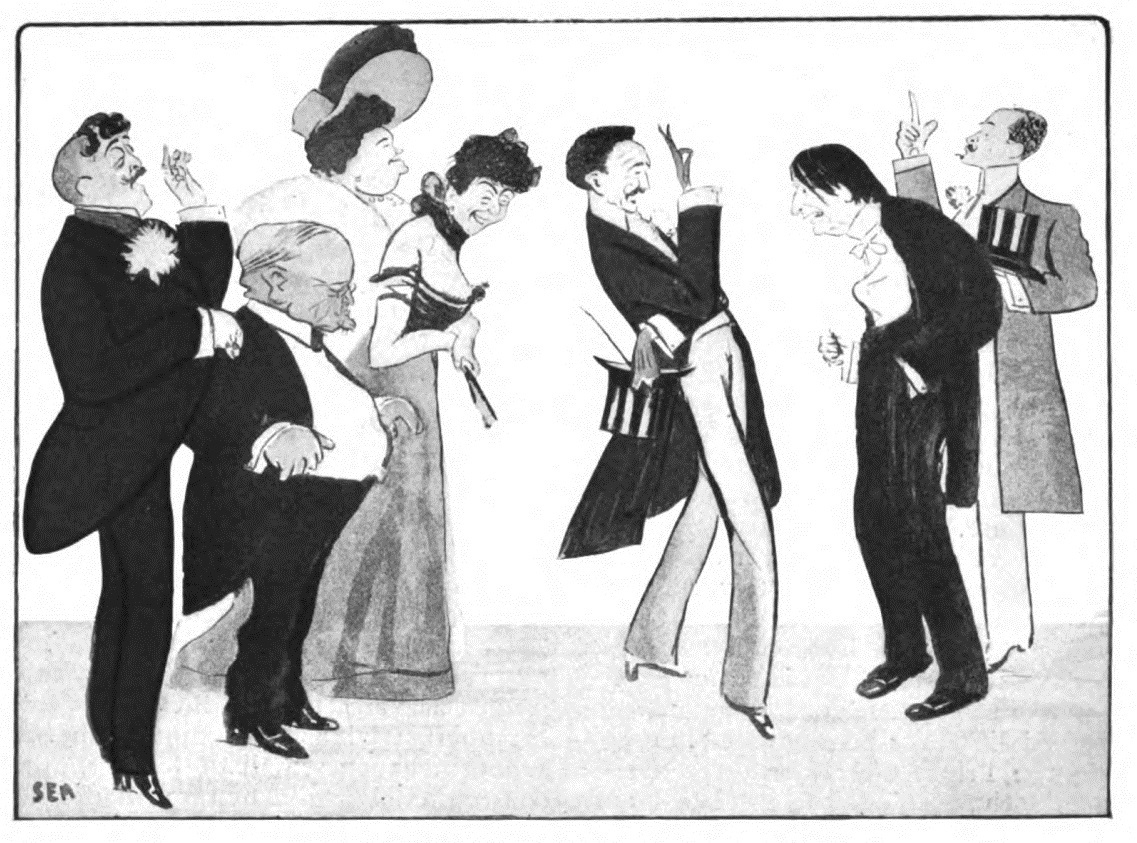
"Sem impressions of a Montesquiou soirée"

Montesquiou had social relationships and collaborations with many celebrities of the fin de siècle period, including Alphonse Daudet (1840–1897), Edmond de Goncourt (1822–1896), Eleonora Duse (1858–1924), Sarah Bernhardt (1844–1923), Gabriele d'Annunzio (1863–1938), Anna de Noailles (1876–1933), Marthe Bibesco (1886–1973), Luisa Casati (1881–1957), Maurice Barrès (1862–1923), Franca Florio (1873-1950), and Samuel Jean Pozzi (1846-1918).

==== An Adventure ====
In his biography, Philippe Jullian proposes that the Moberly–Jourdain incident in 1901, in which Charlotte Anne Moberly and Eleanor Jourdain claimed to experience time travel in the grounds of the Petit Trianon, is explained by their stumbling into a rehearsal of one of Montesquiou's Tableaux Vivants, with his friends (one possibly transvestite) dressed in period costume. Joan Evans, who owned the copyright to An Adventure (1911), Moberly and Jourdain's account of their experiences, accepted this solution and forbade any further editions.

=== Olympics ===
In June 1900, Montesquiou finished third in the hacks and hunter combined event during the International Horse Show in Paris. The event was part of the Exposition Universelle, and later classified as part of the 1900 Summer Olympics.

== Works ==
Montesquiou's poetry has been called untranslatable, and it was poorly received by critics at the time. "[I]n tune with the majority of Montesquiou's critics was the opinion of Paul Morand, who wrote:"

Montesquiou has polished a thousand sonnets with a hand jewelled with black pearls and will leave behind nothing but a few modern-style curiosities and some imitations of Mallarmé written in red ink and sprinkled with gold dust. A personality of the most curious, because entirely phony, from a period of dazzling falsifiers and of pious and impious lies. He will survive thanks only to the des Esseintes of Huysmans and the Baron de Charlus of Proust. Montesquiou was right to frequent men of letters.

As for his paintings, he showed them "only to a few individuals, but after his death over a hundred of them were exhibited in 1923 at the Galeries Georges Petit...." "Montesquiou's work has been offered at auction multiple times, with realized prices ranging from 325 USD to 2,520 USD...."

As for his art interpretation (he distinguished art interpreters from art critics), he excelled "perhaps far beyond his accomplishments as a poet.... This art interpreter published books, catalogues, articles, and extensive passages in his memoirs devoted to [numerous] painters, sculptors, and craftsmen...."

=== Poetry ===
- Les Chauves-Souris, Clairs obscurs (Richard, privately published in 1892, commercially published in 1893; illustrated by Madeleine Lemaire, James McNeill Whistler and Antonio de La Gandara).
- Le Chef des odeurs suaves, Floréal extrait (Richard, 1893)
- Le Parcours du rêve au souvenir (Charpentier et Fasquelle, 1895)
- Les Hortensias bleus (Charpentier et Fasquelle, 1896)
- Les Perles rouges : 93 sonnets historiques (Charpentier et Fasquelle, 1899)
- Les Paons (Charpentier et Fasquelle, 1901)
- Prières de tous : Huit dizaines d'un chapelet rythmique (Maison du Livre, 1902)
- Calendrier Robert de Montesquiou pour 1903
- Calendrier Robert de Montesquiou 1904
- Passiflora (L'Abbaye, 1907)
- Les Paroles diaprées, cent dédicaces (Richard, 1910)
- Les Paroles diaprées, nouvelle série de dédicaces (Richard, 1912)
- Les Offrandes blessées : élégies guerrières (Sansot, 1915)
- Nouvelles Offrandes blessées (Maison du Livre, 1915)
- Offrande coloniale (1915)
- Sabliers et lacrymatoires : élégies guerrières et humaines (Sansot, 1917)
- Un moment du pleur éternel : offrandes innommées (Sansot, 1919)
- Les Quarante bergères : Portraits satiriques..., with a frontispiece by Aubrey Beardsley (Librairie de France, 1925)

=== Lyrics ===
- Pavane (Gabriel Fauré, 1888)

=== Essays ===
- Félicité : étude sur la poësie de Marceline Desbordes-Valmore, suivie d'un essai de classification de ses motifs d'inspiration (Lemerre, 1894)
- Roseaux pensants (Charpentier et Fasquelle, 1897)
- Apollon aux lanternes (Albert Lanier, 1898)
- Autels privilégiés (Charpentier et Fasquelle, 1898)
- Alice et Aline, une peinture de Chassériau (Charpentier et Fasquelle, 1898)
- Musée rétrospectif de la classe 90 (parfumerie : matières premières, matériel, procédés et produits, à l'Exposition universelle internationale de 1900, à Paris, Belin Frères, 1900)
- Alfred Stevens (1823–1906) (extrait de la Gazette des Beaux-Arts, 1900)
- Pays des aromates (Floury, 1900)
- L'Inextricable graveur : Rodolphe Bresdin (Richard, 1904)
- Professionnelles beautés (Juven, 1905)
- Altesses sérénissimes (Juven, 1907)
- Assemblée de notables (Juven, 1908)
- Saints d'Israël (Maison du livre, 1910)
- Brelan de dames : essai d'après trois femmes auteurs (Fontemoing et Cie, 1912)
- Têtes d'expression (Émile-Paul Frères, 1912)
- Paul Helleu, peintre et graveur (Floury, 1913)
- Têtes Couronnées (Sansot, 1916)
- Majeurs et mineurs (Sansot, 1917)
- Diptyque de Flandre, Triptyque de France (Sansot, 1921)
- Les Délices de Capharnaüm (Émile-Paul Frères, 1921)
- Élus et Appelés (Émile-Paul Frères, 1921)
- Le Mort remontant (Émile-Paul Frères, 1922)

=== Novels ===
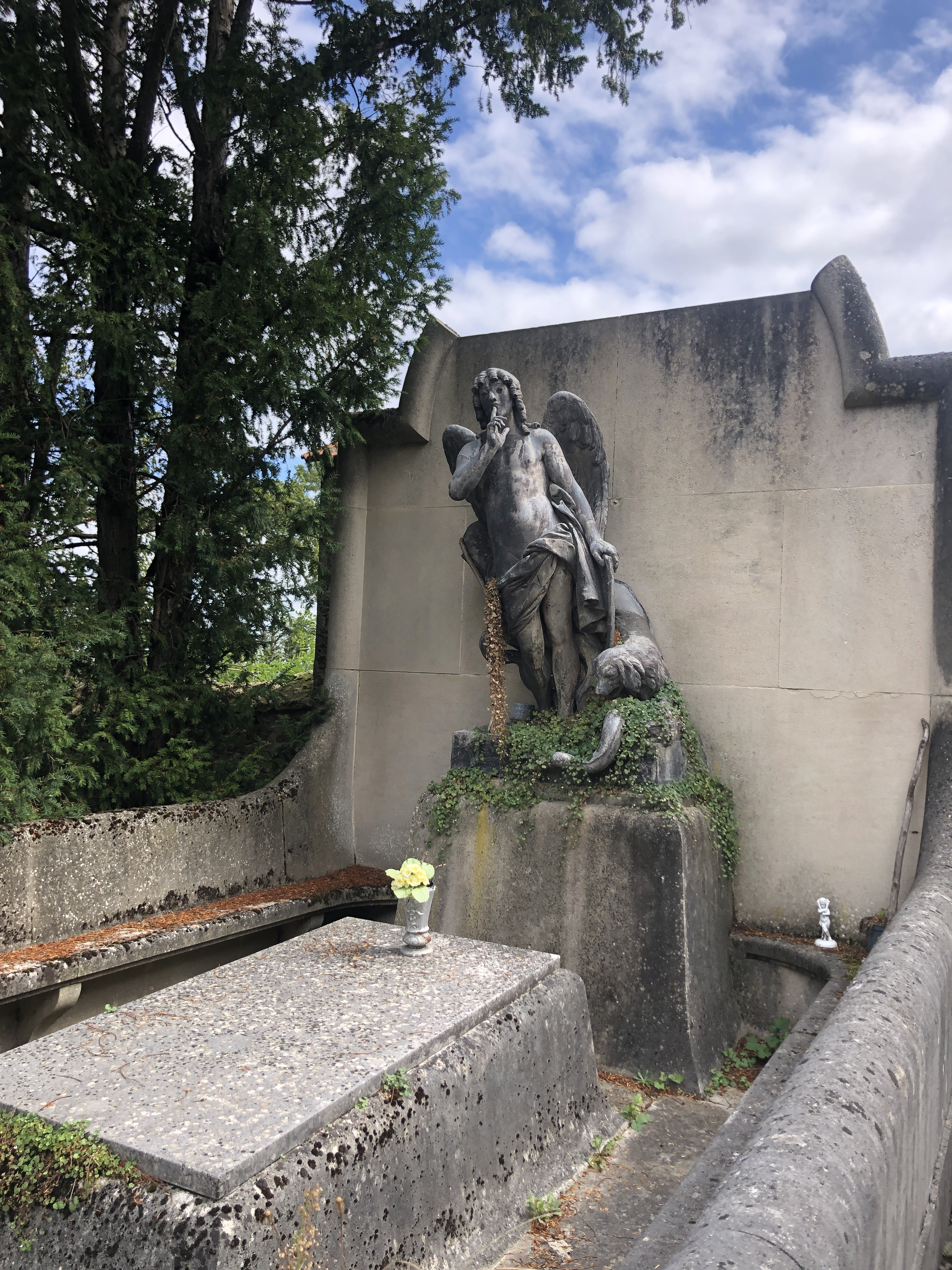
Grave of Montesquiou in cimetière des Gonards.

- La Petite mademoiselle (Albin-Michel, 1911)
- La Trépidation (Émile-Paul Frères, 1922)

=== Biographies ===
- Le Chancelier de fleurs : douze stations d'amitié (Maison du livre, 1907)
- La Divine Comtesse : Étude d'après Madame de Castiglione (Virginia Oldoini) (Goupil, 1913)
- L'Agonie de Paul Verlaine, 1890–1896 (M. Escoffier, 1923)

=== Theatre ===
- Mikhaïl, Mystère en quatre scènes, in verse (after Leo Tolstoy) (1901)

=== Memoirs ===
- Les Pas effacés: mémoires, 3 vol. (Émile-Paul Frères, 1923; republished by Éditions du Sandre, 3 vol., 2007.)
