= Anselme Jourdain =

French dentist and surgeon (1731–1816)

Anselme Louis Bernard Bréchillet-Jourdain (28 November 1731, Paris – 16 January 1816, Paris) was a French dentist and surgeon. The orientalist Amable Jourdain was his son.

== Biography ==
Jourdain was one of the most distinguished Frenchmen in the study and practice of dentistry. He long cooperated in the writing of the medical journal was not a stranger to the Histoire de l'anatomie by Portal.

Jourdain, who had not limited himself exclusively to the study of dentistry, carefully cultivated all parts of medicine, and was not devoid of erudition. He even provided some articles to l'Année littéraire, by Fréron.

== Publications ==
- Nouveaux élémens d'odontalgie, Paris, 1756, in-12.
- Traité des dépôts dans le sinus maxillaire, des fractures et des caries de l'une et de l'autre mâchoire; suivi de réflexions et d'observations sur toutes les opérations de l'art du dentiste, Paris, 1760, in-12.
- Essai sur la formation des dents, comparée avec celle des os; suivi de plusieurs expériences, tant sur les os que sur les parties qui entrent dans leur constitution, Paris, 1766, in-12.
- Le Médecin des dames, ou l'art de les conserver en santé, with Goulin, Paris, 1771, in-12.
- Le Médecin des hommes, depuis la puberté jusqu'à l'extrême vieillesse, with Goulin, Paris, 1772, in-8°.
- Préceptes de santé, ou introduction au dictionnaire de santé, contestant les moyens de corriger les vices de son tempérament, et de le fortifier par le seul secours du régime et de l'exercice, ou l'art de conserver sa santé et de prévenir les maladies, Paris, 1772, in-8°. (this work was anonymous)
- Traité des maladies et des opérations réellement chirurgicales de la bouche et des parties qui y correspondent; suivi de notes, d'observations intéressantes, tant anciennes que modernes, Paris, 1778, 2 vol. in-8°.(this work was anonymous)

== Sources ==
- Jean-Eugène Dezeimeris, Dictionnaire historique de la médecine ancienne et moderne, ou Précis de l'histoire générale, technologique et littéraire de la médecine, Bruxelles, Béchet jeune, 1836, p. 286-7.
