= Card paradox =

Paradox

The card paradox is a variant of the liar paradox constructed by Philip Jourdain. It is also known as the postcard paradox, Jourdain paradox or Jourdain's paradox.

== The paradox ==
Suppose there is a card with statements printed on both sides:

Front:	The sentence on the other side of this card is True.
Back:	The sentence on the other side of this card is False.

Trying to assign a truth value to either of them leads to a paradox.

1. If the first statement is true, then so is the second. But if the second statement is true, then the first statement is false. It follows that if the first statement is true, then the first statement is false.
2. If the first statement is false, then the second is false, too. But if the second statement is false, then the first statement is true. It follows that if the first statement is false, then the first statement is true.

The same mechanism applies to the second statement. Neither of the sentences employs (direct) self-reference, instead this is a case of circular reference. Yablo's paradox is a variation of the liar paradox that is intended to not even rely on circular reference.
