= Philippe Jullian =

French illustrator, art historian and biographer

- Born: 11 July 1919; Bordeaux, France
- Died: 25 September 1977 (aged 58); Paris, France
- Occupations: writer, illustrator
- Relatives: Camille Jullian (grandfather)
- Writing career
- Language: French
- Period: 20th century
- Genres: Biography, fiction, art history, autobiography

Philippe Jullian (real name: Philippe Simounet; 11 July 1919 – 25 September 1977) was a French illustrator, art historian, biographer, aesthete, novelist and dandy.

== Early life ==
Jullian was born in Bordeaux in 1919. His maternal grandfather was the historian Camille Jullian, known for his multi-volume history of Gaul; his mother had married a man named Simounet, a war veteran whose life ended in poverty and whose name Philippe rejected in favour of his more distinguished grandfather's.

Jullian studied literature at university but left to pursue drawing and painting. In his later years, he resided in England but regularly spent winters in Africa. He also travelled extensively in India and Egypt.

== Works ==
One of his first officially noted works was the first "artist's" label for the famous wine from Château Mouton Rothschild in 1945, in memory of the World War II victory over Germany.

Jullian's book illustrations are witty, ornate, and often grotesque. He produced illustrations for his own books as well as works by Honoré de Balzac, Colette, Fyodor Dostoevsky, Ronald Firbank, Marcel Proust, and Oscar Wilde, among others. His books and articles on Art Nouveau, Symbolism, and other art movements of the fin-de-siècle helped bring about a revival of interest in the period. These include the biography Robert de Montesquiou (1965), Prince of Aesthetes (1967), Esthétes et Magiciens (1969) translated as Dreamers of Decadence (1971), Les Symbolistes (1973), and The Triumph of Art Nouveau (1974). Among others, he admired French painter Antonio de La Gandara. A collector, he published his autobiography, La Brocante, which detailed the "love of small objects", in 1975.

Works of fiction by Jullian dealt with the decadent, sensual, and macabre. He explored the themes of homoeroticism, sado-masochism, transvestism and the aesthetic life. His gift for satire is evident both in fiction such as La Fuite en Egypte (1968; published as The Flight into Egypt, 1970) and in his works of social satire, including Dictionnaire du Snobisme ("The Snob-Spotter's Guide", 1958), Les Collectioneurs ("The Collectors", 1967), and most notably his collaboration with the British novelist Angus Wilson, For Whom the Cloche Tolls: A Scrap-Book of the Twenties (1953), which he also illustrated.

Other books include Montmartre (1977) and Les Orientalistes (1977), works of art history; and biographies of Edward VII (1962), Wilde (1967), Gabriele D'Annunzio (1971), Jean Lorrain (1974), Violet Trefusis (1976), and Sarah Bernhardt.

Jullian's Journal, 1940–1950 (published 2009) documents his experiences and responses to the German occupation of France. On 22 March 1944 he wrote:

The twenty days I spent in the country were quite pleasant, and I take no pleasure in returning to Paris. One is awfully tired of feeling irritated all the time. The atmosphere is tense with raids, the fear of departures to Germany. An uncertain period, cowardly for those who aren't heroes.

An article written by Jullian appeared in 1977 in the Architectural Digest about the Shah of Iran's new palace.

== Death ==
In the 1970s Jullian experienced a series of personal tragedies: the death of his friend Violet Trefusis in 1972; the destruction of many of his possessions, including his pictures after a fire broke out in his apartment; and in September 1977 the stabbing to death by a stranger of his Moroccan manservant and companion, Hamoud, on whom he had increasingly depended. Five days afterwards he committed suicide by hanging.

== Bibliography ==
- For Whom the Cloche Tolls: A Scrap-book of the Twenties (with Angus Wilson), London: Methuen (1953)
- Scraps, London: Frederick Muller (1961)
- My Lord, Paris: Albin Michel (1961)
- The Collectors, London: Sidgwick & Jackson (1967)
- Edward and the Edwardians, London: Sidgwick & Jackson (1967)
- Robert de Montesquiou: A Fin-de-Siècle Prince, London: Secker & Warburg (1967)
  - (US ed.) Prince of Aesthetes: Count Robert de Montesquiou 1855–1921, New York: Viking (1968)
- Oscar Wilde, London: Constable (1969)
  - (US ed.) Oscar Wilde: A Gallic View of His Whole Extraordinary Career, Drawing on Fresh Sources, New York: Viking (1969)
  - (New ed.) Oscar Wilde (with Jonathan Harris), London: Constable & Robinson (1994)
- The Flight into Egypt. A Fantasy, London: Elek Books (1970)
- Dreamers Of Decadence: Symbolist Painters of the 1890s, London: Pall Mall Press (1971)
- D'Annunzio, London: Pall Mall Press (1972); New York: Viking (1973)
- The Symbolists, Oxford: Phaidon Press (1973)
- The Triumph of Art Nouveau: Paris Exhibition 1900, Oxford: Phaidon Press (1974)
- Le Style Second Empire, Paris: Baschet et Cie (1975)
- Violet Trefusis: Life and Letters (with John Phillips), London: Hamish Hamilton (1976)
  - (US ed.) The Other Woman: A Life of Violet Trefusis, Including Previously Unpublished Correspondence With Vita Sackville-West, New York: Houghton Mifflin (1976)
  - (New ed.) Violet Trefusis: A Biography, Harvest (1985)
- De Meyer (edited by Robert Brandau), London: Thames & Hudson (1976)
- Montmartre, Oxford: Phaidon Press (1977)
- The Orientalists: European Painters of Eastern Scenes, Oxford: Phaidon Press (1977)
- Sarah Bernhardt, Paris: Balland (1977)
- Le Style Louis XVI, Paris: Baschet et Cie (1977)
- La Belle Époque, New York: The Metropolitan Museum of Art (1982)
