= Charles Clay (surgeon) =

British surgeon

- Born: 27 December 1801; Bredbury, England
- Died: 18 September 1893 (aged 91); Poulton-le-Fylde, England
- Occupations: Surgeon, writer
- Relatives: Eleanor Jourdain (granddaughter); Francis Charles Robert Jourdain (grandson); Margaret Jourdain (granddaughter); Philip Jourdain (grandson)

Charles Clay (27 December 1801 – 18 September 1893) was an English surgeon, called the "Father of Ovariotomy".

== Life ==
Clay was born in Bredbury, near Stockport, Cheshire, and died in Poulton-le-Fylde, near Blackpool, Lancashire.

He began his medical education as a pupil of Kinder Wood in Manchester (where he used to attend John Dalton's lectures on chemistry), and in 1821 went to Edinburgh to continue his studies there. Qualifying in 1823, he began a general practice in Ashton-under-Lyne, where he also taught chemistry at the Mechanics Institute. At this point he was a pledged teetotaller and supporter of the temperance movement. In 1839 he removed to Manchester to practise as an operative and consulting surgeon. It was there that, in 1842, he first performed the operation of ovariotomy with which his name is associated. On this occasion it was perfectly successful, and when in 1865 he published an analysis of the cases he was able to show a mortality only slightly above 30%.

Clay was an opponent of vivisection.

== Ovariotomy ==
Although his merits in this matter have sometimes been denied, his claim to the title Father of Ovariotomy is now generally conceded, and it is admitted that he deserves the credit not only of having shown how that operation could be made a success, but also of having played an important part in the advance of abdominal surgery for which the 19th century was conspicuous. A number of manuscripts previously owned by Clay are held by Special Collections at the University of Manchester Library and include a record of some of the ovariotomy (oophorectomy) operations he performed between 1855 and 1869.

== Geology, archaeology, numismatics ==
In spite of the claims of a heavy practice, Clay found time for the pursuit of geology and archaeology. Among the books of which he was the author were a volume of Geological Sketches of Manchester (1839) and a History of the Currency of the Isle of Man (1849), and his collections included over a thousand editions of the Old and New Testaments and a remarkably complete series of the silver and copper coins of the United States. He was a founder member and President of the Manchester Numismatic Society from 1864 until its dissolution in 1873.

Professional and academic associations
Preceded by Creation	President of the Manchester Numismatic Society; 1864–73	Succeeded by Dissolution

== Sources ==
- Brockbank, E. M. (1929) "The Hospitals of Manchester and Salford." In: Book of Manchester and Salford. Manchester: Falkner & Co. Includes portrait of Dr Clay
- Dyson, Reverend Simeon "The Unfinished Biography of The Reverend Simeon Dyson"
- Power, D'Arcy (1901). "Clay, Charles" . In Lee, Sidney (ed.). Dictionary of National Biography (1st supplement). London: Smith, Elder & Co.
