= Prince Regent (TV series) =

- DVD cover
- Genre: Period drama
- Written by: Ian Curteis
- Directed by: Michael Simpson; Michael Hayes
- Starring: Peter Egan; Nigel Davenport; Keith Barron
- Theme music composer: Carl Davis
- Country of origin: United Kingdom
- Original language: English
- No. of episodes: 8

Production
- Producer: Colin Tucker
- Running time: 50 minutes
- Production company: BBC

Original release
- Network: BBC1
- Release: 4 September – 30 October 1979

Prince Regent is a British eight-part television period drama made and transmitted by the BBC in 1979. It depicts the life of George IV from his youth time as prince regent and his reign as King. It consists of eight episodes of 50 minutes.

The series stars Peter Egan as George IV throughout his youth, regency, and first year of his reign, with Nigel Davenport as King George III, and Susannah York as Maria Fitzherbert. It was primarily directed by Michael Simpson, with Michael Hayes directing the fourth episode, and primarily written by Robert Muller, as well as Nemone Lethbridge, Ian Curteis, and Reg Gadney in other episodes.

== Cast ==
- Peter Egan as George, Prince of Wales, later King George IV
- Nigel Davenport as King George III
- Keith Barron as Charles James Fox
- Frances White as Queen Charlotte
- Susannah York as Maria Fitzherbert
- Dinah Stabb as Princess Caroline, later Queen Caroline
- Bosco Hogan as Prince Frederick, Duke of York and Albany
- David Horovitch as Colonel Lake
- Clive Merrison as Richard Brinsley Sheridan
- Barbara Shelley as Lady Isabella Hertford
- Caroline Blakiston as Lady Frances Jersey
- Cherie Lunghi as Princess Charlotte of Wales
- Patsy Kensit as Young Charlotte
- Rupert Frazer as Prince Leopold
- David Collings as William Pitt the Younger
- Murray Head as George Canning
- David Pinner as Prince William, Duke of Clarence, later King William IV
- Ralph Nossek as Dr Francis Willis
- Katy Durham-Matthews as Princess Mary
- Chrissy Iddon as Mary Robinson
- Robert Hartley as Lord Jersey
- Pat Nye as Frau Schwellenberg
- André van Gyseghem as Lord Liverpool
- Geoffrey Chater as Henry Addington
- John Rowe as Henry Holland
- Jo Kendall as Elizabeth Conyngham
- Elizabeth Power as Lady Effingham
- Tony Aitken as William, Prince of Orange
- John Gabriel as Spencer Perceval

== Episodes ==
No.	Title	Directed by	Written by	Original release date
1	"Mad for Love"	Michael Simpson	Robert Muller	4 September 1979
Seventeen-year-old George, Prince of Wales, the eldest son and heir apparent of King George III, desires to continue his military training alongside his brother Prince Frederick in Germany, and is determined to remain in his father's good graces in order for him to pay George's debts in full. While at court, George sights Maria Fitzherbert and is instantly allured, despite her being a twice widowed Roman Catholic commoner. The King, upset by George's irresponsibility and extravagance, reveals that George will not continue his military service in Germany, and that Frederick is to go alone. A greatly dismayed George resolves to continue his spending and public liaison with actress Mary Robinson, whilst the King attempts to put a stop to it by means of further restriction. Meanwhile, signs of the King's mental illness worsen. George, having come of age, finally meets Fitzherbert and decides he is in love with her. However, Fitzherbert is reluctant of his advances given her propriety and his affairs with other women. George is further met with deterrence of her Roman Catholicism, and how such a marriage would result in his forfeiting the British throne, even if his father consents to the union. As George is determined to marry her, a reluctant Fitzherbert resolves to leave England. George implores Colonel Lake to intercept Fitzherbert and urge her to return home as George threatens his own life. Concerned for the Prince's health, Fitzherbert returns and finally agrees to marry him. George and Maria are secretly married on 15 December 1785.
2	"Put Not Your Trust in Princes"	Michael Simpson	Nemone Lethbridge	11 September 1979
Rumours of George and Maria's marriage is met with public concern over the Protestant succession. Though a marriage to a Roman Catholic would mean George's exclusion in the line of succession, the marriage is legally void as laid by the Royal Marriages Act 1772 for the marriage was carried out without the consent of the British monarch. George and Maria finally decide to leave to Brighton away from the British public, however Charles James Fox and Richard Sheridan are in hope that the seclusion would pull them apart. George returns to England in hopes of an increased income for him and Maria, however Fox warns him of consequences of such provision given his relationship with a Catholic, and George is implored by Fox and Sheridan to return to Brighton to little avail against George's impatience. George asks Independent MP Nathaniel Newham to introduce George's financial desires in the House of Commons, subjecting Fox and Sheridan to parliamentary scrutiny over George's affairs with Maria. Fox openly denies the marriage, greatly upsetting Maria, citing the trouble the marriage has caused, and she decides to leave him. Amid a threat to Fox's political reputation, Fox leaves for Italy. Meanwhile, Maria is still well received in society, and George is encouraged to meet her again in belief she would be more open to him. This notion proves right, for Maria agrees to return to him. Meanwhile as Prince Frederick returns to England, the King's mental illness is becoming more apparent and concerns begin to arise. Queen Charlotte seeks medical help in fear of the King's mental state, and William Pitt suggests medical treatment by doctors Francis Willis and his son John. Dr Willis has the King confined, with sole authority as his treatment. Concern for the King also breeds concern for the role of head of state; Sheridan proposes the prospect of a regency bill that would allow George to rule as proxy to his father, much to George's interest and Frederick's disagreement. Upon Fox's return to England, George consults him on the matter. Pitt, who has a majority in the House of Commons, supports George as regent however elects to heavily restrict him. However, before the Regency bill could be put to a vote, the King miraculously recovers, allowing Pitt to delay the bill to George's outrage.
3	"The Bride from Brunswick"	Michael Simpson	Robert Muller	18 September 1979
Following the King's recovery, George assures him that he is to break off his relationship with Maria on the agreement that the King settles his debts. The King is more concerned with George's marriage, and stipulates that George will marry freely on condition the suitor is a Protestant princess. The choices fall to Princess Louise of Mecklenburg-Strelitz, a maternal first cousin of George as the niece of Queen Charlotte, or Princess Caroline of Brunswick, a paternal first cousin of George as the daughter of Princess Augusta of Great Britain, the King's elder sister. The King, however, finds his niece a more appropriate suitor, and instructs Lord Malmesbury to go to the Brunswick court after completing diplomatic business with the Prussians for Caroline's hand in marriage to George. George, however, is less enthused on the princess, and Queen Charlotte heartily detests her as well. Furthermore, at the eccentric Brunswick court, Malmesbury finds Caroline to be ill-mannered, obnoxious, and extremely obstinate and offensive. Caroline isn't to keen on George, either, spurred by his affairs, especially with Lady Jersey. However eager to leave Brunswick, Caroline agrees to go to England. But upon meeting her George is displeased, finding her hideous and acrid. Caroline, likewise, is displeased with George and the impoliteness of the British court. Despite George's reservations of Caroline, the King rejects calling off the affair without refusal of eradicating George's debts as agreed. George reluctantly goes forth with the union, and he and Caroline are married on 8 April 1795. However, the night of the wedding proves an unhappy future.
4	"The Trouble with Women"	Michael Hayes	Robert Muller	25 September 1979
Caroline, George's new 'official' wife and Princess of Wales, is received well and doted on by the British people, unfortunately for George who is wholly unsatisfied with the marriage. Likewise, there is hostility between Caroline and Lady Jersey, one George's mistresses; on the other hand, the King is charmed by his niece, and, by virtue of Parliament, has increased George's allowance to £120,000 a year, though even with this increase, the greater mount of his debts and the ongoing war with the French will guarantee George's debt for years to come, much to the King's delight. Though he feels cheated, George becomes open to Caroline and him tolerating each other for their future comfort, however to no avail. George discovers that Maria, having left for the country, has returned to London, and is further told by Lady Jersey that Caroline is pregnant. Lady Jersey expresses to George her irritation with the impertinence of Caroline, and reveals her gossip of the private life of he and Caroline. George therefore restricts her and is open of his displeasure. Caroline later gives birth to a girl, Princess Charlotte. With a hearty desire to have Caroline away and out of the care of their daughter, George bequeaths all his possession to Maria, the "wife of his heart and soul," in his last will and testament, declaring his lasting love for her; he leaves Caroline a single shilling. Lady Jersey consults William Pitt on the prospect of a separation between George and Caroline on George's behalf. Pitt elects to try to bring the matter to the King, with George demanding separation. The King, however, rejects the prospect on the foundation that George has a duty to bear Caroline, the future queen, more children though the King does agree in turn for George and Caroline to have separate estates. Caroline agrees to this, however demands George acknowledge her as Princess of Wales and future queen, and has Lady Jersey dismissed as her Lady of the Bedchamber. Caroline is virtually given liberty to do what she pleases. George attempts to receive Maria's favour, however though her feelings are unfaltering, Maria refuses him. However, at Frederick's persuasion, Maria agrees to meet him. George subsequently dismisses his mistresses, including Lady Jersey. Maria agrees that if their marriage is validated by the Catholic Church, she will return to him.
5	"Father and Son"	Michael Simpson	Ian Curteis	9 October 1979
Maria informs George of her wish for them adopt Minnie, a daughter the late George Seymour (Lord Hugh Seymour in real life) whom was entrusted with Maria whilst Seymour was abroad. In addition, concerns for the King's health arise once again within the court; the King's physician, Dr Gisborne, is apprehensive of the Willises' methods of treatment, but Frederick, with Queen Charlotte's support, allows the King to be again taken into treatment by the Willises. The King is discovered to be in distress and is plagued with gout; George and his brothers Frederick and Prince William agree that their father is less capable of being head of state, and suggest a reintroduction of the Regency Bill 1789 to Henry Addington, who suggests they consult prime minister William Pitt. George believes the Willises are only driven by financial gain, others around him believing that they wish to control the King. Though the King wished to attend the court drawing room event as desired by his wife the Queen, the King relapses. The Willises agree to return to London and for Gisborne to resume his treatment. As the King begins to recover, he urges George to terminate his relationship with Maria and reconcile with Caroline, who resides in Blackheath amongst a multitude of children, including their own child Charlotte. With Addington and the Queen wary of another relapse, the King is again put under the care of Willis. Meanwhile, the King, enraged, refuses to give royal assent to parliamentary bills until he is released. Whilst a motion is put to Parliament regarding high command for George amidst the planned invasion of UK, Maria's desired adoption of Minnie Seymour is opposed by her father's will executors on the basis of Maria being a Catholic. Lady Isabella Hertford suggests that she instead adopts the child on behalf of Maria, to her relief. Fox and Sheridan informs George the motion was not voted in George's favour, whilst his brother's received positions in high command, outraging George; he tries to appeal to the King, who rejects his military employment through letters George later publishes to the press, upsetting his father. Caroline's desire to adopt a young boy called William Austin makes her vulnerable to attack when rumours arise of her being the boy's biological mother by means of infidelity, rumours that come to George's interest. George, in hopes of being free of his marriage, sends his brother William to coax one of Caroline's companions, Lady Charlotte Douglas, who is partly behind the rumours, to put the account in writing. Lady Douglas confirms these accounts via letter, and William forwards it to the King, who instructs Prime Minister Lord Grenville to form an inquiry of adultery against Caroline as well as the paternity of William Austin.
6	"God Save the King"	Michael Simpson	Robert Muller	16 October 1979
7	"Milk and Honey"	Michael Simpson	Reg Gadney	23 October 1979
8	"Defeat...and Victory"	Michael Simpson	Reg Gadney	30 October 1979
Queen Charlotte dies in the company of George, and two years later the King dies in the company of his son Frederick, with George subsequently becoming king. George becomes determined to divorce Caroline on the grounds of infidelity and assembles support in putting the suit to trial as Caroline returns to England to assume her position as queen consort. The trial ends with a majority in favor of Caroline remaining Queen of the United Kingdom and the rejection of the divorce, much to George's dismay. He announces his intent to abdicate the throne in favour of his brother Frederick, however finally decides to remain as king and enjoy his position, beginning with his coronation.

== Awards ==
The series won the make-up award (Toni Chapman) at the 1979 BAFTA television awards, and was nominated in the design (Barry Newbury, Barrie Dobbins), costume design (Raymond Hughes) and television cameraman (Rodney Taylor) categories.

== Home release ==
Prince Regent is available on DVD in the UK through Simply Media.
