= Camille Jullian =

French historian and philologist

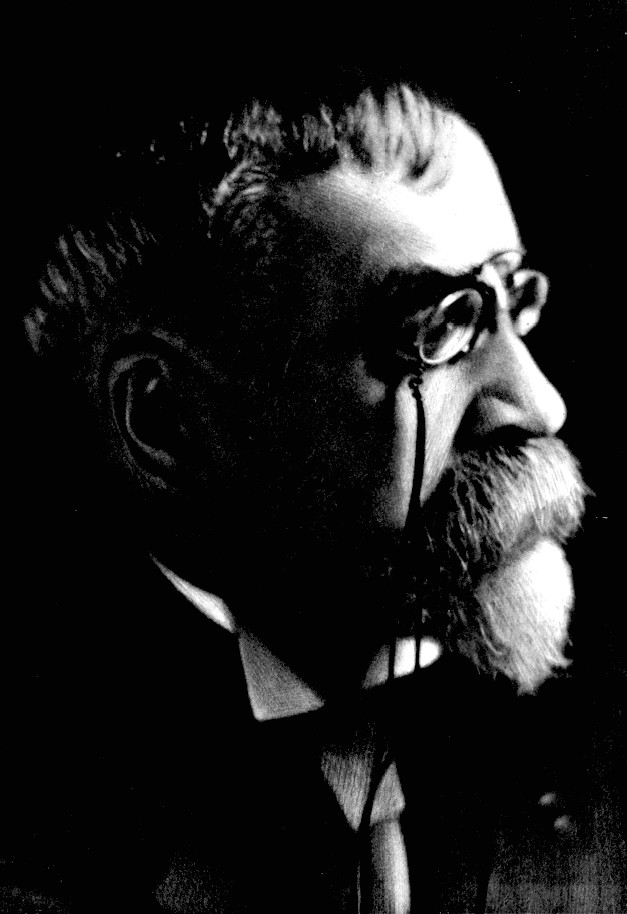
- Born: 15 March 1859; Marseille
- Died: 12 December 1933 (aged 74); Paris
- Citizenship: French
- Relatives: Philippe Jullian (grandson)

Academic background
- Education: École normale supérieure

Academic work
- Institutions: University of Bordeaux; Collège de France
- Notable works: Histoire de la Gaule (1907–1928)

Camille Jullian (15 March 1859 – 12 December 1933) was a French historian, philologist, archaeologist and historian of literature.

A Professor of ancient history and classics at the University of Bordeaux from 1891, Jullian was awarded a chair at the Collège de France in 1905, where he taught national antiquities until 1930. He was made Grand Officier de la Légion d'Honneur in 1926, and was elected to the Académie française in 1924.

Jullian is the author of a monumental Histoire de la Gaule ('History of Gaul'), published in eight volumes between 1907 and 1928, which has influenced Celtic studies throughout the 20th century.

== Biography ==
Camille Louis Jullian was born on 15 March 1859 in Marseille, the son of Camille Jullian, a merchant and banker, and Marie Rouvière. Jullian came from a Protestant family of farmers originally from Calvisson, Gard. He attended the lycée of Marseille between 1864 and 1877, then the École Normale Supérieure, where he earned an agrégation in history and geography in 1880. Jullian was a member of the École française de Rome between 1880 and 1882. He became Doctor in Literature in March 1884.

Jullian taught ancient history and classics at the University of Bordeaux between 1883 and 1905, becoming Professor in 1891, then was elected to the Collège de France in 1905, where he taught national antiquities until 1930. Jullian became a member of the Académie des Inscriptions et Belles-Lettres in 1908, was made Grand Officier de la Légion d'Honneur in 1926, and was elected to the Académie Française in 1924.

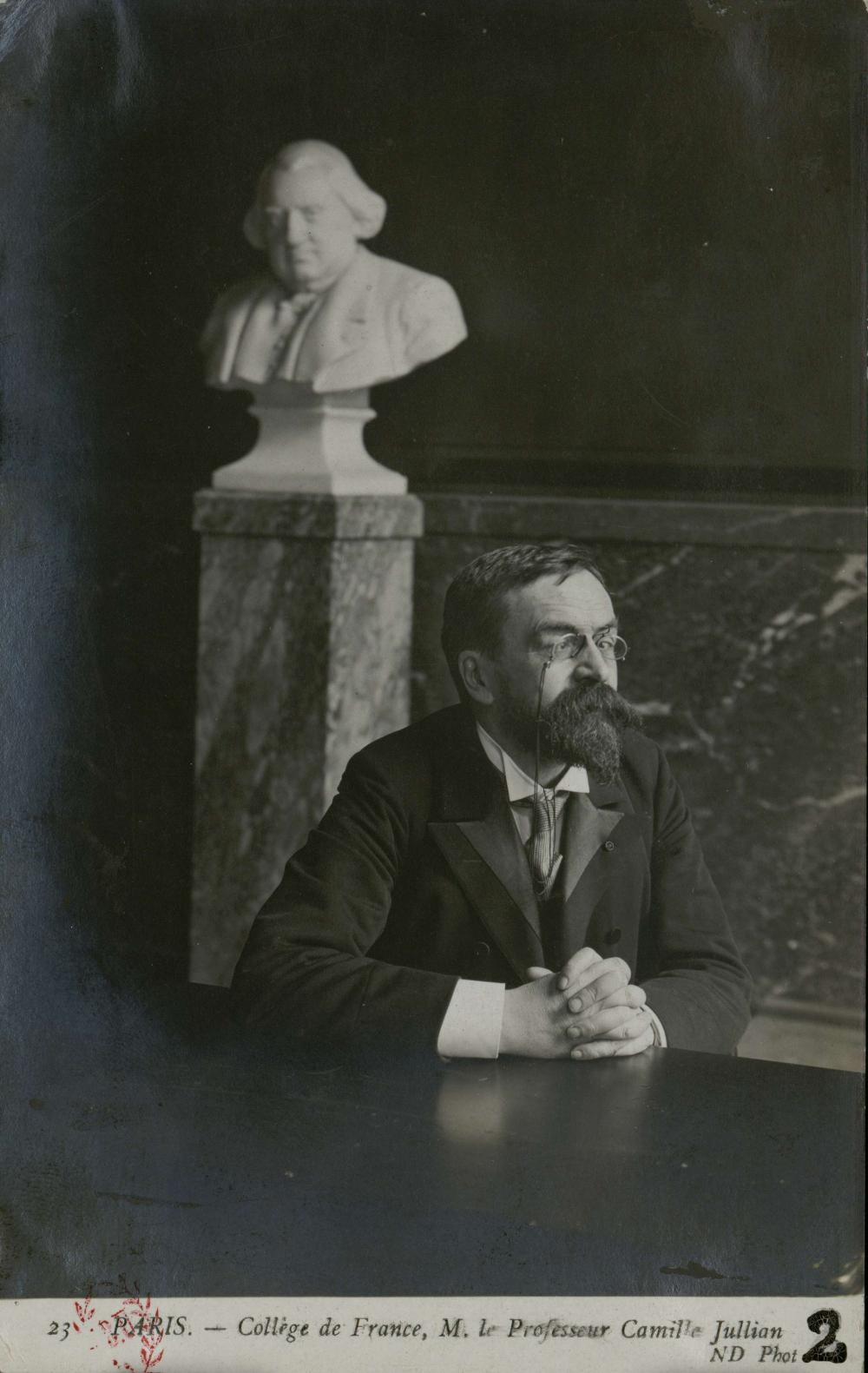
Jullian at the Collège de France.

Jullian was involved with the controversy over the archaeological findings of the Glozel artifacts in France. He adopted an intermediate position, arguing that some, but not all, of the discovered objects were authentic and dated to the Gallo-Roman period rather than the Neolithic.

He died on 12 December 1933 in the 6th arrondissement of Paris. His body is interred at the Protestant cemetery in Bordeaux.

== Personal life ==
Jullian was a Protestant. He held liberal and patriotic views.

In April 1890, Jullian married Jeanne Azam, the daughter of Étienne Azam, Professor of Medicine, and Anne Rolland. They had a daughter named Suzanne. The latter married a man named Simounet, a war veteran who ended his life in poverty; their son, the author Philippe Jullian, took instead his grandfather's name.

== Works ==
=== On Bordeaux and Gironde ===
- Étude d'épigraphie bordelaise. Les Bordelais dans l'armée romaine. Notes concernant les inscriptions de Bordeaux extraites des papiers de M. de Lamontagne, 1884
- Les antiquités de Bordeaux (Revue archéologique), 1885
- Inscriptions romaines de Bordeaux, 1887-1890 ^{[available online on the Cujas Library website: Vol. I, Vol. II ]}
- Ausone et Bordeaux. Études sur les derniers temps de la Gaule romaine, 1893 Read online
- Histoire de Bordeaux depuis les origines jusqu'en 1895, 1895 Read online
- L'orientalisme à Bordeaux. Bordeaux: Feret. 1897. Archived from the original on 2 April 2015.

=== Works on Gauls ===
- De protectoribus et domesticis augustorum, 1883
- Histoire des institutions politiques de l'ancienne France, de Fustel de Coulanges (posthumous edition of his works), 1890
- Gallia, tableau sommaire de la Gaule sous la domination romaine, Hachette, 1892
- Fréjus romain, 1886
- Notes d'épigraphie, 1886
- Les transformations politiques de l'Italie sous les empereurs romains, 43 av JC-330 après J.-C., 1884
- Extraits des historiens du XIXe, publiés, annotés et précédés d'une introduction sur l'histoire de France, 1897
- Inscriptiones Galliae narbonensis Latinae (CIL XII), en collaboration, 1899
- Vercingétorix. Paris: Hachette. 1901. Archived from the original on 2 April 2015.
- La politique romaine en Provence (218-59 avant notre ère), 1901
- Recherches sur la religion gauloise, 1903
- Plaidoyer pour la préhistoire, 1907
- Les anciens dieux de l'Occident, 1913
- Les Paris des Romains. Les Arènes. Les Thermes, 1924
- Histoire de la Gaule, rééd. Hachette, Coll. Références, 1993, 1270 pages, (ISBN 978-2010212178)
- Au seuil de notre histoire. Leçons faites au Collège de France, 1905–1930, 3 vol. 1930–1931
- Les invasions ibériques en Gaule et l'origine de Bordeaux. Bordeaux: Imp. G. Gounouilhou. 1903. Archived from the original on 2 April 2015.

=== Patriotic works ===
- Le Rhin gaulois : le Rhin français, 1915
- Pas de paix avec Hohenzollern. À un ami du front, 1918
- La guerre pour la patrie, 1919
- Aimons la France, conférences : 1914-1919, 1920
- De la Gaule à la France. Nos origines historiques, 1922

== Bibliography ==
- Charle, Christophe; Telkes, Eva (1988). "Jullian (Camille, Louis)". Publications de l'Institut national de recherche pédagogique. 3 (1): 111–113.
- Motte, Olivier (1990). Camille Jullian: les années de formation. École française de Rome. ISBN 978-2728302000.
