= Jean Goulin =

French physician

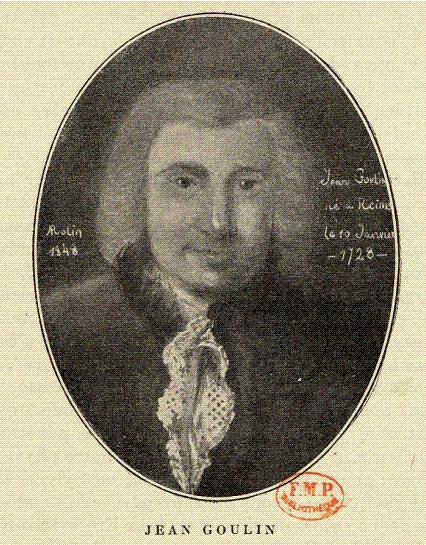
- Born: 10 January 1728; Reims
- Died: 30 April 1799 (aged 71); Paris
- Occupation: Physician

Jean Goulin (10 January 1728 – 30 April 1799) was an 18th-century French physician.

== Sources ==
- This article contains text from a document on the La vie rémoise site.
- Pierre Sue, Mémoire historique, littéraire et critique sur la vie et les ouvrages tant imprimés que manuscrits de Jean Goulin, Éditions Paris, Blanchon, 1800
- Huguet (F.) Les professeurs de la Faculté de médecine de Paris, dictionnaire biographique, 1794–1939.- Paris, 1991 (cote : 262917)
- Nicolas-Toussaint des Essarts, Les siècles littéraires de la France, ou Nouveau dictionnaire de tous les écrivains français
