= Ian Curteis =

British dramatist and television director (1935–2021)

Ian Bayley Curteis (1 May 1935 – 24 November 2021) was a British dramatist and television director.

== Life and career ==
Curteis was born in London on 1 May 1935, and began his career as an actor, joining Joan Littlewood's Theatre Workshop in the mid-1950s, and later working in this profession in regional theatres, and as a stage director or producer. His career in television began as a script reader for both the BBC and Granada Television. Curteis joined the staff of the BBC as a trainee director in 1964. The Projected Man (1966), which he directed, is his only cinema film. Around the same time Curteis directed an episode of the BBC2 anthology series, Out of the Unknown, William Trevor's "Walk's End". Both projects had a problematic production; Curteis has disputed the claims of the producers of both.

Switching to a career as a television dramatist from the late 1960s onwards, Curteis wrote for many series of the time, including The Onedin Line and Crown Court. Meanwhile, Curteis was writing television plays - he preferred the term over "drama documentaries" - with historical themes. Philby, Burgess and Maclean was commissioned by Granada, and broadcast in 1977. In autumn 1979 came Churchill and the Generals, Suez 1956, and the 8-part series Prince Regent, about George IV. Lost Empires, a television adaptation of J. B. Priestley's novel followed in 1986.

The Falklands Play, originally scheduled for production in 1985, was eventually broadcast in 2002. At the time production was cancelled, Curteis blamed a "liberal conspiracy" at the BBC. A BBC commission for a dramatisation of the Yalta Conference in 1945 was cancelled in 1995, Curteis alleged, because of his politically conservative presentation of events. A stage play, The Bargain (2007), dealing with a fictionalised account of the meeting between Robert Maxwell and Mother Teresa in 1988 was adapted for BBC Radio in 2016.

Curteis divorced his first wife, Dorothy Curteis, and his second, the novelist Joanna Trollope. His third wife was Lady Deirdre (formerly Lady Grantley), daughter of William Hare, 5th Earl of Listowel; they married in 2001 in the chapel of Markenfield Hall, which had been restored to a great extent by her previous husband. This was the first wedding to be held there for some 400 years. The couple continued restoration projects which were expected to be ongoing until 2030.

He died on 24 November 2021, at the age of 86.

== Filmography ==
- The Indian Tales of Rudyard Kipling: Watches of the Night (1964) director
- Pity About the Abbey (1965) director
- Out of the Unknown: Walk's End (1966) director
- The Projected Man (1966) director (feature film)
- ITV Saturday Night Theatre: The Haunting (1969) writer
- Thirty-Minute Theatre: A Distinct Chill (1971) writer
- The Onedin Line (1971) various episodes, writer
- Spy Trap (1972) writer
- Doomwatch: Flood (1972) writer
- The Edwardians (1972) writer
- The Regiment: Riot (1973) writer
- Sutherland's Law (1973) writer
- Barlow at Large 3 episodes (1974–75) writer
- Victorian Scandals: The Portland Millions (1976) writer
- Crown Court 6 episodes (1974–77) writer
- Philby, Burgess and Maclean (1977) writer
- The Cedar Tree (ATV, 1977) writer, 2 episodes
- People Like Us (1978) adaptation
- Churchill and the Generals (1979) writer
- Atom Spies (1979) writer
- Prince Regent (1979) writer
- Suez 1956 (1979) writer
- Miss Morison's Ghosts (1981) writer
- Lost Empires (1986) adaptation
- The Nightmare Years (1990) writer
- The Choir (1995) adaptation
- The Falklands Play (2002) writer
