= Antonio de La Gándara =

French painter (1861–1917)

Antonio de La Gandara
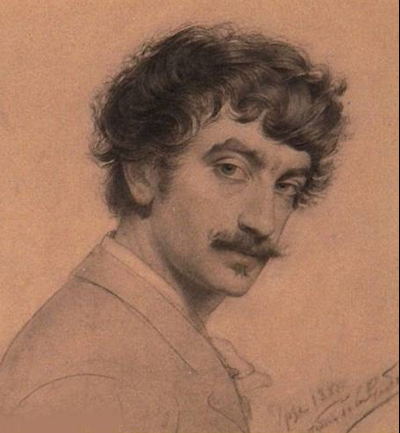
- Self-portrait, 1888.
- Born: Antonio de La Gandara; 16 December 1861; Paris, France
- Died: 30 June 1917 (aged 55); Paris, France
- Resting place: Le Cimetière Père Lachaise, Paris, France (Père Lachaise Cemetery)
- Education: Jean-Léon Gérôme, Alexandre Cabanel
- Known for: Drawing, painting, lithographs, illustrations
- Notable work: Portrait de la Comtesse de Noailles; Portrait d'Ida Rubinstein; Portrait de Romaine Brooks; Portrait de Charlotte de La Gandara; Portrait de la comtesse de Montebello (1892); Portrait de Robert De Montesquiou
- Movement: Belle Époque
- Awards: Mention honorable, Salon des artistes français, 1884; Bronze medal, Exposition Universelle, 1889; Silver medal, Exposition Universelle, 1900; Chevalier de la Legion d'honneur, 1900

Antonio de La Gándara (16 December 1861 – 30 June 1917) was a French painter, pastellist and draughtsman of the Belle Époque.

== Early life ==
La Gándara was born in Paris, France, but his father was of Spanish ancestry, born in San Luis Potosí, Mexico, and his mother was from England. La Gándara's talent was strongly influenced by both cultures. At only 15 years of age, La Gándara was admitted as a student of Jean-Léon Gérôme and Cabanel at the École des Beaux-Arts. Soon, he was recognized by the jury of the 1883 Salon des Champs-Élysées, who singled out the first work he ever exhibited: a portrait of Saint Sebastian.

== Career ==
Less than ten years later, young La Gándara had become one of the favourite artists of the Paris élite. His models included Countess Greffulhe, the Grand Duchess of Mecklenburg, Clara Ward - Princesse de Caraman-Chimay, Prince Edmond de Polignac, the Prince de Sagan, Charles Leconte de Lisle, Paul Verlaine, Leonor Uriburu de Anchorena, Sarah Bernhardt, Romaine Brooks, Jean Moreas, Winnaretta Singer, and Virginie Amélie Avegno Gautreau (seen below, and more famously portrayed by John Singer Sargent in his painting Madame X). Influenced by Chardin, his skill is demonstrated in his portraits, in a simplicity with the finest detail, or in the serenity of his scenes of the bridges, parks, and streets of Paris.

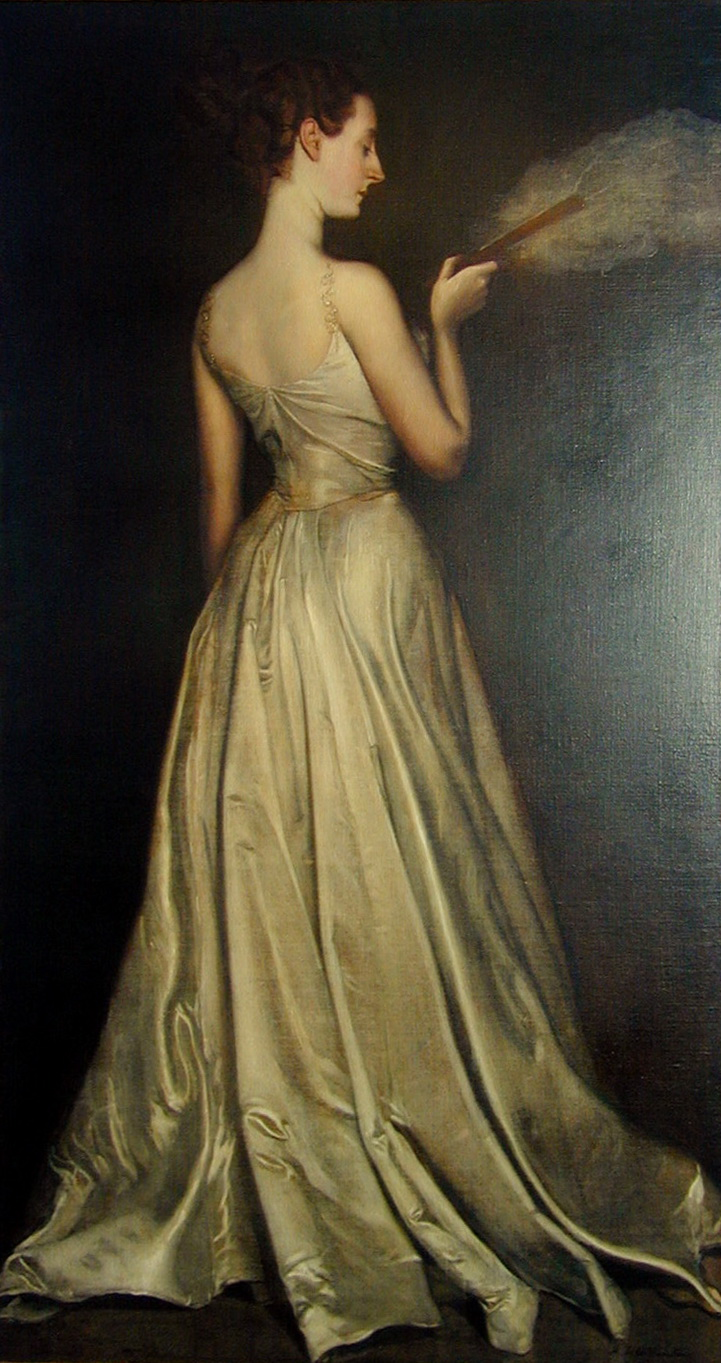
Madame Pierre Gautreau, 1898

Gandara illustrated a small number of publications, including Les Danaïdes by Camille Mauclair. With James McNeill Whistler, Jean-Louis Forain, and Yamamoto, La Gándara illustrated Les Chauves-Souris ("The Bats") by the French poet Robert de Montesquiou. The book, published in 1893, has become a rare collector's item.

The first exhibition of La Gándara's work organised in New York by Durand-Ruel in 1898 was a major success and confirmed the painter as one of the masters of his time. Major newspapers and magazines routinely reproduced his portraits, several of which made the front page of publications like the fashionable Le Figaro magazine. Gandara participated in the most important exhibitions in Paris, Brussels, Berlin, Dresden, Barcelona and Saragossa.

In 2025 a full overview of his work has been presented in a catalogue raisonné.

== Death ==
La Gándara died on 30 June 1917, and was interred in Père Lachaise Cemetery, Paris. Although his fame faded rapidly after his death, growing interest in the 20th century saw him regain popularity as a key witness to the art of his time, not only through his canvases, but also as the model chosen by the novelists Jean Lorrain and Marcel Proust, and through the anecdotes of his own life narrated by Edmond de Goncourt, Georges-Michel, and Montesquiou.

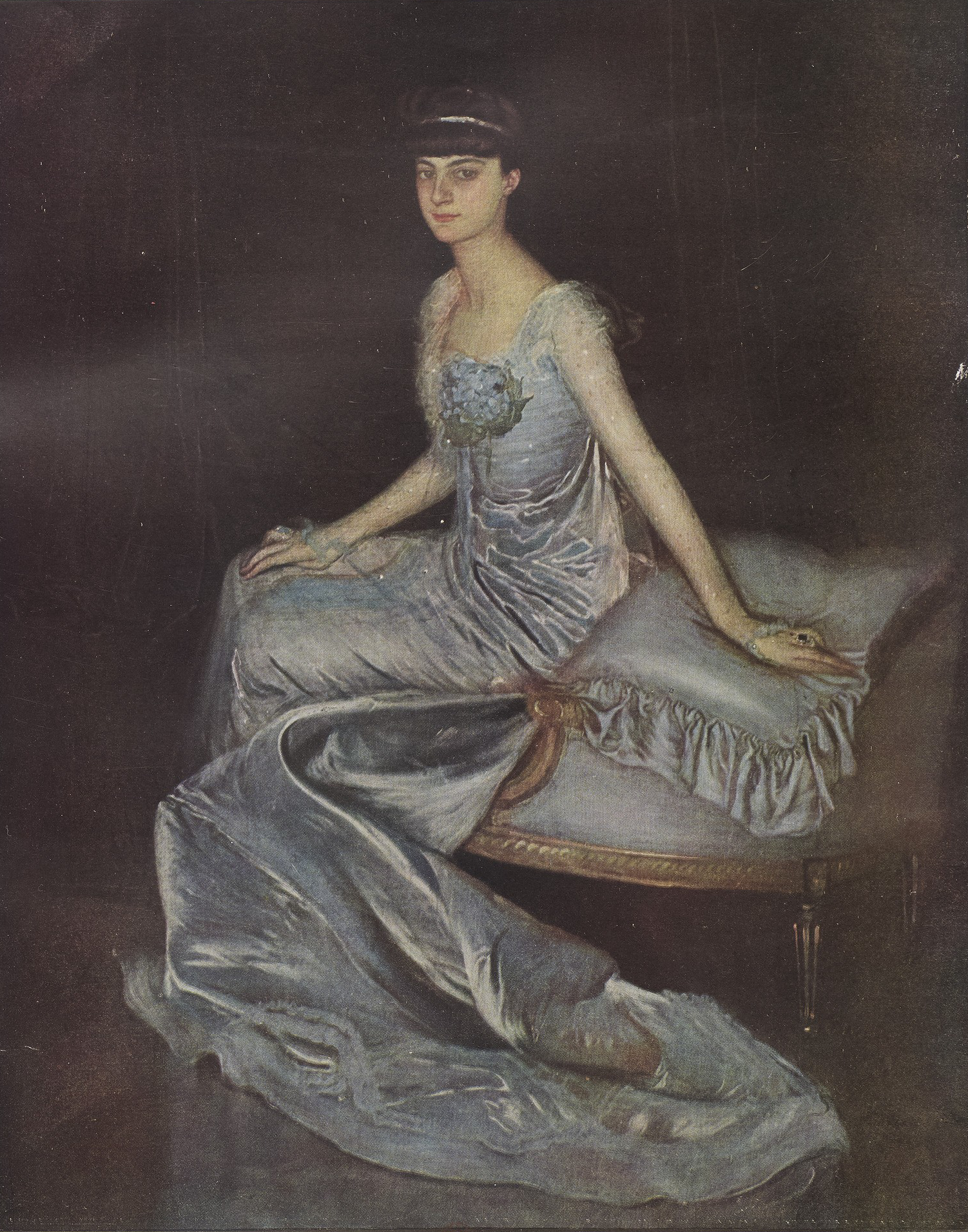
Comtesse Mathieu de Noailles (la Gandara)

On 3 November 2018, a major retrospective opened for four months at the Musée Lambinet in Versailles, bringing together more than one hundred works by the painter as well as many documents. The exhibition curator was Xavier Mathieu.

A novel was published by the Editions L'Harmattan in 2018 that treats La Gándara's life: Antonio de La Gandara – The Gentleman painter of the Belle Epoque.

Antonio, my brother, was talented, compassionate when confronted with misery and sorrow, understanding and generous. The protagonist of this story fought to succeed, fought to be admired by his daughters, and kept his integrity intact as the world in which he grew up commonly demonstrated pitilessness towards those who deviated from the path imposed by the good morals of people of good morals, by the tastes of people of good taste and by the arrogance of the vain. (...) Until, now, I had lacked the audacity to divulge what I longed to say. Having, at last, mustered the courage to defend my brother, I decided to break my silence and share our story with the accuracy to which I aspire despite the years which have passed.

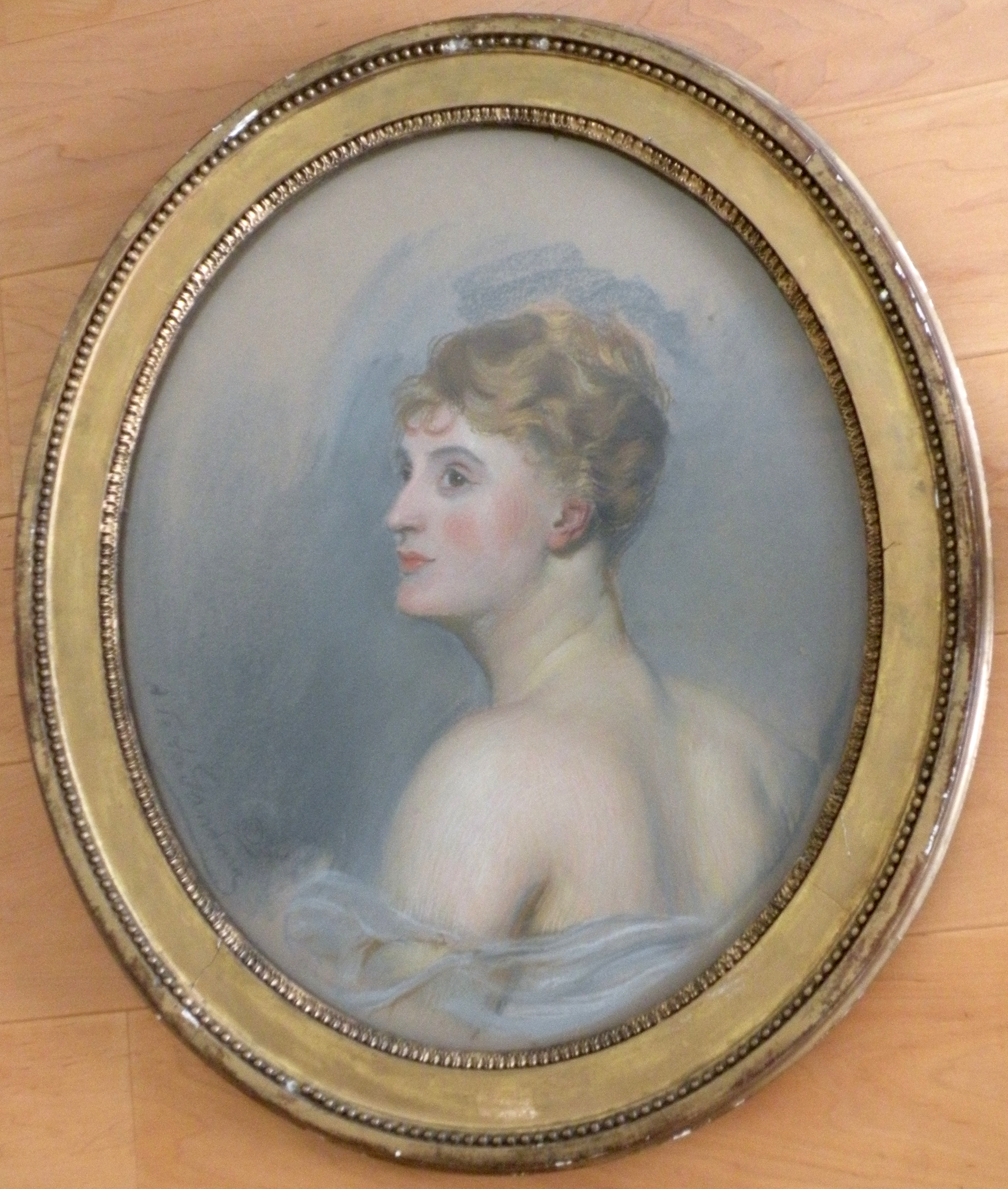
Antonio De La Gandara - Elegante en cheveux, pastel on canvas 62x51cm ovale

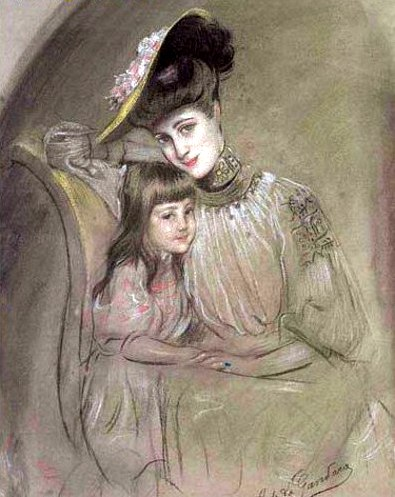
Antonio de La Gandara – Portrait de la fille Klotz – Mère et enfant

== Literature ==
- Jumeau-Lafond, Jean-David, "Antonio de La Gandara. Un témoin de la Belle époque, 1861–1917", La Tribune de l'Art, http://www.latribunedelart.com/antonio-de-la-gandara-un-temoin-de-la-belle-epoque-1861-1917
- Gabriel Badea-Päun, "Antonio de La Gandara (1861–1917), un portratiste mondain oublié, un parcours, un réseau, une mode", http://www.istoria-artei.ro/resources/files/scia.ap2012%20-%20art.05.pdf
- Gabriel Badea-Päun, "Entre mondanité et mécénat — les avatars d'une relation, Robert de Montesquiou et Antonio de La Gandara", Revue de la Bibliothèque nationale n° 25, 2007, pp. 54–62
- Gabriel Badea-Päun, Antonio de La Gandara (1861–1917), naissance d'un portraitiste mondain. L'exposition chez Durand-Ruel, avril 1893, conférence à la Société de l'histoire de l'art français, présentée à l'Institut national d'histoire de l'art, Paris, le 18 novembre 2006, à paraître
- Gabriel Badea-Päun, "Un intermezzo lithographique — les estampes d'Antonio de La Gandara", Nouvelles de l'estampe, n° 207, juillet-septembre 2006, pp. 23–36.
- Gabriel Badea-Päun, "De l'atelier de Gérôme au cabaret du Chat noir. Les années de formation d'Antonio de La Gandara (1861–1917)", Le Vieux Montmartre, nouvelle série, fascicule n° 75, octobre 2005, pp. 12–36.
- Gabriel Badea-Päun, Antonio de La Gandara, Allgemeines Künstlerlexikon, Leipzig-Munich, K.G.Saur Verlag, vol. 49
- Gabriel Badea-Päun, "Antonio de La Gandara", La Tribune de l'art.
- Gabriel Badea-Päun, Portraits de Société, Paris, Citadelles et Mazenod, 2007. Prix du cercle Montherlant de l'Académie des Beaux-Arts, 2008.
- Gabriel Badea-Päun, The Society Portrait, Thames & Hudson, London and Vendôme Press, New York, 2007
- Gabriel Badea-Päun: Antonio de La Gandara, sa vie, son œuvre (1861–1917), catalogue raisonné de l'œuvre peint et dessiné, thèse de doctorat sous la direction du M. le professeur Bruno Foucart, Paris-IV Sorbonne, 2005, 3 volumes, 881 pages.
