= Margaret Jourdain =

English writer

- Born: 15 August 1876; Ashbourne, Derbyshire
- Died: 6 April 1951 (aged 74)
- Education: University of Oxford
- Occupations: writer on furniture and decoration
- Partner: Ivy Compton-Burnett
- Relatives: Eleanor Jourdain (sister), Francis Charles Robert Jourdain (brother), Philip Jourdain (brother), Charles Clay (grandfather)
- Writing career
- Pen name: Francis Lenygon
- Notable work: Regency Furniture (1931)

Margaret Jourdain (15 August 1876 – 6 April 1951) was an English writer on furniture and decoration. She began her career ghost-writing as Francis Lenygon for the firm of Lenygon & Morant.

== Early life ==
Born in Ashbourne, Derbyshire, on 15 August 1876, Jourdain's father was Francis Jourdain (1834–1898), a vicar and her mother, Emily Jourdain (née Clay), was the daughter of the surgeon and pioneer of ovariotomy, Charles Clay. One of ten children, her siblings included the writer and academic Eleanor Jourdain, the ornithologist Francis Charles Robert Jourdain and the mathematician Philip Jourdain.

Jourdain attended the University of Oxford where she studied classics obtaining a third-class degree. While there she met actress Janette Ranken and the pair moved to London, where they lived together. The relationship came to an end when Ranken married Ernest Thesiger in 1917.

== Career ==
Jourdain began her career ghost-writing as Francis Lenygon for the firm of Lenygon & Morant. dealers in furnishings with a royal appointment, who were also the fabricators of carefully crafted reproductions, especially of Kentian furnishings, some of which have been displayed in public collections for decades.

The finely honed writing that distinguishes Jourdain's work must be partly credited to careful pre-editing by her lifelong friend and domestic partner, the novelist Ivy Compton-Burnett. The couple lived together from 1918 until Jourdain's death in 1951. Members of their circle speculated on whether they were lovers: Compton-Burnett referred to herself and Jourdain as "neutrals". Jourdain's papers are archived at the Victoria and Albert Museum, London, but some of her unpublished translations of poems by Jose Maria de Heredia, Pontus de Tyard and Gérard de Nerval are among Compton-Burnett's papers at King's College, Cambridge.

Jourdain's Regency Furniture (1931) covered new ground in extending the "classic" period of English furniture design forward to 1830. With Ralph Edwards, Keeper of Furniture and Woodwork at the Victoria and Albert Museum, she co-wrote Georgian Cabinet-Makers (1944, 1951), a series of biographies of the major furniture-makers of England from the Restoration of Charles II to 1800. Their studies were based on archival work, which had not been a strong feature of previous connoisseurship. As revised by Edwards, their biographies remained standard works until they were superseded by the work of Peter Ward-Jackson, Christopher Gilbert, Helena Hayward, and members of the Furniture History Society.

== Major works ==
Most of Margaret Jourdain's works went through several printings.

- Old Lace: A Handbook for Collectors: An Account of the Different Styles of Lace, Their History, Characteristics & Manufacture (B.T. Batsford (London) & Charles Scribners Sons (New York) 1909)
- English Interior Decoration and Furniture of the Later XVIIIth century 1760-1820: An Account of Its Development and Characteristic Forms 1922; 1924. (B.T. Batsford)
- English Decorative Plasterwork of the Renaissance 1926; 1933 (B.T. Batsford)
- Regency Furniture, 1795–1820 1931 (1934?); revised and extended to 1830 by Ralph Fastnedge
- Georgian Cabinet-Makers 1944; 1946; revised 1951 (3rd edition 1955) (with Ralph Edwards)
- The Work of William Kent. Artist, Painter, Designer and Landscape Gardener (Country Life Books 1948): the first modern reassessment of William Kent, with an introduction by Christopher Hussey
- Jourdain, Margaret; Jenyns, Soame (1967), Chinese Export Art in the Eighteenth Century (2 ed.), Spring Books (First edition appeared in 1950)
- English Interior Decoration, 1500 to 1830: A Study in the Development of Design (B.T. Batsford 1950)
- English Furniture (Country Life Books 1950)
