= Charlotte Anne Moberly =

English academic (1846–1937)

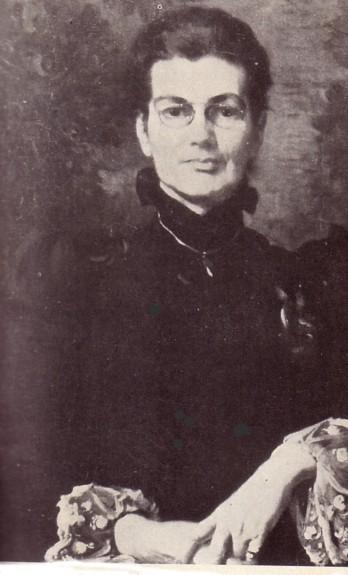
- Born: Charlotte Anne Elizabeth Moberly; 16 September 1846; Winchester, Hampshire
- Died: 6 May 1937 (aged 90); Oxford, Oxfordshire
- Parent: George Moberly (father)
- Relatives: Robert Moberly, George Herbert Moberly, John Cornelius Moberly (brothers)
- Writing career
- Notable work: An Adventure (1911)

Principal of St Hugh's College, Oxford
- In office 1886-1915
- Deputy: Eleanor Jourdain
- Preceded by: position established
- Succeeded by: Eleanor Jourdain

Charlotte Anne Elizabeth Moberly (1846–1937) was an English academic, and first Principal of St Hugh's College, Oxford. Her claimed time-travel book An Adventure, written in 1911 with fellow academic Eleanor Jourdain, became a bestseller.

== Family ==
Born in Winchester on 16 September 1846, Moberly was the tenth child in a family of 15. Her father was George Moberly and her mother was Mary Anne (1812–1890). One of her brothers was Robert Moberly, the first Principal of St Stephen's House, Oxford. Tutored at home by a private teacher and her mother, she also gained basic skills in Hebrew, Latin and Greek. She participated at length in discussions about the Oxford Movement with John Keble, who had baptised her and whose wife was her god-mother.

== Career ==
In 1869, Moberly undertook secretarial duties for her father who had been appointed as Bishop of Salisbury. She continued in this capacity, with the additional duties of nursing him when his health deteriorated, until he died in 1885.

Elizabeth Wordsworth established St. Hugh's Hall in 1886 and Moberly was appointed as Principal, where she served until her retirement in 1915. In 1911, under Moberly's leadership, St Hugh's Hall became St Hugh's College, Oxford. She remained a member of the governing council of the college until her death and was an honorary fellow.

== Works ==
In addition to the collaborative work with Eleanor Jourdain, An Adventure, published under the pseudonyms Elizabeth Morison and Frances Lamont, in which they claimed to have seen the gardens of the Palace of Versailles as they had been in the late eighteenth century, and ghosts of Marie Antoinette and others, Moberly published several other works. An Adventure is a classic ghost story based on a joint experience they had at Versailles and became a best-seller which was reprinted in editions in 1913, 1924, 1931, 1955, and 1988. Other works include:

- Moberly, C. A. E. (1911). Dulce domum : George Moberly (D.C.L., headmaster of Winchester College, 1835-1866, Bishop of Salisbury, 1869-1885), his family and friends. London: J. Murray.
- Moberly, Charlotte Anne Elizabeth (1916). The Faith of the Prophets. London: J. Murray.
- Moberly, C. A. E. (1917). On Prayer for Special Occasions. London: S.P.C.K.
- Moberly, Charlotte Anne Elizabeth (1939). Five Visions of the Revelation. London: A.R. Mowbray & Company.
- Moberly, Charlotte Anne (1989). Ghosts of the Trianon: The Complete "an Adventure". Borgo Pr. ISBN 0-8095-7105-6.
