= Philip Jourdain =

British logician

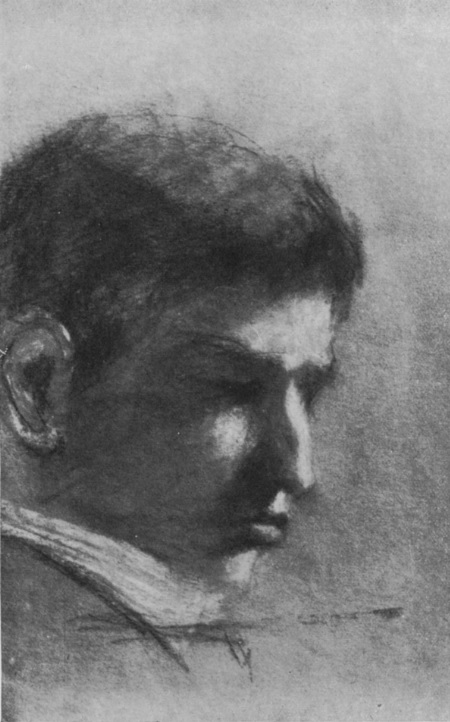
- Drawing by his sister Millicent (1909)
- Born: 16 October 1879; Ashbourne, Derbyshire
- Died: 1 October 1919 (aged 39); Crookham, Hampshire
- Occupation(s): Editor and mathematician
- Spouse: Laura Jourdain
- Parent(s): Emily Clay and Francis Jourdain
- Relatives: Charles Clay (Grandfather)

Philip Edward Bertrand Jourdain (16 October 1879 – 1 October 1919) was a British mathematician, logician and follower of Bertrand Russell.

== Background ==
He was born in Ashbourne in Derbyshire one of a large family belonging to Emily Clay and his father Francis Jourdain (who was the vicar at Ashbourne). His sister Eleanor Jourdain was an English academic and author. Another sister, Margaret (1876–1951), was an authority on the history of fine English home-furnishings, and the life-long companion of the novelist Ivy Compton-Burnett.

== Mathematics and logic ==
Jourdain was partly disabled by Friedreich's ataxia. He corresponded with Georg Cantor and Gottlob Frege, and took a close interest in the paradoxes related to Russell's paradox, formulating the card paradox version of the liar paradox. He corresponded with Ludwig Wittgenstein, meeting with him in Cambridge to discuss Frege's book Grundgesetze der Arithmetik, parts of which Jourdain had prepared a translation. He also worked on algebraic logic, and the history of science with Isaac Newton as a particular study. He was London editor for The Monist.

Near the end of his life Jourdain became increasingly obsessed by trying to prove the axiom of choice, and published several incorrect proofs of it. Littlewood (1986, p.129) describes Jourdain on his deathbed still arguing with him about his (incorrect) proof of the axiom of choice. Later, the independence of the axiom of choice was established.

== Works ==
The following works of Philip Jourdain are available from Internet Archive:

- 1908: Some Points in the Foundation of Mathematical Physics in The Monist v 18
- 1911: Some Modern Advances in Logic in The Monist v 21
- 1913: The Nature of Mathematics
- 1913: The Nature and Validity of the Principle of Least Action in The Monist v 23
- 1914: The Economy of Thought in The Monist v 24
- 1918: The Philosophy of B*rtr*nd R*ss*ll with an appendix of leading passages from certain other works
- 1919: Indefinables and Indemonstrables in Mathematics and Theology in The Monist v 29

Jordain acted as editor for

- 1914: Augustus De Morgan: Essays on the Life and Work of Newton

Jourdain made the following translations:

- 1911: Ernst Mach History and Root of the Principle of Conservation of Energy
- 1915: Ernst Mach The Science of Mechanics
- 1915: Georg Cantor Contributions to the Foundation of the Theory of Transfinite Numbers
