= Amable Jourdain =

French historian and orientalist

- Born: Amable Louis Marie Michel Bréchillet Jourdain; 25 January 1788; Paris
- Died: 19 February 1818 (aged 30)
- Occupations: Historian; Orientalist
- Spouse: Marie-Philotime Rougeot

Amable Jourdain (25 January 1788, Paris – 19 February 1818) was an early 19th-century French historian and orientalist, a student of Louis-Mathieu Langlès and Antoine-Isaac Silvestre de Sacy, a specialist of ancient Persia and the Latin transmission of Aristotle.

== Work ==
His most importants works are La Perse ou Tableau de gouvernement, de la religion et de la littérature de cet Empire, published in 1814, and Recherches critiques sur l'âge et l'origine des traductions latines d'Aristote, et sur des commentaires grecs ou arabes employés par les docteurs scholastiques, published post mortem in 1819 and reprinted in 1843.

In this second work, based on a series of questions posed by the Académie des Inscriptions et Belles-Lettres on the influence exercised by the Arabic philosophers on Western scholasticism, Jourdain tries to answer rigorously by examining the preserved texts and manuscripts to the following three questions: "Do we owe the Arabs the first knowledge of some works of the ancient Greek philosophers and of Aristotle in particular? At what time, and by what means, did this communication take place for the first time? Has it brought any modification to scholastic philosophy?". Indeed, since the 18th, very different opinions, not supported by a thorough examination according to Jourdain, were expressed on the introduction of the texts of Aristotle in medieval Christian West, its date and its Byzantine or Arabic origin: On the one hand for example, the Italian Ludovico Antonio Muratori had defended the idea of an early and exclusively Byzantine branch (Non ergo ex Arabum penu [...], sed e Græcia), while the Spaniard of Lebanese origin Miguel Casiri maintained that the direct translations of Greek had been very late ([...] adeo ut hac Arabica versione latine reddita, priusquam Aristoteles Græcus repertus esset, divus Thomas ceterique scholastici usi fuerint).

The conclusions of the Jourdain inquiry were as follows: until the beginning of the 13th, the texts of Aristotle (apart from the Logica vetus, that is to say the translation of three or four Treatises on logic by Boethius), were neither widespread nor used in the Christian West, nor were those of the Aristotelian Arabic philosophers Avicenna, Averroes). In 1274 (the year of the death of Thomas Aquinas), all Aristotle's work was known and used in the universities of Paris, Oxford, etc.; It entered them massively from the years 1220–25, and by both Arab and Byzantine ways (according to the texts). The translations made directly from the Greek progressively replaced, as they were available, those which had passed through Arabic. As pertains the influence of Arab Aristotelianism on western Christian scholasticism, he concluded that it was of the order of the given example and of the emulation created, urging the Latins to systematically seek the original version of the texts.

One of the contributions of Jourdain's book was to introduce the expression "college of the translators of Toledo", which then flourished to designate the translations from Arabic to Latin In Spain in the middle of the 12th. However, this expression, by its too formal character, is no longer suitable to recent historians.

It was the work of Jourdain to enumerate the Latin texts and commentaries used by the scholastics and to determine from which sources (Arabic or directly Greek) they were derived. In 1817 he won the prize of the Royal Academy of Inscriptions and Belles-Lettres. Jourdain was a member of the Institut de France and assistant secretary of the Royal School of Oriental Languages (post created for him).

== Private life ==
Amable Jourdain was married to Marie-Philotime Rougeot (1795–1862), who is buried at Montmartre Cemetery. In the tomb also, is the father of Marie-Philotime Rougeot, Antoine Rougeot (1762–1841), former first-class surgeon of military hospitals, Charles Bréchillet-Jourdain (1817–1886), a charitable doctor in the fifth arrondissement of Paris, the son of Amable Jourdain and Philotime Rougeot, member of the institute, philosopher and writer, Inspector General for Higher Education, Secretary General of the Ministry of Education (Minister Félix Esquirou de Parieu) husband of Elizabeth Meunier, (1825–1868), who also rests in the tomb, which is to be found in the 21st division, avenue Cordier.

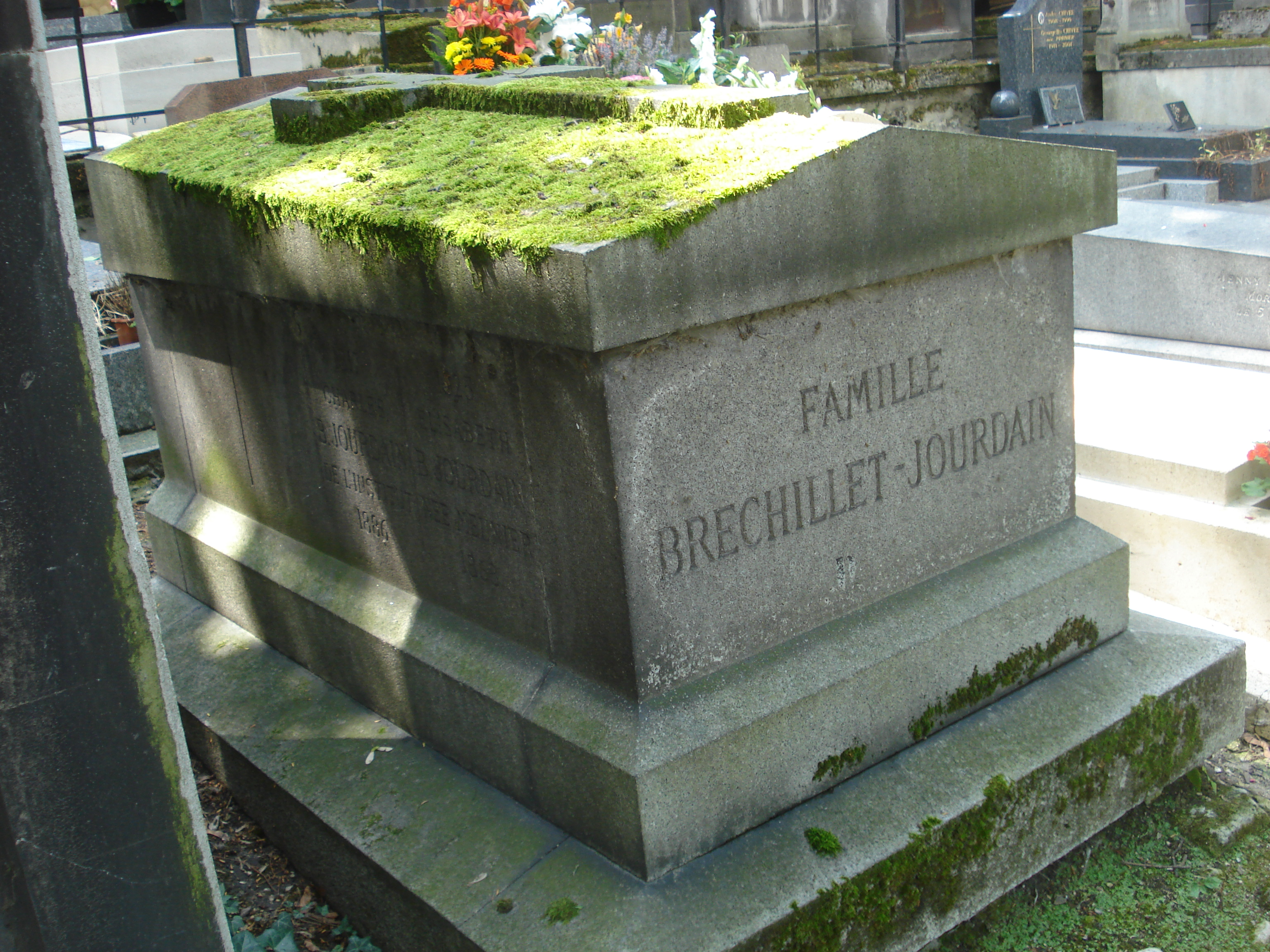
Chales Bréchillet Jourdain's grave at Montmartre Cemetery

== Publications ==
- 1810. Mémoire sur l'observatoire de Méragah et sur quelques instrumens employés pour y observer
- 1812. Notice de l'histoire universelle de Mirkhond, intitulée "le Jardin de la pureté"
- 1813. Le jardin de la pureté, contenant l'histoire des prophètes, des rois et des Khalifes, par Mohammed, fels de Khavendschah, connu sous le nom de Mirkhond
- 1814. Lettre à M. Michaud sur une singulière croisade d'enfants
- 1814. La Perse, ou Tableau de l'histoire du gouvernement, de la religion, de la littérature, etc., de cet Empire, en cinq volumes
- 1819. Recherches critiques sur l'âge et l'origine des traductions latines d'Aristote, et sur des commentaires grecs ou arabes employés par les docteurs scholastiques (couronné par l'académie royale des inscriptions et belles-lettres), translated in German in 1831
- ????. Notice historique sur Aboul-Féda et ses ouvrages
- 1843. Recherches critiques sur l'́âge et l'origine des traductions latines d'́Aristole, et sur des commentaires grecs ou arabes employés par les docteurs scholastiques, version corrigée par Charles Marie Gabriel Bréchillet Jourdain (1817-1886), son fils
- 1860. De l'origine des traditions sur le christianisme de Boèce

== Bibliography ==
- (in Spanish) Marietta Gargatagli, La historia de la escuela de traductores de Toledo, in Quaderns Revista de Traducció, vol. IV (1999), pp. 9–13
- (in Spanish) Julio César Santoyo, La "escuela de traductores" de Íñigo López de Mendoza, marqués de Santillana a Etica y política de la traducción literaria, Miguel Gómez Ediciones, 2004. ISBN 9788488326232.
