= Eleanor Jourdain =

Principal of St Hugh's College, Oxford

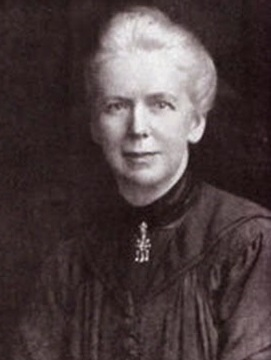
- Born: Eleanor Frances Jourdain; 16 November 1863; Ashbourne, Derbyshire
- Died: 6 April 1924 (aged 60); Oxford, Oxfordshire
- Resting place: Wolvercote Cemetery, Oxford
- Education: Lady Margaret Hall, Oxford; University of Paris
- Occupations: Teacher; academic; author
- Known for: The Moberly–Jourdain incident
- Relatives: Philip Jourdain (brother); Charles Clay (maternal grandfather)

Principal of St Hugh's College, Oxford
- In office 1915–1924
- Preceded by: Charlotte Anne Moberly
- Succeeded by: Barbara Gwyer

Eleanor Frances Jourdain (16 November 1863 – 6 April 1924) was an English academic, Principal of St Hugh's College, Oxford, 1915 to 1924. She died of a sudden heart attack after being forced to resign her post.

Jourdain rose to fame for claiming that she and fellow-teacher Charlotte Anne Moberly had slipped back in time to the period of the French Revolution while on a trip to Versailles, known as the Moberly–Jourdain incident.

== Family and early life ==
Born in Ashbourne, Derbyshire on 16 November 1863, Jourdain's father was Francis Jourdain (1834–1898), a vicar and her mother, Emily, was the daughter of Charles Clay. Jourdain was the first of ten children. There were at least two sisters: Charlotte, who had been one of St Hugh's College's first four students, and Margaret, a writer on English furniture and decoration. Her brother Philip Jourdain was a prolific editor for The Monist.

Jourdain attended a private day school in Manchester, and later, in 1883, studied at Lady Margaret Hall, Oxford. In 1886, she defended her thesis becoming the first woman to undergo a viva in the school of modern history.

== Career ==
She began her career as secretary to Minnie Benson, the wife of the Archbishop of Canterbury. Then she advanced to assistant mistress at Tottenham High School and later to Clifton High School. In 1892, she and M. A. Woods, co-founded Corran Collegiate School in Watford, as private boarding- and day school for girls. By 1900, the school had 100 pupils, and Jourdain had become the Headmistress. Jourdain left in 1903 and moved to Paris and spent a year studying the symbolism in Dante's Divine Comedy. She published articles in both French and English on her research and was awarded a doctorate in 1904 from the University of Paris based on her research. She was then invited by another Oxford alumna, Charlotte Anne Elizabeth Moberly, who was acting principal of St Hugh's Hall to come to St Hugh's as vice principal.

In 1905, she began tutoring French at St Hugh's and serving as vice principal. Beginning at around 1908, she was a leader in the suffrage movement for St Hugh's, often attending demonstrations in London in her doctoral robes. She also continued to publish and presented such works as 'Methods of moral instruction and training of girls in France' in Moral Instruction and Training in Schools, edited by M. E. Sadler (1908, 2.85–112); On the Theory of the Infinite in Modern Thought (1911), An Introduction to the French Classical Drama (1912). In April 1915, she replaced Moberly as principal at St. Hugh's and during World War I accepted a position to work as a translator for the government. Beginning in 1920, she lectured in French at Oxford, becoming one of the first women to hold university lectures. In 1922, she became the first woman to conduct undergraduate examinations.

Jourdain was chiefly famous for claiming that she and Moberly had slipped back in time to the period of the French Revolution while on a trip to Versailles, known as the Moberly–Jourdain incident. Their book was published pseudonymously; their identity was not revealed until the mid-1920s, after Jourdain's death. The book was a best seller but the claims drew a sceptical response by many.

Jourdain was an autocratic leader and in November 1923, she persuaded the college council to fire a tutor, Cecilia Mary Ady, who, she thought, was challenging her authority. Ady protested her wrongful termination causing all the tutors and several council members to resign, as well as resulting in boycotts by tutors at other Oxford affiliated schools. The ensuing situation was widely reported in the press and an investigation, initially welcomed by Jourdain, was undertaken. When it became evident that she would be asked to resign, Jourdain suffered a heart attack and died on 6 April 1924, aged 60. She was buried in Wolvercote Cemetery, Oxford.

== Literature ==
- Jourdain, Eleanor F. (1894). The symbolism of the Divina commedia. New York: Christian literature. OCLC 63968311.
- Jourdain, Eleanor F. (1895). Dante's use of the divine name in the "Divina commedia". New York: Christian literature. OCLC 63968310.
- Jourdain, Eleanor F. (1895). The women of the "Divina commedia". New York: Christian literature. OCLC 63968312.
- Jourdain, Eleanor F. (1902). A study in the symbolism of the "Divina commedia". Shaldon, South Devon: E.E. Speight. OCLC 10790778.
- Jourdain, Eleanor F. (1904). Le symbolisme dans la Divine comédie de Dante (Thesis) (in French). Paris: A. Picard & fils. OCLC 568729094.
- Jourdain, Eleanor F. (1911). On the theory of the infinite in modern thought: two introductory studies. London: Longmans, Green and Co. OCLC 614390123.
- An Adventure [at the Petit Trianon. Signed Elizabeth Morison, Frances Lamont]. / [by Moberly, Charlotte Anne Elizabeth]. London, 1911. The later editions were published by Faber, including one edited by Joan Evans, 1955
- Jourdain, Eleanor F. (1912). An introduction to the French classical drama. Oxford: Clarendon Press. OCLC 551365149.
- Jourdain, Eleanor F. (1914). "La Journée des Dupes". The Modern Language Review. 9 (4): 516–517. doi:10.2307/3713636. JSTOR 3713636.
- Jourdain, Eleanor F. (1921). Dramatic theory and practice in France 1690-1808. London: Longmans, Green.
- Jourdain, Eleanor Frances (1924). The drama in Europe in theory and practice. London: Methuen & Co., ltd.
- Jourdain, Eleanor (1989). Ghosts of the Trianon: the complete "An Adventure". Borgo Pr. ISBN 0-8095-7105-6.
