= Moberly =

- Pronunciation: Moberly

Origin
- Meaning: a fortified clearing in a forest where assemblies are held
- Region of origin: Old English

Moberly is a surname. Notable people with the surname include:

- Charles Moberly (1907–1996), English cricketer
- Charles Frederic Moberly Bell (1847–1911), British editor of The Times
- Elizabeth Moberly, British writer about homosexuality
- George Moberly (1803–1885), English divine
- Charlotte Anne Moberly (1846–1937), English academic and (alleged) time traveller
- George Herbert Moberly (1837–1895), English priest, academic, and author
- Harry Moberly, American politician from Kentucky
- Henry Edward Moberly (1822–1907), English amateur cricketer, school housemaster and Anglican priest
- Jennifer Moberly (née McClure, born in 1962), American cleric and theologian based at Durham University, England
- Henry John Moberly (also known as "Harry" or "Harvey") (1835–1931), Canadian fur trader with the Hudson's Bay Company
- Capt. John Moberly (1789–1848), British naval officer stationed at Penetanguishene, Ontario
- John Moberly (cricketer) (1848–1928), English cricketer
- Mariquita Jenny Moberly (1855–1937), English artist
- Mary Moberly (1853–1940), British educator
- Patricia Moberly (née Coney, 1938–2016), British public servant, Labour politician, activist, and teacher
- Patrick Moberly (1928–2024), British diplomat
- Robert Campbell Moberly (1845–1903), English theologian
- Robert Hamilton Moberly (1884 –1978) British theologian
- R. W. L. Moberly (born 1952), British theologian
- Tracey Moberly (born 1964), Welsh artist, author, activist
- Walter Moberly (engineer) (1832–1915), English-Canadian engineer
- Walter Hamilton Moberly (1881–1974), British academic
- William Moberly (1850–1914), English cricket and rugby player
- Winifred Moberly (1875–1928), former principal of St Hilda's College, Oxford
