= Arthur Hamilton Moberly =

British architect (1886-1952)

Arthur Hamilton Moberly FRIBA
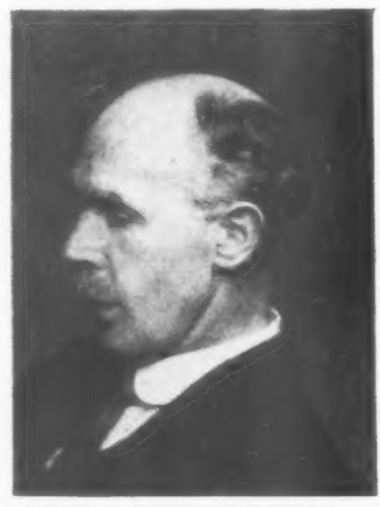
- Born: 1 January 1886; Great Budworth, Cheshire, U.K.
- Died: 1 March 1952 (aged 66); Ashford, Kent, U.K.
- Education: Winchester College; King's College, Cambridge; Architectural Association School of Architecture
- Occupation: Architect
- Spouse: Caroline Barbara MacLehose (m. 1918)
- Children: 3
- Father: Robert Campbell Moberly
- Practice: Slater, Moberly & Uren (formerly Slater & Moberly)
- Buildings: 76 Storey's Way, Cambridge; Peter Jones and Bourne & Hollingsworth department stores, London; Saint Katharine's College, Liverpool
- Military career
- Allegiance: United Kingdom
- Branch: British Army
- Service years: 1914–1918
- Rank: Captain
- Commands: 1st Surrey Rifles
- Conflicts: World War I; Battle of Festubert

Arthur Hamilton Moberly FRIBA (1 January 1886 – 1 March 1952) was a British architect and co-founder of the practice Slater & Moberly (later Slater, Moberly & Uren). Many of the buildings whose design he contributed to are now listed by Historic England.

== Early life and education ==
Moberly was born on 1 January 1886 in Great Budworth, Cheshire. He was the third son and child of 5 children born to Alice Sidney (née Hamilton) and Rev Robert Campbell Moberly, who was the Vicar of Great Budworth at the time. His siblings included Sir Walter Moberly, who would become principal of University College of the South West and later Vice-chancellor of University of Manchester, and Robert Hamilton Moberly, who would later be Bishop of Stepney and Dean of Salisbury. Both of his grandfathers, George Moberly and Walter Kerr Hamilton, had been Bishop of Salisbury. He was a first cousin of the artist Sylvia Holland, daughter of his uncle Edward Hugh Moberly.

Moberly followed his family tradition of attending Winchester College before matriculating at King's College, Cambridge in 1903 for a first degree in engineering, with Professor Charles Inglis as one of his lecturers.

== Career ==
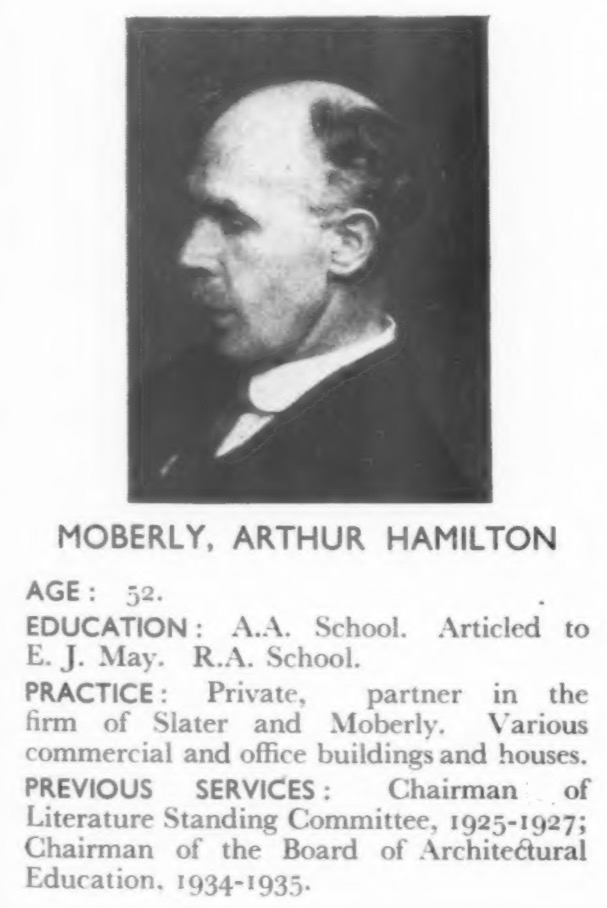
Profile of Arthur Hamilton Moberly printed in the Architects' Journal (2 June 1938)

=== Architectural training and early career ===
Following his first degree at Cambridge, Moberly trained in architecture at the AA School from 1906 to 1908. He went on to study at the Royal Academy Schools from 1908 to 1910 and was articled to E. J. May during the same period. He qualified as an architect in 1909 and was elected Associate of the Royal Institute of British Architects the following year. It was also in 1910 that he started a small private practice in London, where he was based for the next 4 years.

During this period, Moberly designed the Neo-Georgian house at number 7, Linton Road, Oxford, which was built in 1910. It had been originally intended for Moberly's mother, Alice Sidney Moberly, though she reportedly never took residence due to the house being too small. Nevertheless, the house was Grade II listed by Historic England in 2008, commended for delivering "great dignity on a very compact scale within". 7 Linton Road was also featured in art historian Nikolaus Pevsner's Architectural Guide for Oxfordshire (first published in 1974).

Moberly was also the architect behind the house at 76 Storey's Way, Cambridge, built in 1913. The house was designed as residence for Professor Sir John Harold Clapham, before being bought by Olympic gold medallist turned medical doctor Edward Vaughan Bevan. The property received Grade II listed status in 1996, not only due to the historical interests but also the merits of Moberly's design. 76 Storey's Way was one of two buildings designed by Moberly mentioned in Pevsner's Architectural Guide for Cambridgeshire (the other being 6, Millington Road). 76 Storey's Way is currently a hall of residence for postgraduate students at Churchill College, Cambridge.

Moberly was commissioned to work on the extension to Gunfield, at 19 Norham Gardens, Oxford. Specifically, he designed the linkage way between the main house (originally built in 1877) and a chapel that had been added in 1909. Moberly was also behind the design of the porch and loggia added to the main house. This work was completed in 1915 and since then, the house has undergone refurbishments and extensions designed by other architects. Gunfield received Grade II designation in 1992.

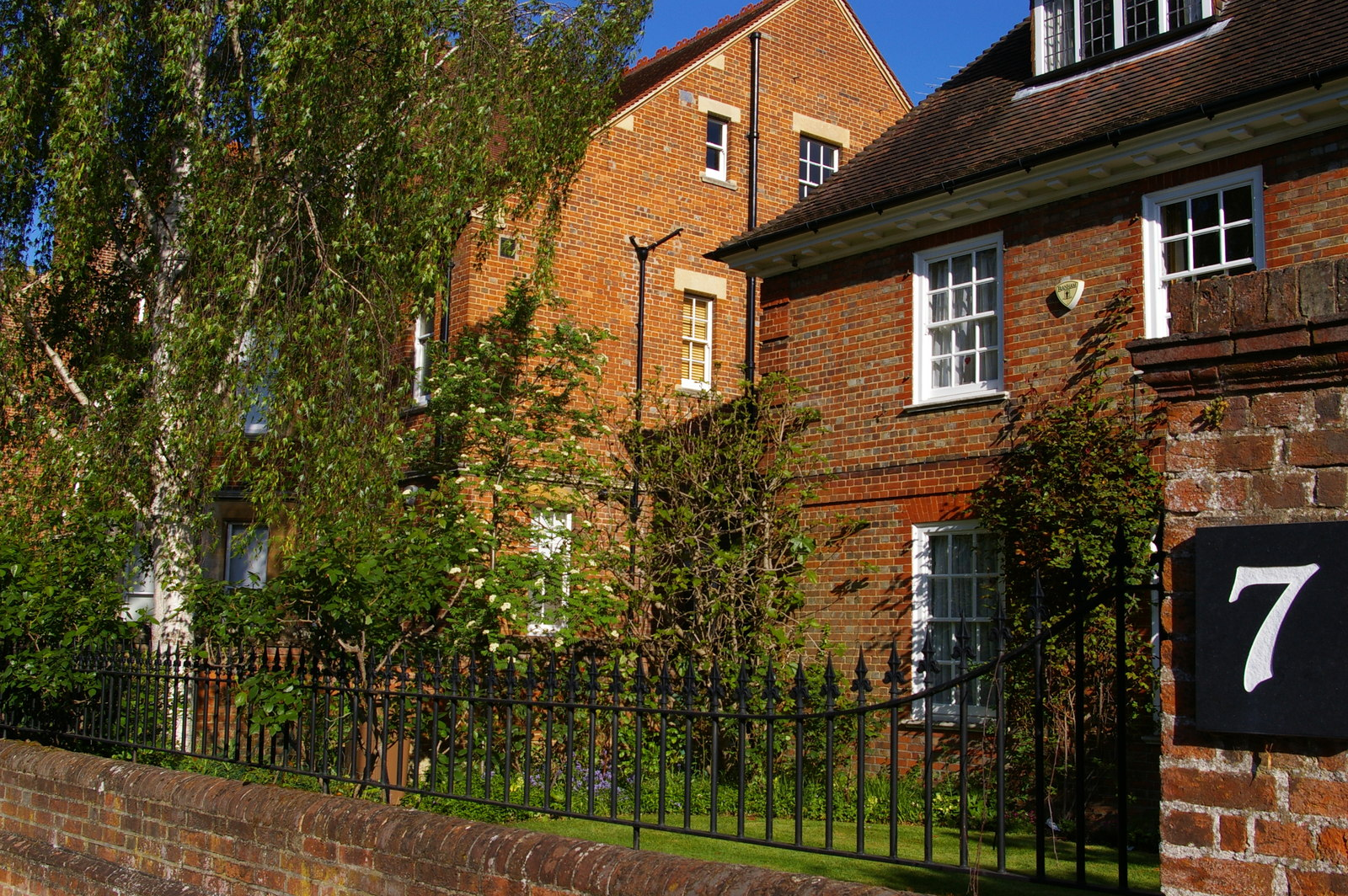
7 Linton Road, Oxford, built in 1910.

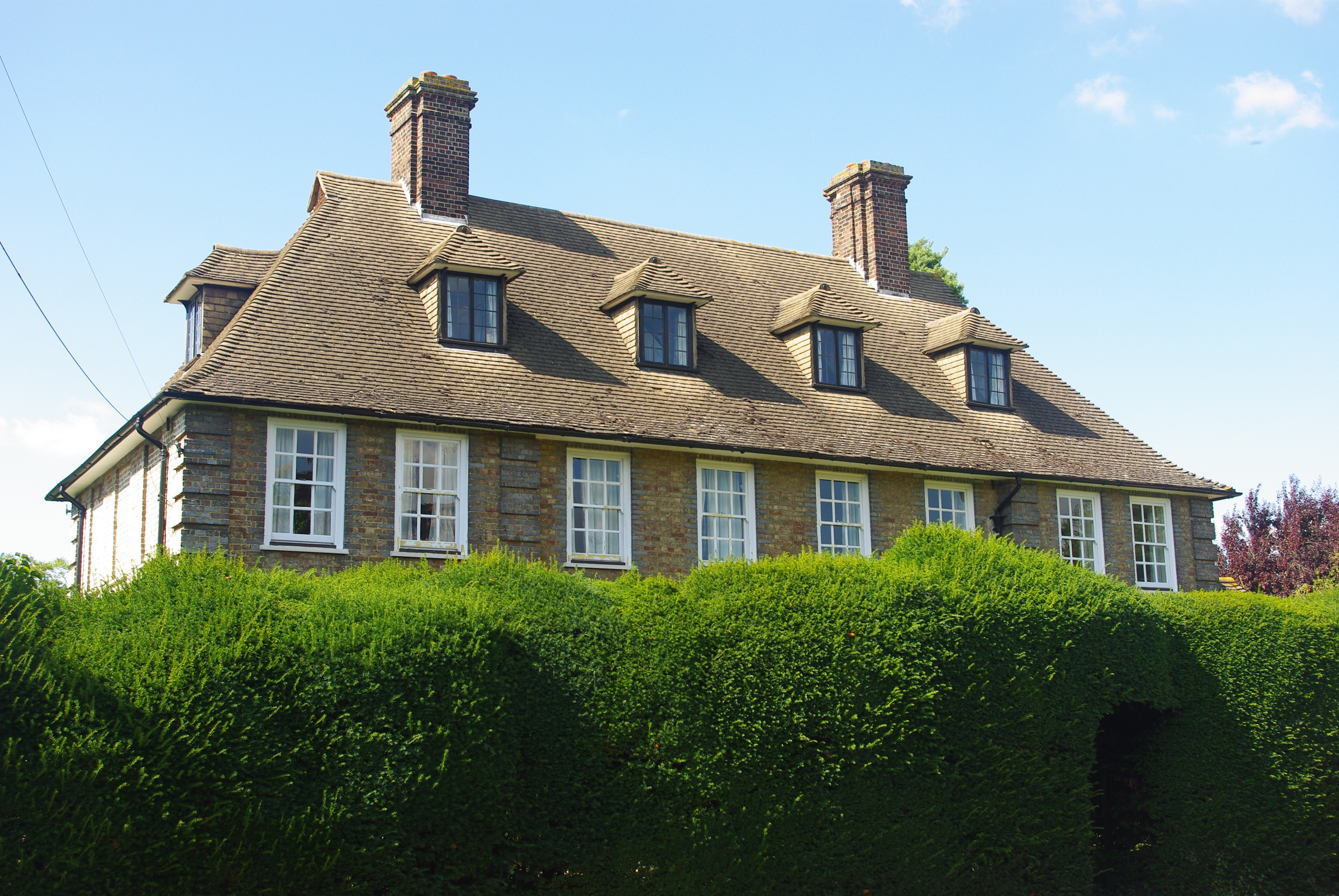
76 Storey's Way, Cambridge, built in 1913.

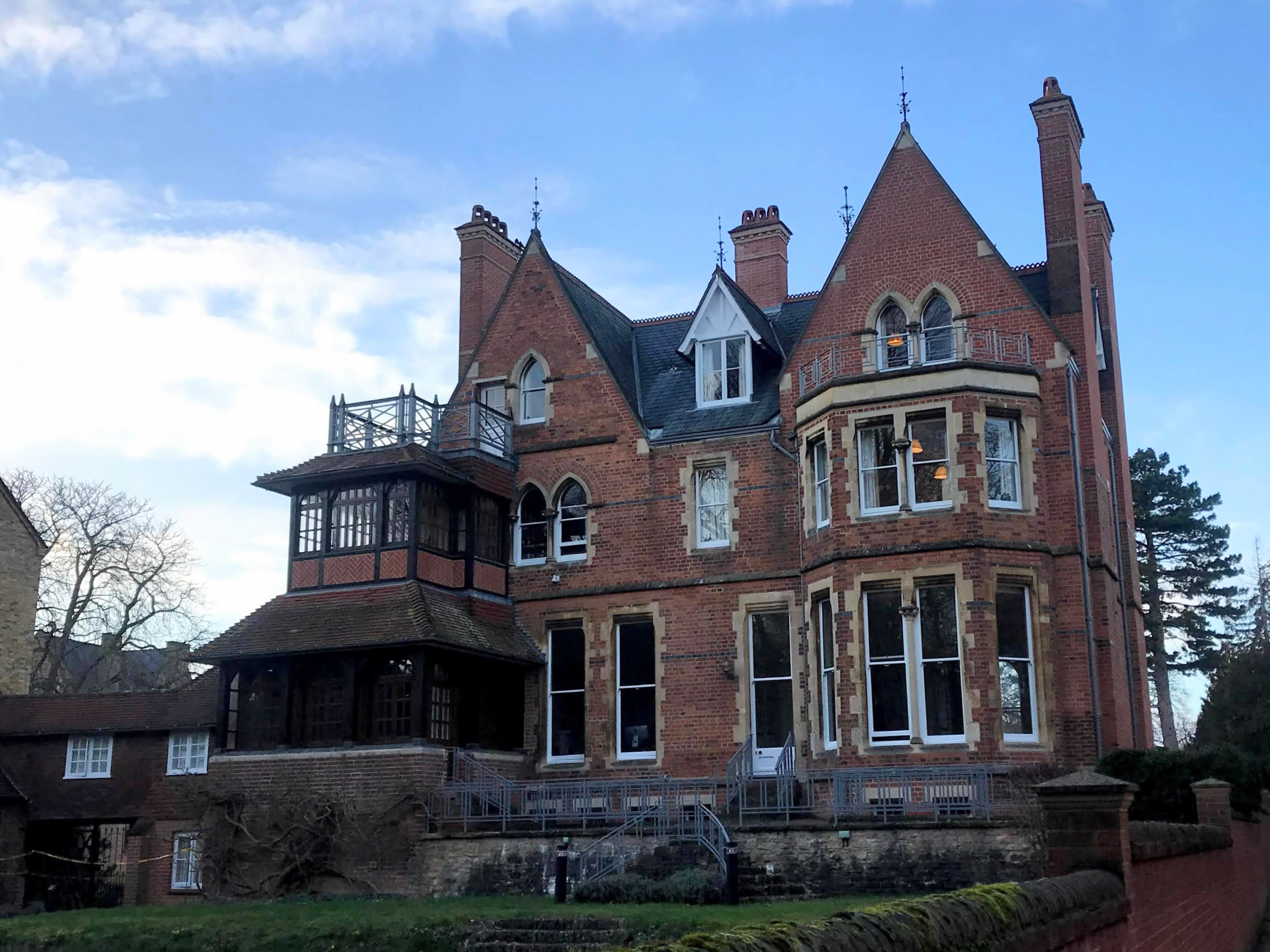
Rear view of Gunfield, at 19 Norham Gardens, Oxford. The porch and loggia, added in 1915, were designed by Moberly.

=== Military service ===
During World War I, Moberly served in the British Army with the 1st Surrey Rifles, where he was a captain. He was posted to France and took part in the Battle of Festubert in 1915. He was severely wounded in battle and permanently lost the use of his right hand as a result.

=== Slater, Moberly & Uren ===
Moberly returned to his private architecture practice following the war. In 1920, he was elected as Fellow of the Royal Institute of British Architects. In 1923, he co-founded the Slater & Moberly partnership, a London-based practice, with his friend John Alan Slater, who he had met at the AA School. The business was joined by Reginald Uren in 1936, subsequently renamed as Slater, Moberly & Uren. Together, the company worked on the designs of many major department stores in London, notably remodelling of the Bourne & Hollingsworth department store on Oxford Street (built 1925-1927), the Peter Jones & Partners store in Sloane Square (designed from 1932 and built 1935-1937), and the John Lewis store by Cavendish Square (constructed in 1939).

During this period, Moberly was given the sole credit for the design of Warrington Training College (later renamed Saint Katharine's College and now part of Liverpool Hope University campus), which was opened in 1930. The building was designated Grade II in 2013, dubbed "a very good example of early-mid 20th century architecture", commended for the "accomplished Vernacular Revival styling". Moberly was also credited with the extensions to the National Hospital for Nervous Diseases at Queen Square, London (now known as the National Hospital for Neurology and Neurosurgery). This work included the creation of surgical facilities as well as teaching and laboratory spaces. The new hospital wing was opened in 1938 by Queen Mary, after whom the wing was named.

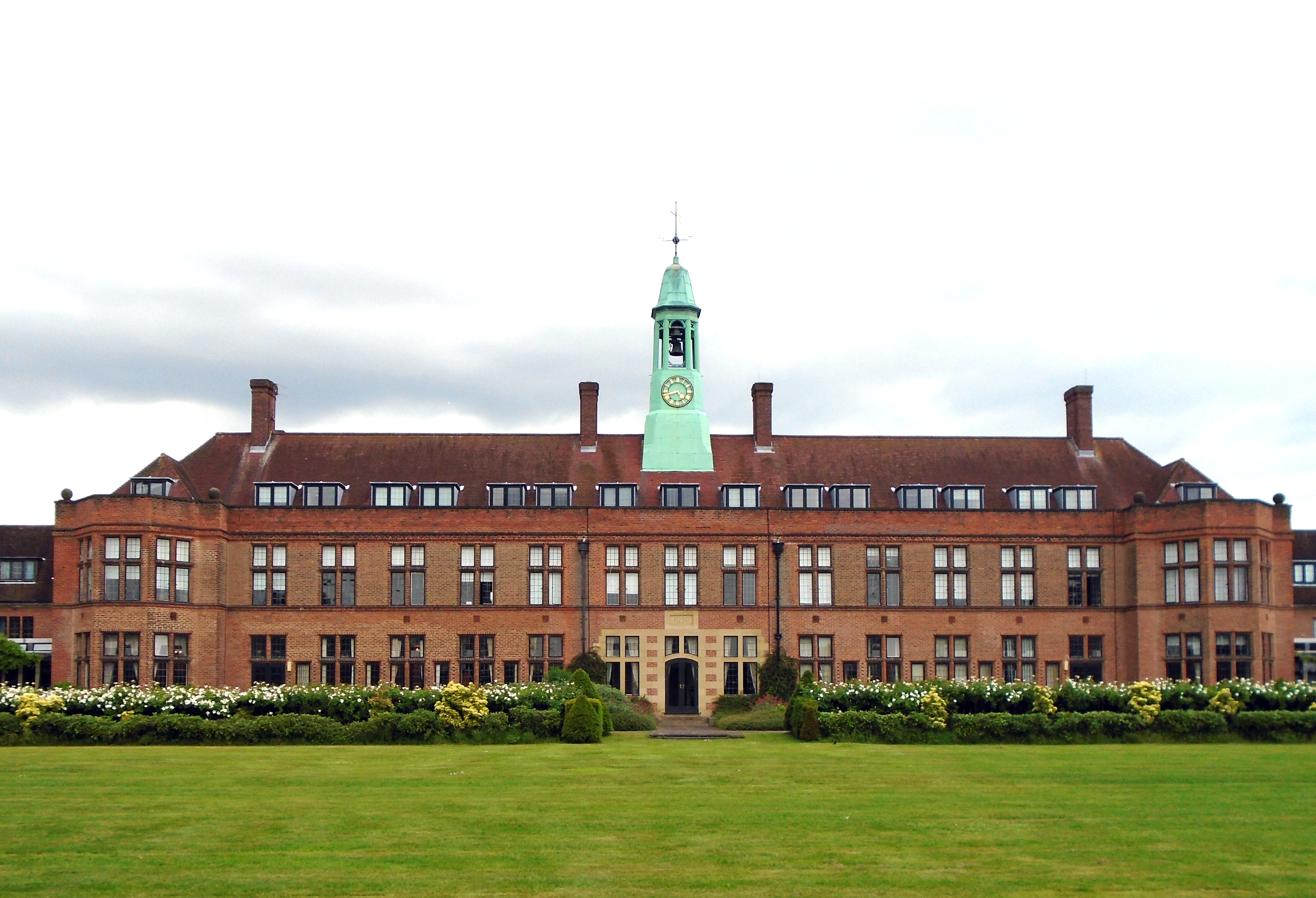
Saint Katharine's College, now part of Liverpool Hope University.

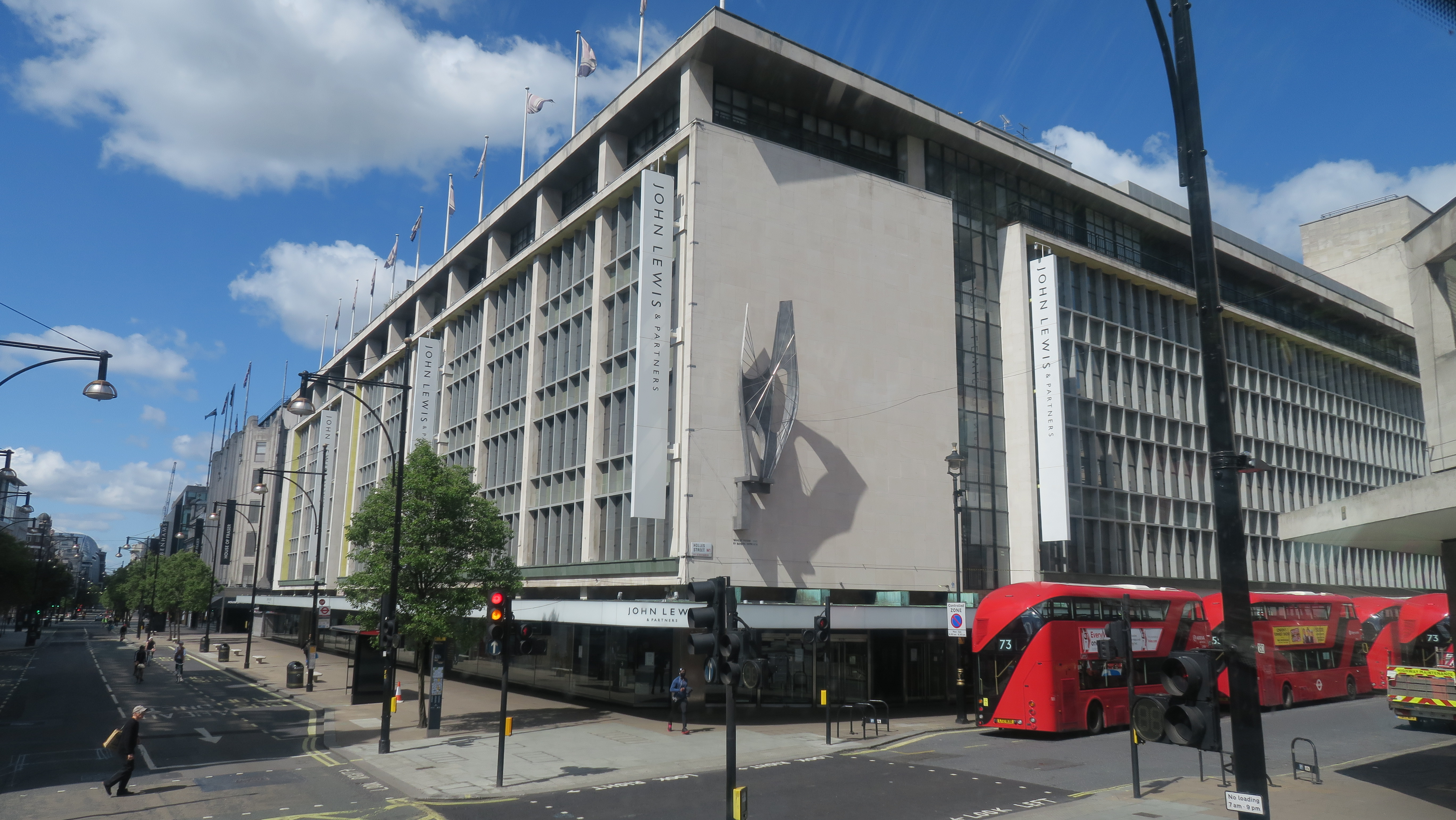
John Lewis department store at Cavendish Square, London.

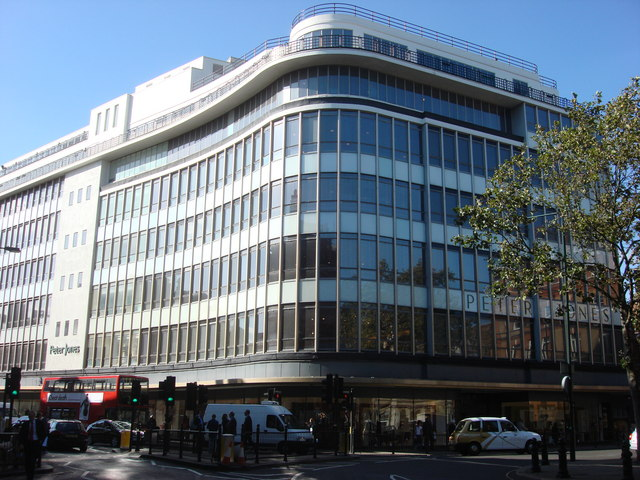
Peter Jones & Partners department store in Sloane Square, London.

=== Other works ===
Moberly held several leadership and committee positions within the Royal Institute of British Architects (RIBA), notably as Chairman of the Literature Standing Committee and the Text and Reference Books Committee, and as a member of the council. He was appointed as one of RIBA's vice-presidents for the 1938-1939 session. He also served as a member of the Board of Architectural Education, whose membership for some years included his eldest brother Walter as a representative of the Committee of Vice-Chancellors and Principals. Moberly was chairman of the board in 1934-35. During this time, he gave an address to students at the RIBA where he urged his audience to keep an open mind and not form an opinion based on "mass-prejudice", which could manifest as "Witch-hunting, Jew-baiting, blood-feuds and war passions". In the same speech, he also highlighted the importance of tradesmen's expertise in the construction industry:

"Obviously, you can never know as much about bricklaying as a bricklayer or about plastering as a plasterer, and if the tradesman is treated as an expert he will give better service than if he is treated as a mere machine for carrying out instructions. Incidentally, there is a risk that your instructions may be bad instructions; and he may know them to be bad."

During the Second World War, Moberly worked for the Ministry of Works and contributed to reports number 18 and 20 in the Post War Building Studies series.

== Personal life ==
Moberly married his wife, Caroline Barbara MacLehouse in 1918. They had 3 daughters.

Moberly was a close friend of the economist Arthur Cecil Pigou, who was a fellow of King's College, Cambridge, Moberly's alma mater. Moberly was acknowledged, among others, in the preface to Pigou's 1908 book, The Problems of Theism, and Other Essays, for giving the author feedback on several of the essays.

Moberly designed his own family's London residence at 26 Southway in Hampstead (c. 1927). In 1948, he and his wife relocated to Ashford, Kent. He died at his home on 1 March 1952.

== See also ==
- Architecture of Liverpool
- Listed buildings in Cambridge (west)
- Linton Road
