= Moberly (disambiguation) =

Moberly is a surname.

Moberly may also refer to:

== Places ==
- Moberly, Indiana
- Moberly, Kentucky
- Moberly, Missouri
- Moberly Lake (disambiguation), multiple locations

== Other uses ==
- USS Moberly (PF-63), World War II frigate
