= Walter Moberly =

Walter Moberly may refer to:

- Walter Moberly (engineer), British-born civil engineer active in Canada
- Walter Hamilton Moberly (1881–1974), British academic and author of Crisis in the University (1949)
- R. W. L. Moberly, British theologian
