= R. W. L. Moberly =

English theologian

The Reverend Walter Moberly

Personal life
- Born: Robert Walter Lambert Moberly; 26 March 1952 (age 74)
- Spouse: Jennifer Moberly
- Children: 2
- Relatives: Elizabeth Moberly (sister); Robert Hamilton Moberly (grandfather); Robert Campbell Moberly (great-grandfather)

Religious life
- Religion: Christianity
- Denomination: Anglicanism
- Church: Church of England
- Ordination: 1981 (deacon); 1982 (priest)

Senior posting
- Based in: Diocese of Durham
- Previous post: Curate at Knowle Parish Church (1981-1985)

Academic background
- Education: Winchester College
- Alma mater: New College, Oxford (MA); Ridley Hall, Cambridge; Selwyn College, Cambridge (MA); Trinity College, Cambridge (PhD)
- Thesis: Principle and practice in the study of biblical narrative: A fresh approach to Exodus 32-34 (1980)
- Doctoral advisor: John A. T. Robinson
- Influences: Brevard S. Childs, Nicholas Lash, Jon D. Levenson, Peter L. Berger

Academic work
- Discipline: Theology
- Institutions: Durham University; Center of Theological Inquiry
- Main interests: Biblical hermeneutics, Biblical Theology, Spirituality
- Notable works: The Bible, Theology, and Faith: A Study of Abraham and Jesus (2000); The Theology of the Book of Genesis (2009); Old Testament Theology: Reading the Hebrew Bible as Christian Scripture (2013)
- Influenced: Brent A. Strawn

President of the Society for Old Testament Study
- In office 2018
- Preceded by: Paul Joyce
- Succeeded by: Susan Gillingham

Robert Walter Lambert Moberly (/ˈmoʊbərli/; born 26 March 1952), known by his middle name Walter, is an English theologian and professor of theology and biblical interpretation at Durham University.

== Early life and ancestry ==
Robert Walter Lambert Moberly is the younger child and only son of Elise Maria Hubertina (née Gitmans, a Dutch national) and Robert Basil Moberly. His father was a civil servant who was also known for his writings on Mozart and operas. He has an elder sister, Elizabeth Rosamund Moberly, born in 1949. The Moberly family had a long tradition of association with the Anglican Church. His grandfather, the Revd. Robert Hamilton Moberly was Bishop of Stepney and Dean of Salisbury. His great-grandfather, Canon Robert Campbell Moberly, served in the Ecclesiastical Household of both Queen Victoria and Edward VII. His great-great-grandfather, George Moberly, was headmaster of Winchester College before becoming Bishop of Salisbury. Moberly is thus a great-nephew of the philosopher-theologian and university administrator Sir Walter Hamilton Moberly (his grandfather's eldest brother). Like many members of his family, Moberly was educated at Winchester College.

== Academic career ==
Moberly completed his undergraduate studies in Classics at New College, Oxford, where he earned an MA. He went on to study for an MA in Theology at Selwyn College, Cambridge alongside ordination training in the Anglican faith at Ridley Hall. However, he postponed his ordination to pursue a PhD, under the supervision of John A. T. Robinson. Moberly was based at Trinity College, Cambridge for his PhD and received his degree in 1981.

In 1985, he started working in the Theology department at Durham University as a temporary lecturer, before taking on a permanent lectureship in 1989 at the same university. He has also worked with the Center of Theological Inquiry in Princeton, New Jersey.

In 2011, Moberly was one of the speakers at the Society for the Study of Theology's annual conference with his talk entitled, "Knowing God and knowing about God: Martin Buber’s Two Types of Faith revisited". In 2018, Moberly served as President of the Society for Old Testament Study. In 2020, he was chosen to deliver the Hulsean Lectures at Faculty of Divinity, University of Cambridge. The 6-lecture series, entitled "The God of Christian Scripture", was delivered between 29 January and 4 March and formed the basis of his book, "The God of the Old Testament: Encountering the Divine in Christian Scripture". In 2025, he delivered the annual Hayward lecture series at Acadia Divinity College in Canada. In the same year, he was keynote speaker at Saint Vladimir's Orthodox Theological Seminary's fourth annual academic symposium, delivering an address titled "Orthodox Biblical Scholarship: Possibilities and Prospects".

Moberly has cited Jon D. Levenson as his "academic hero", as well as Brevard S. Childs and Nicholas Lash as his influences. American theologian Brent A. Strawn has named Moberly among his favourite authors on theological and existential engagement.

As of 2026, Moberly's academic title is Professor Emeritus.

== Views on homosexuality ==
Durham University has named Moberly as one of its theologians who are "driving the discussion forward on same-sex relationships and equal marriage". His notable writing on this topic is a paper on the use of scripture in debates about homosexuality, published in the journal Theology in 2000. Without taking an explicit stance in favour of or against homosexuality, Moberly argued that Christians should listen to what gay and lesbian rights advocates have to say, and not "exercise judgement in the sense of passing sentence on people as people. That kind of judgement is the sole prerogative of God". At the same time, the paper urged LGBTQ+ rights advocates to refrain from describing all opposition to homosexuality and same-sex marriage as "homophobic" or "oppressive", equating such practice to the "misunderstanding and misrepresentation" directed towards gays and lesbians themselves.

== Personal life ==
Moberly was ordained in the Church of England as a deacon in 1981 and a priest in 1982. Prior to his academic career at Durham, from 1981 to 1985, he was a curate at Knowle Parish Church, near Birmingham. He has been part of the Diocese of Durham since 1985 and has permission to officiate.

Moberly was a junior international chess player in his youth. He played for Hampshire against Oxfordshire in the Shannon Championship in 1970. He represented the University of Oxford in the annual varsity matches against Cambridge in 1971, 1973, and 1974.

Moberly and his wife Jennifer have 2 children. The Rev Dr Jennifer Moberly is an ordained Anglican minister, a tutor at Cranmer Hall, and an honorary research fellow in Theology at Durham University.

== Works ==
=== Books ===
- Moberly, R. W. L. (1983). At the Mountain of God: Story and Theology in Exodus 32-34. Sheffield: JSOT Press.
- ——— (1992). The Old Testament of the Old Testament: Patriarchal Narratives and Mosaic Yahwism. Minneapolis: Fortress Press. ISBN 978-0-800-61561-1.
- ——— (1992). Genesis 12-50. Sheffield: JSOT Press.
- ——— (1992). From Eden to Golgotha: Essays in Biblical Theology. Atlanta: Scholars Press.
- ——— (2000). The Bible, Theology, and Faith: A Study of Abraham and Jesus. Cambridge: Cambridge University Press. ISBN 978-0-521-77222-8.
- ———; Rogerson, John W. (2001). Genesis and Exodus: with an Introduction by John Goldingay. Sheffield: Sheffield Academic Press. ISBN 978-1-841-27191-0.
- ——— (2006). Prophecy and Discernment. Cambridge Studies in Christian Doctrine. Cambridge: Cambridge University Press. ISBN 978-0-521-05104-0.
- ——— (2009). The Theology of the Book of Genesis. Old Testament Theology. Cambridge and New York: Cambridge University Press. ISBN 978-0-521-86631-6.
- ——— (2013). Old Testament Theology: Reading the Hebrew Bible as Christian Scripture. Grand Rapids: Baker Academic. ISBN 978-0-801-04885-2.
- ——— (2018). The Bible in a Disenchanted Age: The Enduring Possibility of Christian Faith. Theological Explorations for the Church Catholic. Grand Rapids: Baker Academic. ISBN 978-0-801-09951-9.

=== Articles & chapters ===
- ——— (2003). "Does God Lie to His Prophets? The Story of Micaiah ben Imlah As a Test Case" (PDF). Harvard Theological Review. 96 (1): 1–23. doi:10.1017/S0017816003000312. S2CID 171070217.
- ——— (2008). "Biblical Criticism and Religious Belief". Journal of Theological Interpretation. 2 (1): 71–100. doi:10.2307/26421447. JSTOR 26421447. S2CID 248841604.
- ——— (2008). "'In God We Trust'? The Challenge of the Prophets". Ex Auditu. 24: 18–33.
- ——— (2009). "What is Theological Interpretation of Scripture?". Journal of Theological Interpretation. 3 (2): 161–178. doi:10.2307/26421287. JSTOR 26421287. S2CID 248838099.
- ——— (2010). "On Reading and Teaching the Old Testament". Concilium. 2010 (2): 91–98.
