= Robert Campbell Moberly =

English theologian (1845–1903)

The Reverend Canon Robert Campbell Moberly
- Regius Professor of Pastoral Theology; Canon of Christ Church Cathedral, Oxford (ex officio)
- Installed: 1892
- Term ended: 1903
- Predecessor: Francis Paget
- Successor: Robert Lawrence Ottley
- Other post: Chaplain-in-Ordinary to Edward VII (1901-1903)
- Previous posts: Honorary Chaplain to Queen Victoria (1898-1901); Vicar of Great Budworth (1880-1892)

Orders
- Ordination: 1869 (deacon); 1870 (priest)

Personal details
- Born: 26 July 1845
- Died: 8 June 1903 (aged 57)
- Denomination: Anglicanism
- Spouse: Alice Sidney Hamilton (m. 1880)
- Children: 5, including Walter and Robert Hamilton Moberly
- Education: Twyford School; Winchester College
- Father: George Moberly
- Relatives: Charlotte Anne Moberly (sister); George Herbert Moberly, John Moberly (brothers); Walter Kerr Hamilton (father-in-law)

Academic background
- Education: New College and Christ Church, University of Oxford

Academic work
- Discipline: Theology
- Institutions: University of Oxford

Principal of St Stephen's House, Oxford
- In office 1876–1878
- Preceded by: first incumbent
- Succeeded by: unknown

Principal of Salisbury Theological College
- In office 1878–1880
- Preceded by: John Daubeny
- Succeeded by: E. B. Ottley

Robert Campbell Moberly (26 July 1845 – 8 June 1903) was an English theologian and the first principal of St Stephen's House, Oxford (1876–1878).

== Early life and education ==
Moberly was the son of George Moberly, Bishop of Salisbury, and faithfully maintained the traditions of his father's teaching. He had 14 sibings, including sister Charlotte Anne and brothers George Herbert and John Cornerlius. He was educated at Twyford School and Winchester College before matriculating at New College, Oxford, as a scholar. He won the Newdigate Prize for a poem about Marie Antoinette during his studies and graduated with a second-class BA in literae humaniores in 1867.

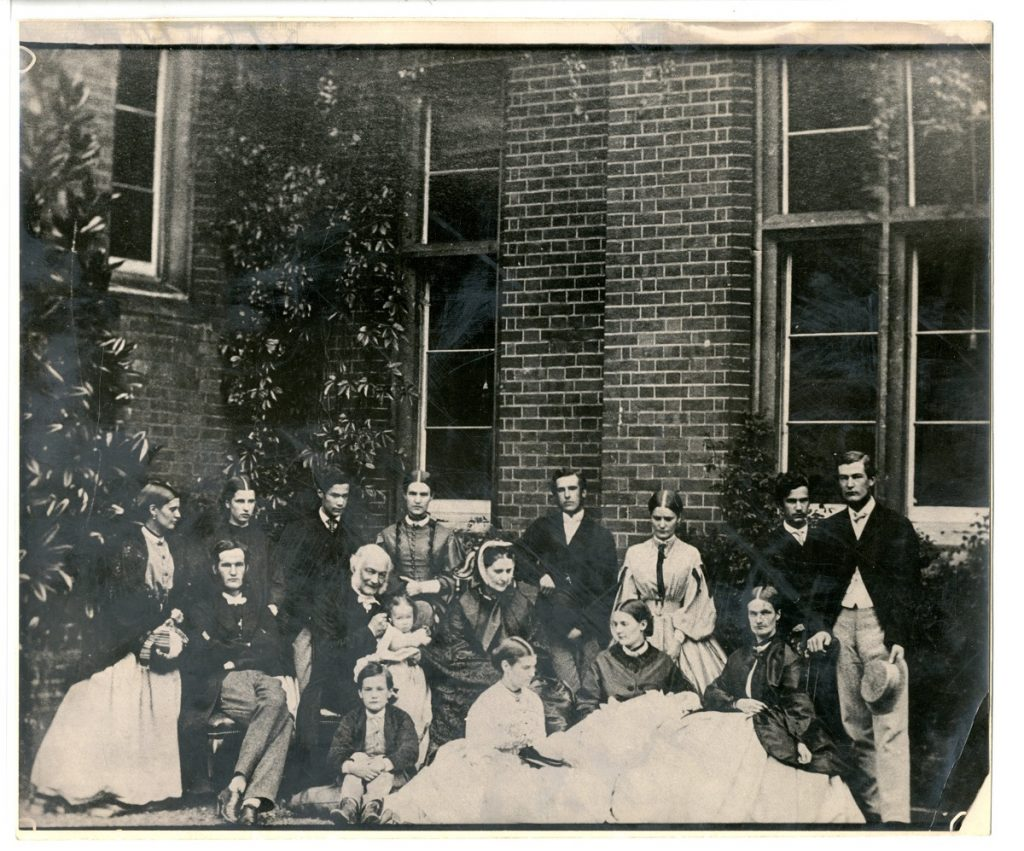
George Moberly (sitting at the centre) and his family on the ground of Winchester College in 1866. Robert Campbell Moberly stood at the far right in the photograph. Photo held by the Hampshire Archives Trust.

== Ecclesiastical career ==
Moberly joined Christ Church as a senior student in 1867 before being appointed as a tutor at the same college in 1869. In the same year, he was ordained as a deacon, followed by priesthood in 1870. He remained at Christ Church until 1876, when he joined Bishop Copleston on a trip to Ceylon and India for six months. His experience from the trip was later written up in his first book, An account of the question which has arisen between the Bishop and the Church Missionary Society in the Diocese of Colombo. After his return in 1876, he became the first head of St Stephen's House, Oxford, a ministry training institution that prepared Anglican clergy for missionary work overseas. From 1878, he presided for two years over the Theological College at Salisbury, where he also acted as his father's chaplain. In 1880, he became the vicar of Great Budworth in Cheshire, remaining in this post for 12 years.

In 1892, Lord Salisbury made him Regius Professor of Pastoral Theology at the University of Oxford and a canon of Christ Church Cathedral in that city. He was appointed an honorary chaplain to Queen Victoria in July 1898, and in early January 1901 was appointed Chaplain-in-Ordinary to Her Majesty. The Queen died later that month, and Moberly was re-appointed Chaplain-in-Ordinary to her successor, King Edward VII.

Throughout his career, Moberly was a prolific writer and his work continued to influence Anglo-Catholic scholarship long after his death. His most well-known work is Atonement and Personality, which presented "an explanation and a vindication of the doctrine of the atonement by the help of the conception of personality". The arguments made in the book were later built on in by eldest son, Walter Hamilton Moberly, in The Ethics of Punishment, published in 1968. His great-granddaughter Elizabeth Moberly, granddaughter of his second son Robert Hamilton Moberly, later built on both books in her doctoral thesis, entitled Suffering, Innocent and Guilty, published as a monograph in 1978.

== Personal life and death ==
In 1880, Moberly married Alice Sidney Hamilton, the daughter of his father's predecessor, Walter Kerr Hamilton. Together, they had five children:

1. Walter Hamilton Moberly (1881-1974), later Principal of University College of the South West of England and Vice-chancellor of University of Manchester. He was married and had 4 sons, including the diplomat John Moberly.
2. Robert Hamilton Moberly (1884-1978), later Bishop of Stepney and Dean of Salisbury. He was married and had 2 sons. The children of Robert Hamilton's elder son are Elizabeth Moberly and Robert Walter Lambert Moberly, both being theologians.
3. Arthur Hamilton Moberly (1886-1952), later an architect.
4. Violet Isabel Hamilton Moberly (1888-1918). She worked as a nurse during World War I and later died from the Spanish flu, contracted on duty.
5. George Hamilton Moberly (1891-1972). He was married with two sons, the younger of whom was the diplomat Patrick Moberly.

After a long period of delicate health he died in 1903 at Christ Church, Oxford.

== Selected publications ==
- Moberly, R. C. (1876). An account of the question which has arisen between the Bishop and the Church Missionary Society in the Diocese of Colombo. London and Oxford: James Parker and Co.
- —————— (1890). "The Incarnation as the Basis of Dogma". In Gore, Charles (ed.). Lux Mundi: A series of studies in the religion of the incarnation. London: John Murray. pp. 214–272.
- —————— (1896). Reason and Religion: some aspects of their mutual interdependence. London, New York, and Bombay: Longmans, Green and Co.
- —————— (1897). Ministerial Priesthood. London: John Murray.
- —————— (1899). Is the independence of church courts really impossible?. Oxford and London: James Parker and Co.
- —————— (1901). Atonement and Personality. London: John Murray.
- —————— (1902). Christ in Our Lives: Sermons chiefly preached in Oxford. London: John Murray.
- —————— (1902). Undenominationalism . London: John Murray – via Wikisource.
- —————— (1903). Sorrow, Sin, and Beauty: Three short series of addresses. London: John Murray.
- —————— (1904). Rackham, R. B. (ed.). Problems and Principles. London: John Murray. (posthumous publication)

The Journal of Theological Studies published a review of Moberly's writing by his eldest son, Walter Hamilton, in 1904.

== See also ==
Academic offices
Preceded by New position	Principal of St Stephen's House, Oxford; 1876–1877	Succeeded by unknown
