= Robert Hamilton Moberly =

7th Anglican Bishop of Stepney

- Dean of Salisbury
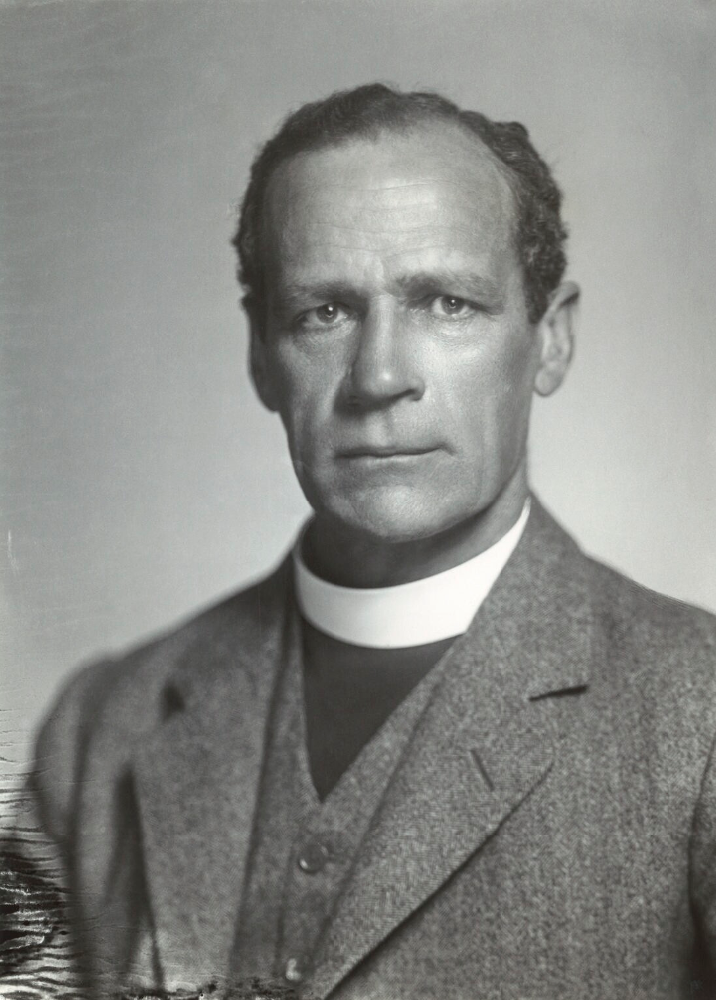
- Moberly in the 1930s
- Church: Church of England
- Installed: 1952
- Term ended: 1960
- Predecessor: Henry Charles Robins
- Successor: Kenneth Haworth
- Previous posts: Principal of Bishops' College, Cheshunt (1925-1936); Bishop of Stepney (1936-1952)

Orders
- Ordination: 1909 by Randall Davidson

Personal details
- Born: Robert Hamilton Moberly; 14 May 1884 Great Budworth, Cheshire
- Died: 16 September 1978 (aged 94) Chichester
- Denomination: Anglicanism
- Education: Winchester College
- Alma mater: New College, Oxford
- Spouse: Rosamund Vere (m. 1917)
- Children: 2
- Parents: Rev. Robert Campbell Moberly (father); Alice Sidney Moberly, née Hamilton (mother)
- Relatives: Walter Hamilton Moberly (brother); George Moberly (grandfather); Charlotte Anne Moberly (aunt); John Moberly (uncle)
- Military career
- Allegiance: United Kingdom
- Branch: British Army
- Service years: 1917-1919
- Unit: Royal Army Chaplains' Department
- Conflicts: World War I

Robert Hamilton Moberly (14 May 1884 – 16 September 1978) was the 7th Anglican Bishop of Stepney from 1936 until 1952 when he was appointed Dean of Salisbury.

== Early life and family ==
Moberly was born into an eminent ecclesiastical family on 14 May 1884. His father was the theologian Robert Campbell Moberly, Honorary Chaplain and Chaplains in Ordinary in the Ecclesiastical Household for Queen Victoria and her successor, Edward VII. His paternal grandfather was Bishop George Moberly and his maternal grandfather was Bishop Walter Kerr Hamilton. Moberly was the second of five children, with his elder brother being the academic Walter Hamilton Moberly.

Moberly was educated at Winchester College before matriculating at New College, Oxford. Known for being a brilliant scholar in his youth, he got a first in his Classical Moderations exams in 1905 and an overall first in his Literae humaniores and Theology BA in 1907, upgraded to an MA Oxon in 1911.

== Ecclesiastical career ==
Following the completion of his undergraduate studies, Moberly underwent ministerial training at Cuddesdon College. He was ordained in 1909 as a deacon by Randall Davidson, who would go on to become Archbishop of Canterbury. The following year, he was ordained into priesthood.

Between 1909 and 1914, Moberly was a curate in the parish of St Margaret's at Cliffe and West Cliffe near Dover, Kent. In 1914, he moved to South Africa to take up curacy in Benoni, then part of the former Transvaal province. As part of the British Great War efforts, he served from 1917 to 1919 as a Temporary Chaplain to the Forces (TCF), and was regarded as ‘A1’. He returned to South Africa in 1919 to become an examining chaplain firstly to the Bishop of Pretoria and then from 1922 to the Bishop of Johannesburg. He returned to England in 1924.

Moberly's first post upon his return to England was as principal of Bishops' College, Cheshunt from 1925 to 1936. At the same time, Moberly was also examining chaplain to the Bishop of St Alban. According to his obituary, he exchanged letters with many of his former ministry students until the end of his life. A sermon that he gave during this time at Cambridge University, titled "The Blessed Trinity", was published in the journal Theology in 1932. 1934 saw the publication of his first and only book, "The Great Friendship". Moberly was installed as the Suffragan Bishop of Stepney in 1936, a post he held until transferring to the Deanery at Salisbury sixteen years later. He retired from his post at Salisbury in 1960.

== Personal life and death ==
In 1917, he married Rosamund Vere née Smyth. The couple had two sons: Robert Basil, born in 1920 and Geoffrey Walter, born in 1923. The younger son died at sea in 1942 while serving in the Royal Navy during World War II. The theologians Elizabeth Moberly and R. W. L. Moberly are Moberly's grandchildren by his elder son.

Moberly died in Chichester on 16 September 1978.

Church of England titles
| Preceded by Charles Curzon | Bishop of Stepney; 1936 – 1952 | Succeeded by Joost de Blank |
| Preceded by Henry Robins | Dean of Salisbury; 1952 – 1960 | Succeeded by Kenneth Haworth |
