= St Michael's Church, Duntisbourne Rouse =

Coordinates: 51.7532°N 2.0226°W

St Michael's, Duntisbourne Rouse
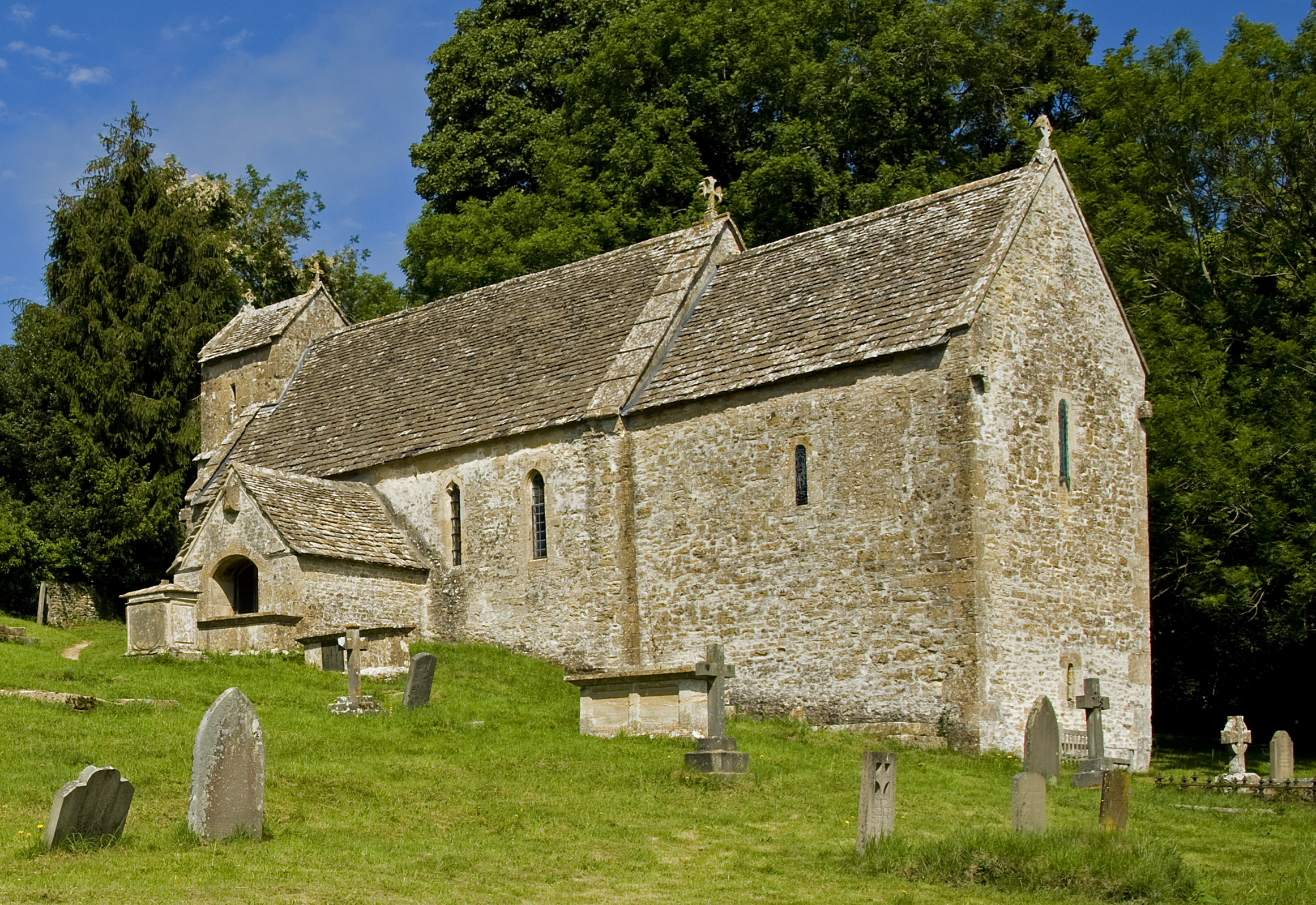

- Location in Gloucestershire
- Location: Duntisbourne Rouse, Gloucestershire
- Country: England
- Denomination: Anglican

History
- Status: Parish church
- Dedication: Saint Michael

Architecture
- Functional status: Active
- Heritage designation: Grade I
- Designated: 28 November 1958

Administration
- Province: Canterbury
- Diocese: Gloucester
- Archdeaconry: Cheltenham
- Deanery: Cirencester

St Michael's Church is an Anglican church in the Cotswold village of Duntisbourne Rouse, Gloucestershire, England. It dates from no later than the 11th or 12th century and, since 1958, has been designated a Grade I listed building. It is an active parish church in the Diocese of Gloucester, the archdeaconry of Cheltenham and the deanery of Cirencester.

== History ==
Duntisbourne Rouse is one of a few settlements in the vicinity named after Dunt, a Saxon chief. Following the Norman conquest, the land was owned by a knight named Le Rous. The church dates from no later than the late 11th or early 12th century, although the nave is now thought to have been built in Saxon times. The chancel is from the 12th century and a tower was added in the 16th century. The church underwent restoration in the 1930s, by Sidney Gambier-Parry. It was designated a Grade I listed building on 26 November 1958. The Grade I listing is for buildings "exceptional interest, sometimes considered to be internationally important".

== Architecture ==
=== Exterior ===
The church is constructed of rubble limestone with herringbone stonework on the north and east walls, and stone-slate roofs. There are doorways to the north (now blocked) and south. The south door has a triangular head and is covered by a porch which has a chamfered segmental arch. The south wall of the nave contains two lancet windows and a two-light Perpendicular window with a square head, added in the 15th century. There are no windows in the north wall.

The tower to the west is of ashlar. It sits on a chamfered plinth and has two stages, with a saddleback roof. There are small slit windows on the north and south sides. An inscription reads "THIS WAS BUILT BY JOHN HADEN MASON JOHN FREEMAN AND JOHN HOSKINS BEING WARDENS A.D. OI 1587". The church sits on a steep slope and there is a crypt in the ground beneath the chancel.

=== Interior and fittings ===
The internal walls are limewashed and the floor is stone. The nave is without aisles and has timber panelling on the walls. It has panelled box pews and bracket lights with brass ornaments from the Victorian era. The Jacobean pulpit is hexagonal, constructed of carved wood, and there is an octagonal stone font. The doorway from the nave to the tower has a pointed arch. The tower has an internal staircase leading to its two bells; one from the 14th century and one from the 15th century.

The walls of the chancel were decorated in the early 13th century with paintings done in red ochre that only survive in fragments, most complete on the north wall. It has a stylised masonry and six-petalled flower pattern. The choir stalls have misericords carved with grotesque heads and vine leaves; they date from the 15th century. It is not clear whether the misericords were originally installed in this church, or imported from elsewhere.

An organ was donated to the church by the sisters of New Zealand modernist writer Katherine Mansfield.
