= Bulley =

Village in Gloucestershire, England

Coordinates: 51.8758°N 2.3476°W

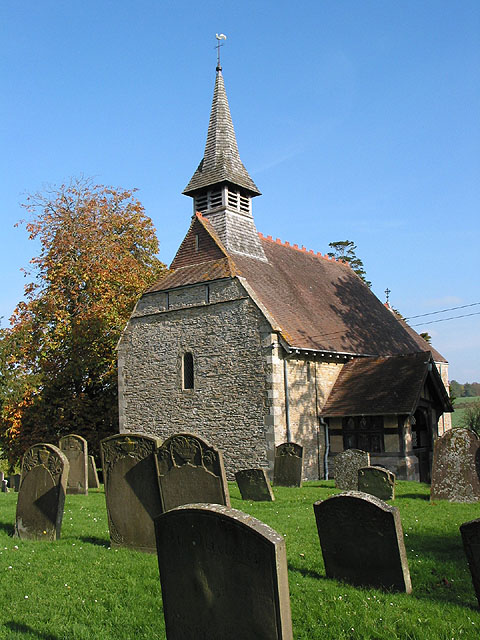
- St Michael and All Angels parish church

- Location within Gloucestershire
- OS grid reference: SO761196
- Civil parish: Churcham
- District: Forest of Dean
- Shire county: Gloucestershire
- Region: South West
- Country: England
- Sovereign state: United Kingdom
- Post town: Gloucester
- Postcode district: GL2
- Dialling code: 01452
- Police: Gloucestershire
- Fire: Gloucestershire
- Ambulance: South Western
- UK Parliament: Forest of Dean

Bulley is a village and former civil parish, now in the parish of Churcham, in the Forest of Dean district, in Gloucestershire, almost 7 miles (11 km) west of the city of Gloucester and about 1 mile (1.6 km) north of the village of Churcham. In 1931 the parish had a population of 134.

== Parish church ==
The Church of England parish church of St Michael and All Angels has been a dependent chapelry of St Andrew's parish church, Churcham since at least AD 1100. Both St Andrew's and St Michael's are now members of the Forest Edge group of churches.

St Michael's building is Norman. A Perpendicular Gothic window on the south side of the nave is a fifteenth-century addition. In 1886 the building was restored under the direction of the architect Sidney Gambier-Parry. The church is a Grade I listed building.

== Secular history ==
Bulley has had a long association with Churcham. When a parish school was founded for Churcham and Bulley in 1856 it was built at Bulley. Under the Local Government Act 1894 Bulley was made a separate civil parish, but on 1 April 1935 it was merged with Churcham.

== Sources ==
- Elrington, C. R.; Herbert, N.M.; Pugh, R. B. (eds.); Morgan, Kathleen; Smith, Brian S. (1972). A History of the County of Gloucester, Volume 10: Westbury and Whitstone Hundreds. Victoria County History. pp. 11–29.
- Verey, David (1970). Gloucestershire: The Vale and the Forest of Dean. The Buildings of England. Vol. 2. Harmondsworth: Penguin Books. pp. 117–118.
