= Walter Hamilton Moberly =

British academic

Sir Walter Hamilton Moberly GBE KCB DSO
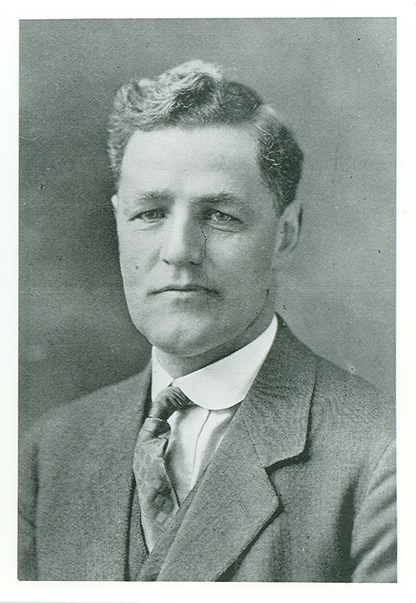
- Moberly in 1925, during his time as principal of the University College of the South West of England
- Born: 20 October 1881; Budworth, Cheshire
- Died: 31 January 1974 (aged 92)
- Spouse: Gwendolen Gardner (m. 1921)
- Children: 4 including John Moberly
- Parents: Rev. Robert Campbell Moberly (father); Alice Sidney Moberly, née Hamilton (mother)
- Relatives: Robert Moberly (brother); George Moberly (grandfather); Charlotte Anne Moberly (aunt); John Moberly (uncle); Robert Awdry (cousin); R. W. L. Moberly (great nephew)

Academic background
- Education: Winchester College
- Alma mater: New College, Oxford

Academic work
- Discipline: Political Science, Philosophy
- Institutions: University of Aberdeen; Merton College, Oxford; Lincoln College, Oxford; University of Birmingham

Chairman of The University Grants Committee
- In office 1935–1949
- Preceded by: Sir Walter Riddell, 12th Baronet
- Succeeded by: A. E. Trueman

Vice-chancellor of University of Manchester
- In office 1926–1934
- Preceded by: Sir Henry Alexander Miers
- Succeeded by: John Stopford, Baron Stopford of Fallowfield

Principal of University College of the South West of England
- In office 1925–1926
- Preceded by: Sir Hector Hetherington
- Succeeded by: John Murray

Military service
- Allegiance: United Kingdom
- Branch: British Army
- Rank: Lieutenant, Acting Captain
- Unit: Oxfordshire and Buckinghamshire Light Infantry
- Conflict: World War I
- Awards: Distinguished Service Order

Religious life
- Religion: Christianity
- Denomination: Anglicanism

Senior posting
- Organisation: The Moot

Sir Walter Hamilton Moberly GBE KCB DSO (20 October 1881 – 31 January 1974) was a British academic, born into a clerical dynasty.

== Early life ==
Walter Hamilton Moberly was born on 20 October 1881 in Great Budworth, Cheshire to Alice Sidney, née Hamilton (1851–1939) and Rev. Robert Campbell Moberly. He was a grandson of George Moberly and Walter Kerr Hamilton, both had been Bishop of Salisbury. One of his aunts was Charlotte Anne Moberly, first Principal of St Hugh's College, Oxford. Moberly was the eldest of 5 children, growing up with one sister and three brothers, including Robert and Arthur. He was educated at Winchester College and New College, Oxford.

== Career ==
Moberly became a lecturer in political science at the University of Aberdeen from 1905 to 1906. He was a fellow of Merton College, Oxford, from 1904 to 1907. While Fellow and Lecturer in philosophy at Lincoln College, Oxford he contributed essays on "The Atonement" and "God and the Absolute" to the symposium Foundations: A Statement of Christian Belief in Terms of Modern Thought, published in 1912.

He served in World War I with the Oxfordshire and Buckinghamshire Light Infantry, being twice mentioned in despatches and injured three times. He was awarded a Distinguished Service Order for his military service in 1917.

After the war, he was professor of philosophy at the University of Birmingham from 1921 to 1924, Principal of the University College of the South West of England from 1925 to 1926, Vice-Chancellor of the University of Manchester from 1926 to 1934, Chairman of the University Grants Committee from 1935 to 1949 and the first Principal of St Catharine's Foundation from 1949 to 1955, alongside E. Amy Buller as Warden. He was particularly remembered in his tenure at Manchester for building partnerships between the university and local businesses, as well as for expanding the extension programme so that more non-students could access education at the university.

== Honours ==
Moberly was made Knight Bachelor by King George V in the 1934 Birthday Honours. He was made Knight Commander of the Order of the Bath in the 1944 Birthday Honours, then Knight Grand Cross of the Most Excellent Order of the British Empire in the 1949 Birthday Honours by King George VI.

Moberly also received several honorary doctorates during his lifetime, including:

- LittD from University of Manchester (1926)
- DLitt from University of Nottingham (1949)
- LLD from Queen's University Belfast (1949)
- DLitt from Keele University (1965)

== Personal life ==
Moberly married a former student, Gwendolen Gardner (1892–1975), on 29 December 1921. She had studied political philosophy with him at Oxford. They had four sons:

1. Edward Walter Moberly (1922–2004)
2. Sir John Campbell Moberly (1925–2004), a diplomat who was the British Ambassador to Jordan and Iraq. He was married to Dr Patience Moberly (née Proby).
3. Rev Richard Hamilton Moberly (1930–2022), who followed the Moberly family tradition in clergy. He was married to the activist and Labour politician Patricia Moberly (née Coney).
4. Robert William Gardner Moberly (born in 1933), an advertising executive who co-founded the designing consultancy Lewis Moberly with his wife and business partner Mary Lewis.

Moberly was great-uncle to the theologians Elizabeth Moberly and R. W. L. Moberly, grandchildren of his younger brother Robert. Elizabeth, in particular, built on Moberly's work in her doctoral thesis and debut monograph, Suffering, Innocent and Guilty, published in 1978.

== Legacy ==
Moberly Tower, a hall of residence at the Victoria University of Manchester was named after the former vice-chancellor. It was part of the refectory complex built in the 1960s before being demolished and replaced by the Alan Gilbert Learning Commons.

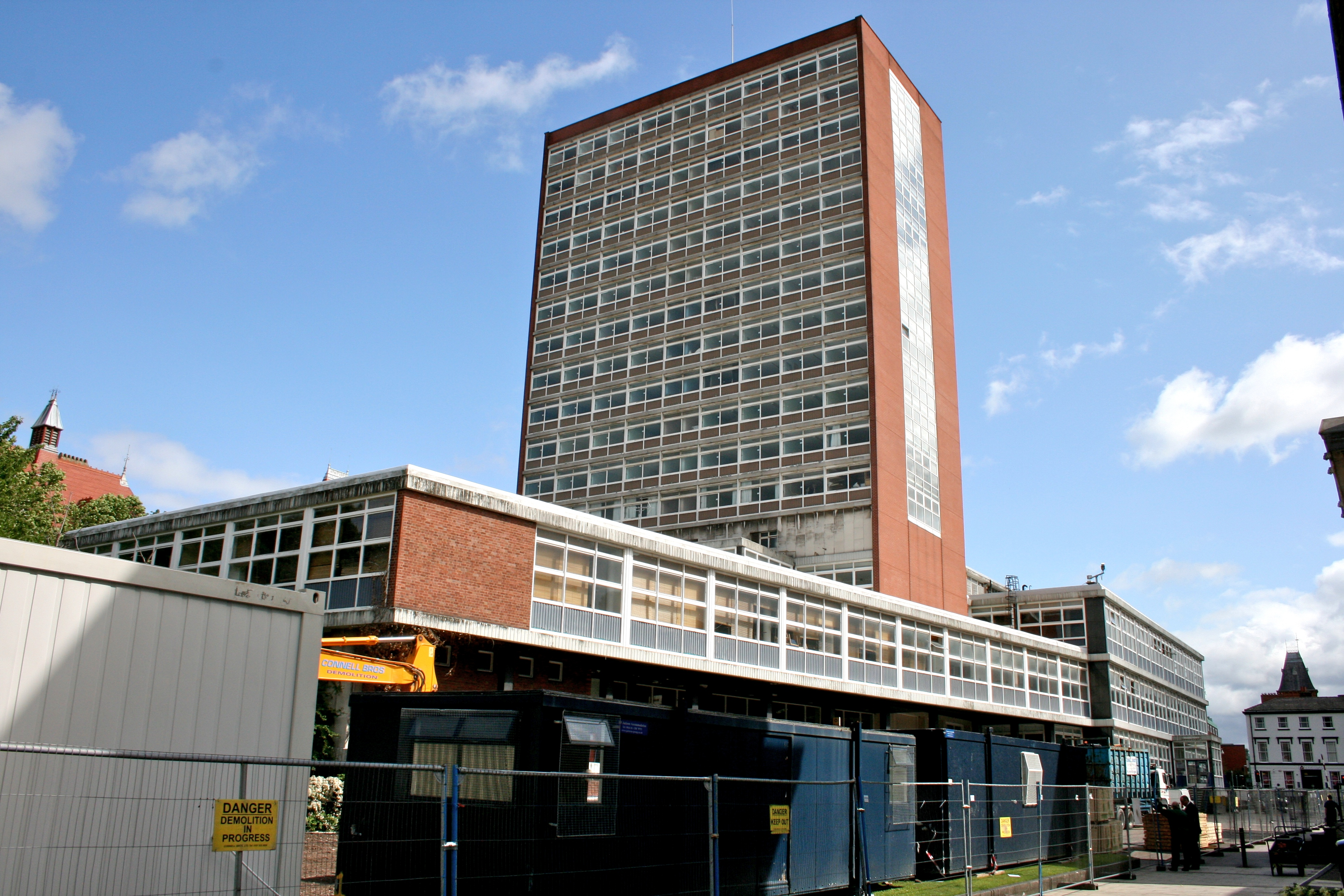
Moberly Tower at University of Manchester, before its demolition.

Moberly was also the namesake of the Walter Moberly Building at Keele University. It was built in 1954 and originally named the Conference Hall before being renamed the Walter Moberly Hall in May 1960. This recognised Moberly's contribution to the creation of the experimental University College of North Staffordshire (the "Keele Experiment"), which received the Royal Charter as the Keele University in 1962.

A University of Exeter hall of residence, built in 1966, was also named after him. It was demolished in 2018 and rebuilt in 2020.

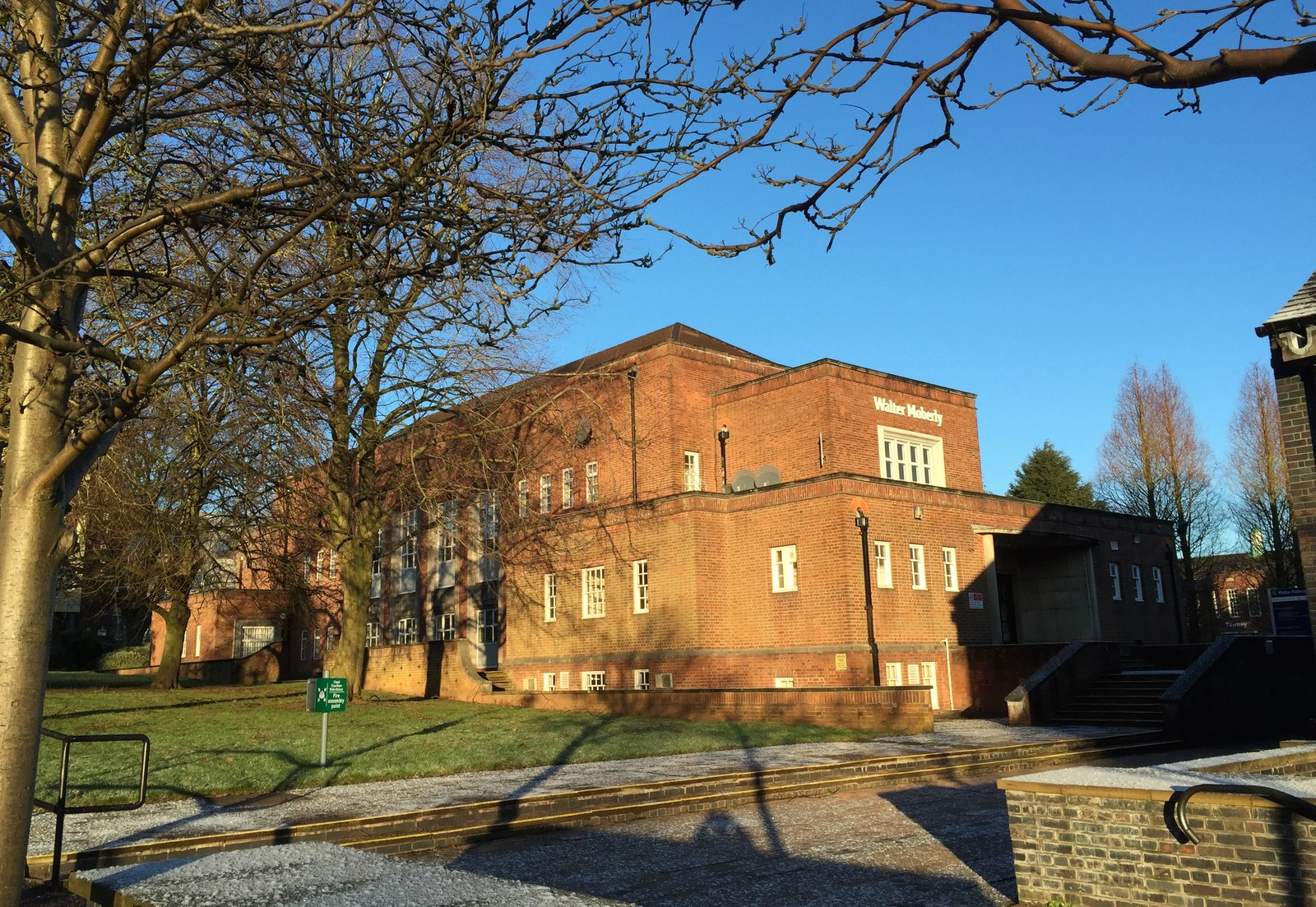
The Walter Moberly Hall at Keele University

== Selected publications ==
- Streeter, B. H.; Brook, R; Rawlinson, A. E. J.; Moberly, W. H.; Talbot, N. S.; Parsons, R. G.; Temple, W. (1913) [1912]. Foundations: A statement of Christian belief in terms of modern thought by seven Oxford men (Reprinted ed.). London: Macmillan and Co.
- Moberly, Walter (1914). Christian conduct in war time. Papers for War Time. London: Oxford University Press.
- ——————— (1949). The Crisis in the University. London: SCM Press.
- ——————— (1950). Universities: Ancient & Modern. Manchester: Manchester University Press.
- Baillie, James (1952). ———————; de Selincourt, Oliver (eds.). Reflections on Life and Religion. London: George Allen and Unwin.
- ——————— (1965) [1951]. Legal responsibility and moral responsibility. Philadelphia, Pennsylvania : Fortress Press.
- ——————— (1968). The Ethics of Punishment. London: Faber & Faber. ISBN 0-571-08438-9.

Academic offices
Preceded by Hector Hetherington	Principal of the University College of the South West; 1925-1926	Succeeded by John Murray
Academic offices
Preceded by Henry Alexander Miers	Vice-Chancellor of the Victoria University of Manchester; 1926-1934	Succeeded by John Stopford, Baron Stopford of Fallowfield
