= Henry Robins (priest) =

Dean of Salisbury in the Church of England

Henry Charles Robins was the Dean of Salisbury in the Church of England from 1943 until his retirement in 1953.
Born in Beccles on 2 February 1882 and educated at Winchester and New College, Oxford, he was ordained into the priesthood in 1908. His first post was as a Curate at St John’s, Gosport after which he was an Assistant Chaplain in Khartoum then Vicar of Fleet. In July 1918, he joined the Army Chaplain's Department. At 6 feet 2 inches, he was an impressive figure, and served at Catterick Garrison and then in France until he was demobilised in 1920. He was described as 'able... lacks in tact and patience in dealing with men' From 1922 to 1943 he held incumbencies at Chafford, Barking and Portsmouth before his elevation to the Deanery. An Honorary Chaplain to the King, he died on 31 July 1960; and his wife Dorothy 9 years later.

Church of England titles
Preceded by Edward Lowry Henderson	Dean of Salisbury; 1943 –1952	Succeeded by Robert Hamilton Moberly
