= Duntisbourne Rouse =

Village in Gloucestershire, England

Coordinates: 51.757°N 2.027°W

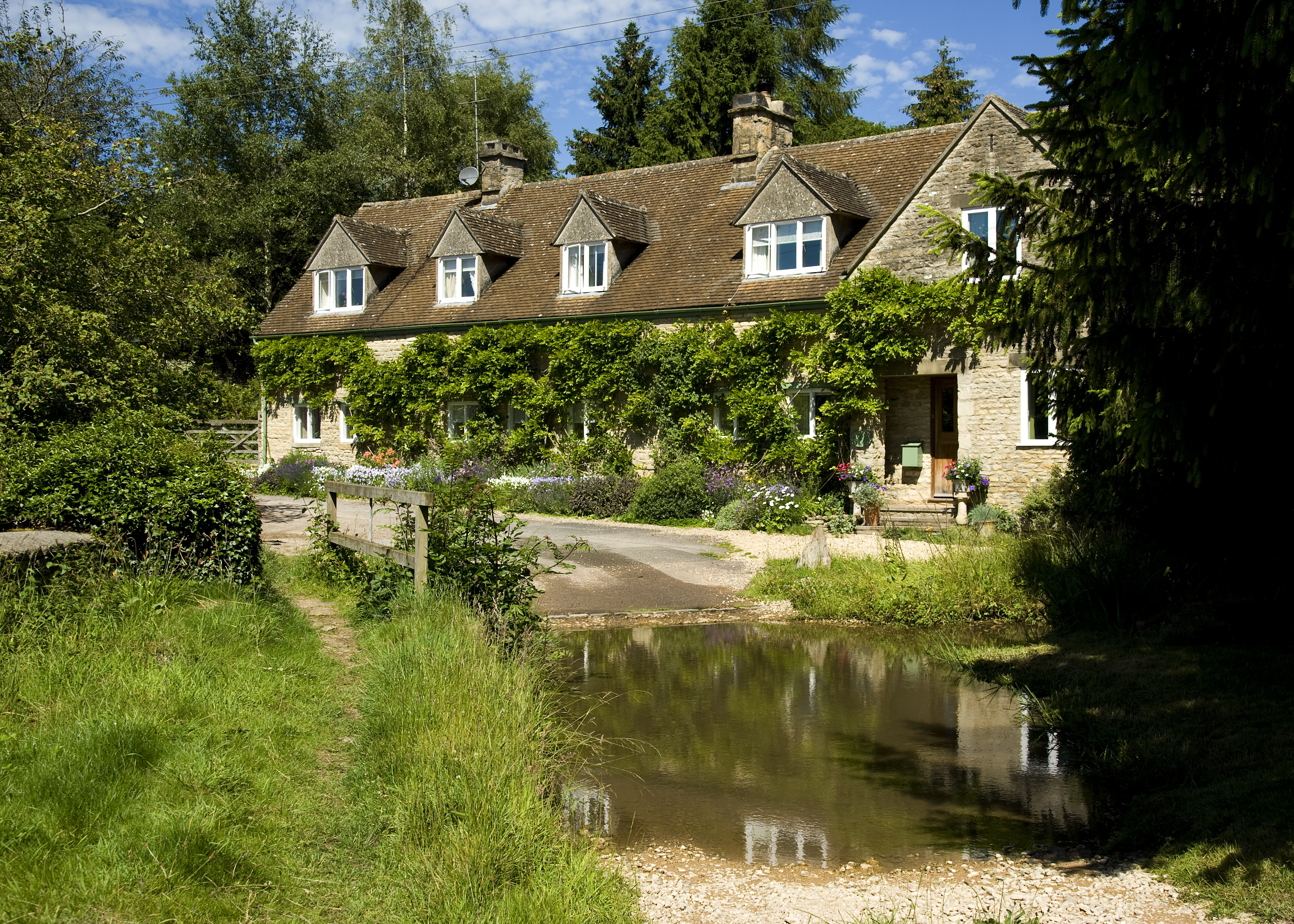
- The ford at Duntisbourne Rouse

- Location within Gloucestershire
- Population: 70 (2001)
- Civil parish: Duntisbourne Rouse
- District: Cotswold
- Shire county: Gloucestershire
- Region: South West
- Country: England
- Sovereign state: United Kingdom
- Post town: CIRENCESTER
- Postcode district: GL7
- Dialling code: 01285
- Police: Gloucestershire
- Fire: Gloucestershire
- Ambulance: South Western
- UK Parliament: North Cotswolds

Duntisbourne Rouse is a village and civil parish in Gloucestershire, England. It lies in the Cotswolds, an Area of Outstanding Natural Beauty. At the 2001 census, it had a population of 70.

== History ==
=== Toponymy ===
The village was recorded as Duntesburne in 1055 and Duntesborne in the 1086 Domesday Book, the name coming from the Old English for "stream of a man called Dunt". The manorial affix came from a family called le Rous, who were at one time the lords of the manor. By 1287, the village was known as Duntesbourn Rus.

== Governance ==
The parishes of Duntisbourne Rouse and the neighbouring village of Duntisbourne Abbots are covered by Duntisbournes Parish Council. Duntisbourne Rouse is part of the Ermin ward of the district of Cotswold and has one councillor. It is within the constituency of North Cotswolds, represented in parliament by Conservative MP Sir Geoffrey Clifton-Brown. It was part of the South West England constituency of the European Parliament prior to Britain leaving the European Union in January 2020.

== Geography ==
Duntisbourne Rouse is in the county of Gloucestershire, and lies within the Cotswolds, a range of hills designated an Area of Outstanding Natural Beauty. It is approximately 16 km (9.9 mi) south-east of Gloucester and approximately 6.5 km (4.0 mi) north-west of Cirencester. Nearby villages include Duntisbourne Abbots, Duntisbourne Leer, Bagendon and Daglingworth.

== Church ==
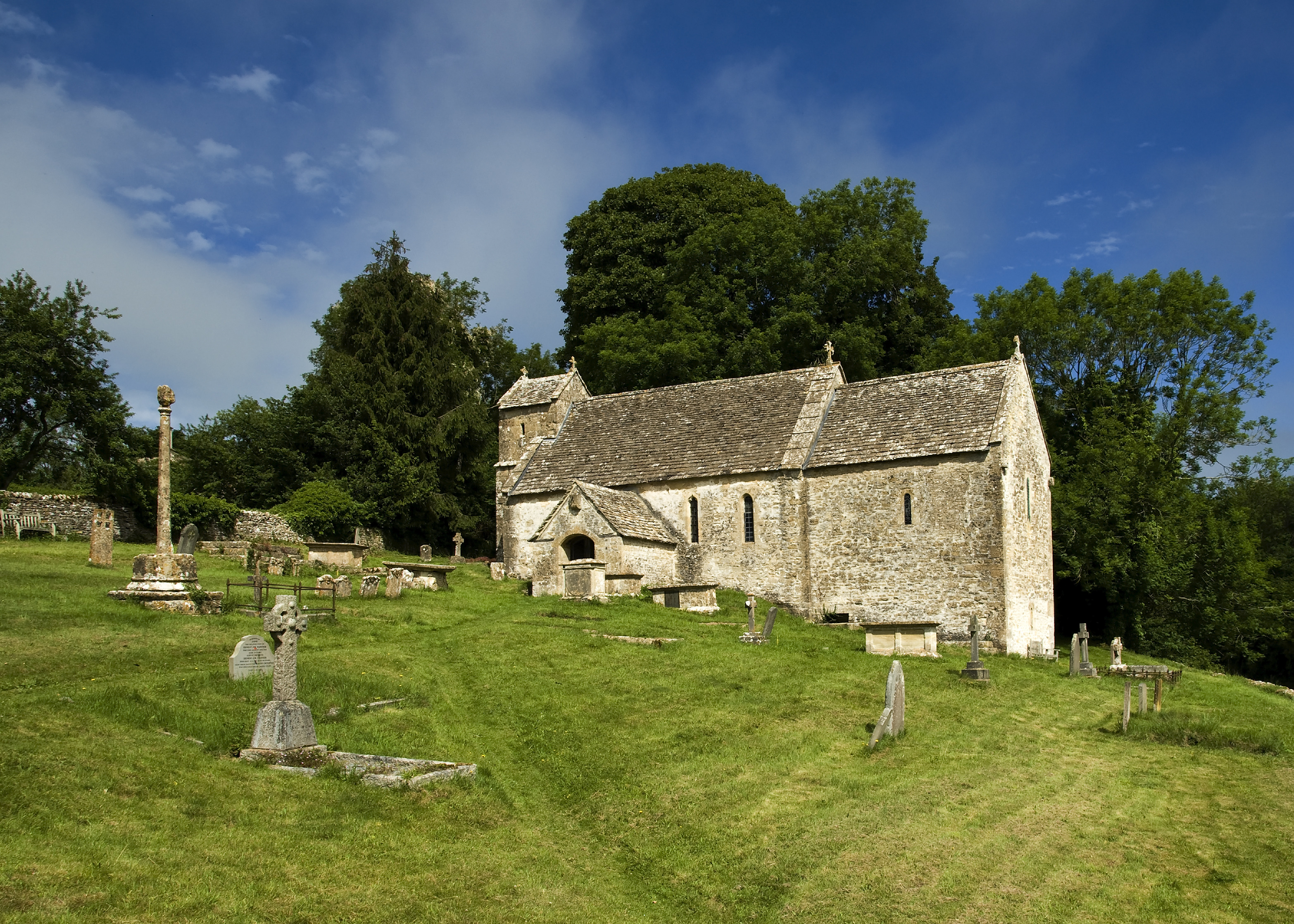
St. Michael's church

The church at Duntisbourne Rouse is dedicated to St. Michael and is located on the side of a hill overlooking the Dunt valley. The church, which dates from Saxon times, includes a small crypt beneath the building. The chancel was added in Norman times. The choir stalls contain five misericords. Whether they were originally installed in this church or imported from elsewhere is unknown. The windows date from the 12th century, the tower from the 15th century and the pews and panelling from the 18th century. The organ was donated by Vera, Charlotte and Jeanne Beauchamp in memory of their sister, modernist writer Katherine Mansfield. A plaque to this effect is located on the side of the organ. The church was designated a Grade I listed building by English Heritage on 26 November 1958.

== Notable people ==
- George Herbert Moberly (1837–1895), Rector 1871–1880
