= Duntisbourne Leer =

Coordinates: 51.766°N 2.037°W

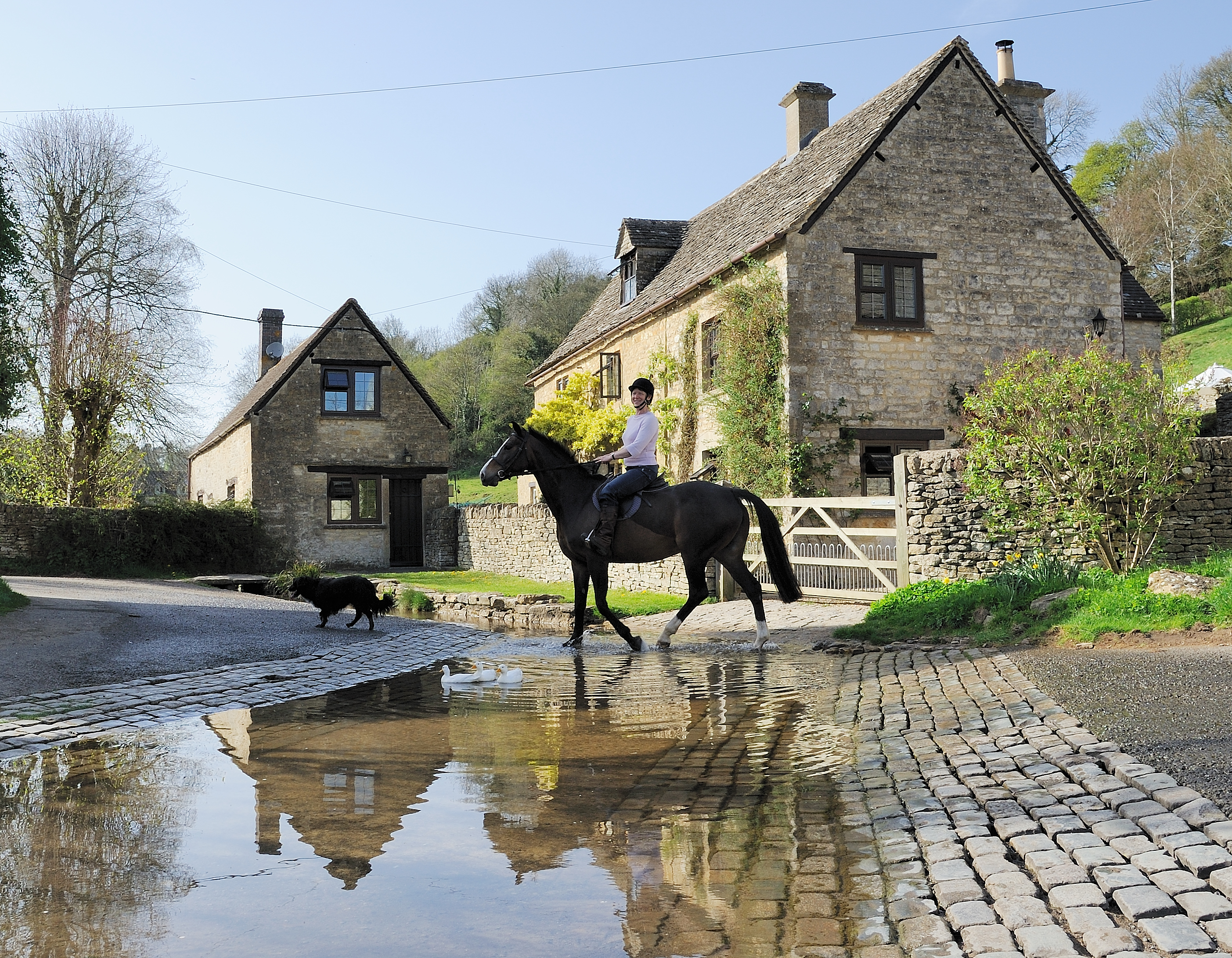
- Duntisbourne Leer Ford

- Location within Gloucestershire
- OS grid reference: SO975075
  - London: 84 mi (135 km)
- Civil parish: Duntisbournes
- District: Cotswold
- Shire county: Gloucestershire
- Region: South West
- Country: England
- Sovereign state: United Kingdom
- Post town: CIRENCESTER
- Postcode district: GL7
- Dialling code: 01285
- Police: Gloucestershire
- Fire: Gloucestershire
- Ambulance: South Western
- UK Parliament: North Cotswolds

Duntisbourne Leer is a hamlet in the county of Gloucestershire, and lies within the Cotswolds, a range of hills designated an Area of Outstanding Natural Beauty. It is approximately 10.5 miles (16.9 km) southeast of Gloucester and approximately 4.5 miles (7.2 km) northwest of Cirencester.

The village was recorded as Duntesborne: Lyre Abbey in the Domesday Book, the name coming from the Old English for "stream of a man called Dunt" and the fact the hamlet belonged to the Abbey of Lyre in Normandy. Nutbeam Farmhouse is a Grade II* listed building, dating in part from the 15th century, and part of the former monastic estate.

Duntisbourne Leer sits in 'The Duntisbournes' parish, a string of four pretty villages along the valley of the Dunt Stream. Duntisbourne Abbots is the largest village, south of which is Duntisbourne Leer, followed by Middle Duntisbourne and Duntisbourne Rouse.

At Duntisbourne Leer, Dunt Stream is shallow and crosses the road, creating a Ford (crossing).

The Dunt Stream flows into the River Churn near Cirencester, a tributary of the River Thames.
