= Elizabeth Moberly =

British theologian, proponent of "reparative therapy" to cure homosexuality

- Born: Elizabeth Rosamund Moberly; 18 September 1949 (age 77); Whyteleafe, Surrey, England
- Known for: Influences in the practice of Conversion therapy
- Relatives: R. W. L. Moberly (brother); Robert Hamilton Moberly (grandfather); Robert Campbell Moberly (great-grandfather); Walter Hamilton Moberly (great uncle)

Academic background
- Education: Croydon High School
- Alma mater: Lady Margaret Hall, Oxford; University of Cambridge
- Thesis: Atonement and personality: The consequences of wrongdoing and the possibilities of their transformation (1977)
- Doctoral advisor: John Macquarrie
- Influences: Charles W. Socarides

Academic work
- Discipline: Theology
- Institutions: Lucy Cavendish College, Cambridge; Clare College, Cambridge; Saint Vladimir's Orthodox Theological Seminary (visiting)
- Influenced: A. Dean Byrd; Joseph Nicolosi

Elizabeth Rosamund Moberly (born 18 September 1949 in Whyteleafe, Surrey) is a British theologian who resides in the United States. She is the author of Homosexuality: A New Christian Ethic, in which she suggests several possible causes of male homosexuality and a therapeutic cure. Despite her writings in psychology and psychiatry, and despite her influence on the controversial practice of "conversion therapy" for LGBTQ+ people, Moberly has solely had training in theology and her theories are not based on clinical research. Her theories have been universally discredited by professionals in the medical, psychiatric, and psychological fields.

== Background ==
There is limited public record about Elizabeth Moberly, especially regarding her educational background. An article by Basil Zion in St Vladimir's Theological Quarterly profiling her in 1988 described Moberly as an "Anglo-Dutch member of the Orthodox Church and the third member of the Moberly family to write on the theme of the atonement". The family members in question are the Rev Canon Robert Campbell Moberly, known for his 1901 book Atonement and Personality, and his son, Sir Walter Hamilton Moberly, who wrote the essay "The Atonement" 11 years later. Sir Walter Moberly also wrote The Ethics of Punishment (1968), the arguments in which Elizabeth Moberly later built upon in her doctoral thesis "Suffering, Innocent and Guilty". The same thesis also referenced the writings of Robert Campbell Moberly, her great grand-father.

The biographical details described by Basil Zion match with that of an Elizabeth Rosamund Moberly listed in the Moberly family's entry in Burke's Landed Gentry published in 1972. She was born on 18 September 1949, the elder child and only daughter of Robet Basil Moberly, an English civil servant and author and Elise Maria Hubertina (née Gitmans), originally from Limburg, Netherlands. Her grandfather was Bishop Robert Hamilton Moberly, second son of Canon Robert Campbell Moberly. Walter Hamilton Moberly, her grandfather's elder brother, is therefore Elizabeth Moberly's great uncle. Her younger brother is the theologian Robert Walter Lambert Moberly.

Elizabeth Moberly is also recorded in the register of Lady Margaret Hall, Oxford as one of its students between 1968 and 1972. The entry states that she had attended Croydon High School before matriculating as a scholar at Oxford, where she went on to achieve First-class grade in Classical Moderations and Second-class in Theology. She earned an MA as well as a DPhil from Oxford.

Some sources have reported that Moberly also holds an unspecified degree from the University of Cambridge.

Family and ancestry of Dr Elizabeth Moberly

Rev. Canon Robert Campbell Moberly	Alice Sidney (née Hamilton)
Sir Walter Hamilton Moberly; Had children and grandchildren	Rev. Bishop Robert Hamilton Moberly	Rosamund Vere (née Smyth)	+3 other children
Robert Basil Moberly	Elise Maria Hubertina (née Gitmans)	Geoffrey Walter Moberly; Died in 1942, unmarried and without children
Elizabeth Rosamund Moberly; Born in 1949	Robert Walter Lambert Moberly; Born in 1952

== Career ==
Moberly completed her doctorate in Theology under the supervision of the Rev Dr John Macquarrie. Her thesis was later published by SPCK in 1978 as a monograph entitled Suffering, Innocent and Guilty. In a review published in the academic journal Theology, David Anderson critiqued the book's lack of coherence as well as the way the way suffering was treated "from a distance".

Moberly was said to be a research psychologist, based at the University of Cambridge between 1978 and 1987. In 1980, in an article that she wrote for Theology, she is described as a "theologian and psychologist" and a "Guest Member of Lucy Cavendish College, Cambridge". In 1982, the journal Salmagundi noted that "Moberly teaches at Lucy Cavendish" in its contributors' biography section, without specifying which subject it was that she taught. She was reportedly a Leverhulme Fellow between 1981 and 1983. By 1984, her affiliation was listed in academic journal articles as that of Clare College, Cambridge. Moberly's training and credibility in the field of psychology, or lack thereof, have been called into question.

In the late 1970s, Moberly became inspired by the works of Charles W. Socarides, an American psychiatrist who opposed the removal of homosexuality as a disorder in the Diagnostic and Statistical Manual of Mental Disorders. In 1983, her second monograph, "Psychogenesis: The Early Development of Gender Identity", was published by Routledge and Kegan Paul; the introduction indicated that she had written the book in 1979, during her time at Lucy Cavendish College. Also published in 1983 was her third book, "Homosexuality: A New Christian Ethic". A review of both books in the journal Psychological Medicine described Moberly's arguments as "well-meaning but unconvincing". Criticising Moberly's lack of evidence and over-reliance on psychoanalysis, a reviewer in the International Journal of Social Psychiatry mockingly described the book as an example of "the art of using the minimum of words to say nothing". A review of "Psychogenesis" in particular, published in the Medico-Legal Society's Journal in 1983, described the book as "full of assertions, generalisations, paradoxes and speculations, unsupported by clinical or statistical observations". A later review of the same book in 1986, published in The Canadian Journal of Psychiatry, questioned the strength of Moberly's evidence, pointing to the lack of details on any patients or subjects involved in here research, unconvinced that a mere review of previous writings was adequate to state the case with such "unshakable conviction". Similarly, "Homosexuality: A New Christian Ethic" was criticised in the journal Medicine, Science and the Law for its lack of "case histories or statistical figures of therapeutic success" being reported.

Basil Zion, more sympathetic and generous towards Moberly's work, argued that the writer did not "condemn homosexuality as immorality and perversity". She nevertheless saw homosexuality as a "condition" that needs to be "understood and treated", and denounced the practice of "permit[ing] and bless[ing] homosexual erotic behaviour". As she explained in a response to Peter Coleman's review of her books in 1984: "There are no short-cuts to heterosexuality. The needs involved in the homosexual condition are entirely legitimate developmental needs, which must be met and not left unmet, if the capacity for heterosexuality is ever to be attained." Elsewhere, in a paper published in 1997, Moberly expressed disagreement with gay activists' protests and demonstrations against the "designation of homosexuality as a disorder treatable by psychiatry", epitomising what she saw as a "pattern of pressuring institutions and researchers to produce results favorable to homosexuals and then claiming the results as objective evidence". In the same article, she claimed that her views should not be characterised as "homophobia or bigotry" and urged for respectful debate from "both sides". In a rebuttal to Moberly's insistence on the pathological nature of homosexuality, in 1980, psychiatrist James Mathers argued on the subjective nature of what is categorised as abnormality or pathology, citing that "all known human societies contain homosexuals, but only some of them regard it as abnormal".

Despite criticisms of her publications, Moberly went on to speak at several high profile academic conferences in the UK and abroad following the release of her books. In 1984, she was a speaker at the annual conference of the Society for the Study of Theology, her paper entitled, "Personal meaning and theological truth". In 1985, she gave a guest lecture titled "New Perspectives on Homosexuality" to the Royal Society of Health. The same year also saw the publication of The Psychology of the self and others, a sequel to Psychogenesis, as well as Moberly's invitation to speak at the Psychoanalytic Self Psychology Conference in New York. Her paper from the conference, "The Psychogenesis of Gender Identity", was published the following year in Bulletin of the British Association of Psychotherapists, accompanied by a disclaimer of the controversial nature of the speaker's views. In the late 1980s, Moberly was a guest lecturer at Saint Vladimir's Orthodox Theological Seminary in New York, where she made claims of high success rate in curing men of homosexuality through "reparative therapy". While some audience members were sympathetic, not all were convinced by her claims. That said, such was the popularity and influence of her theories in the United States, much more than what she had achieved in her native country, that Moberly relocated to Pennsylvania in 1987. That year, she was reported in an article in The Daily Intelligencer to be Director of psychological education and therapy at the Institute of Christian Healing in Narberth. An article in the Syracuse Herald-Journal in 1993 noted Moberly's profession as a "teacher and author", and that she had been on talk shows such as The 700 Club, hosted at the time by the conservative Christian presenter Pat Robertson. At some point, she was involved in ministry to homosexuals as Director of Psychosexual Education and Therapy for Bible-Centered Ministries (BCM International), based in Philadelphia.

Moberly and other women became less prominent in the pro-conversion therapy movement by the 1990s, with their positions replaced by white men such as Joseph Nicolosi. As of 1997, she worked full-time in cancer research.

=== Influences on conversion therapy ===
Moberly's work has continued to be influential in the controversial practice of conversion therapy. Her work inspired that of A. Dean Byrd and Joseph Nicolosi, even as the latter gained more prominence and popularity compared to hers later on. In 2010, an undercover investigation into conversion therapy in the UK by The Independent noted that her work was referenced by a conversion therapist, specifically her theory about "the cannibalistic nature of homosexual sex". Moberly's influence in conversion therapy was referenced again in the GMC's investigation into another practitioner, as reported by The Guardian in 2011. In 2021, she was named in the UK Government's research into conversion therapy as an influential figure in the controversial practice. As argued by historian Chris Babits, the legacy of the work of Moberly and her contemporaries in conversion therapy is "profound and lasting psychological harm" to the people who have been subject to this so called "therapy".

== Bibliography ==
- Suffering, Innocent and Guilty (1978), S.P.C.K.
- Psychogenesis: The Early Development of Gender Identity (1983), Routledge and Kegan Paul.
- Homosexuality: A New Christian Ethic (1983), James Clarke & Co. ISBN 0-227-67850-8; ISBN 978-0-227-67850-3
- The Psychology of Self and Other (1985), Tavistock Publications. ISBN 0-422-79740-5; ISBN 978-0-422-79740-5
