= Moberly Lake =

Moberly Lake may refer to:

- Moberly Lake, British Columbia, a community in British Columbia, Canada
- Moberly Lake (British Columbia), a lake in British Columbia, Canada
- Moberly Lake Provincial Park, a park in British Columbia, Canada
