= Brent A. Strawn =

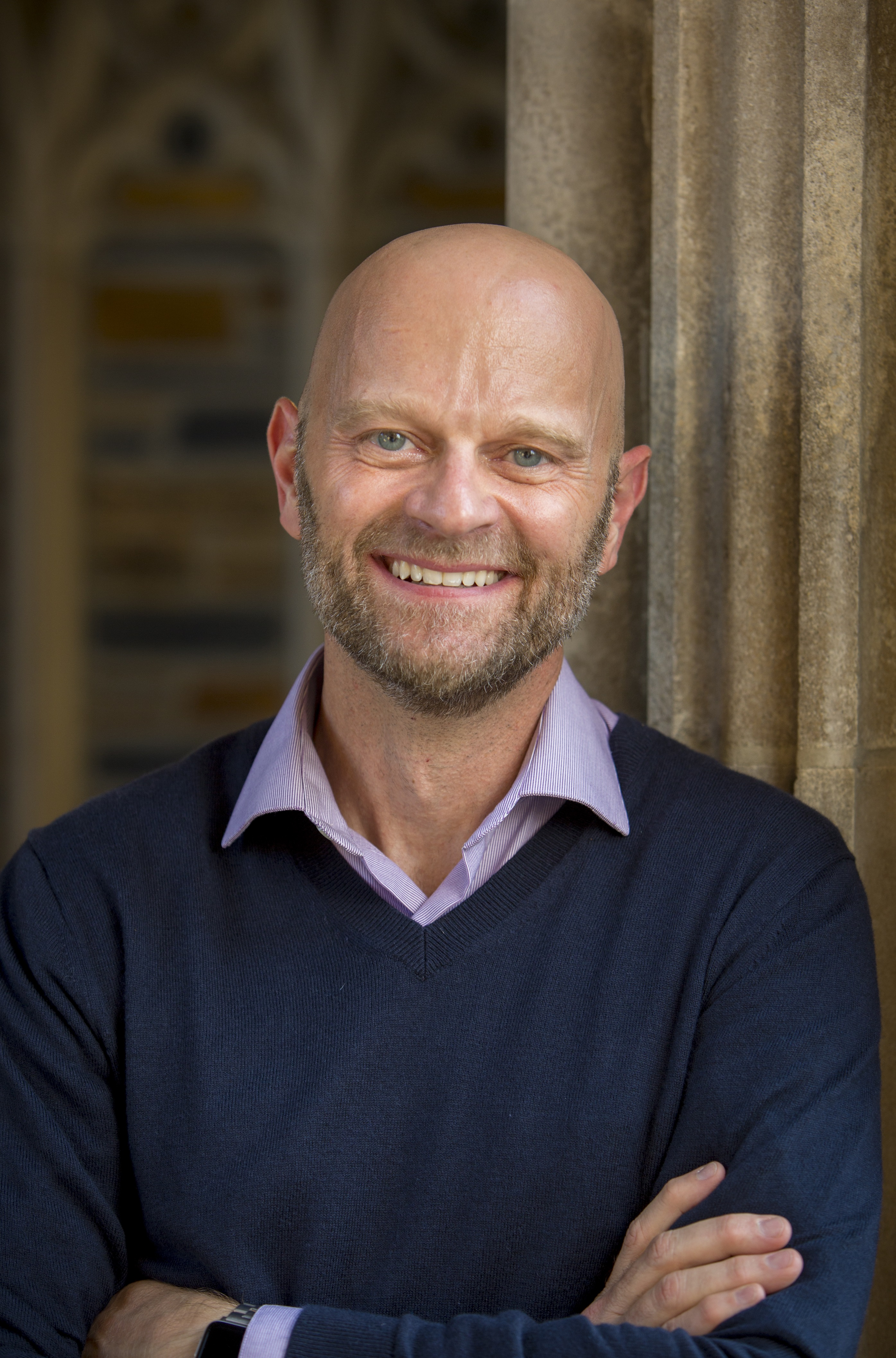

Brent A. Strawn is an American biblical scholar and theologian who is the D. Moody Smith Distinguished Professor of Old Testament at Duke Divinity School and Professor of Law at Duke University School of Law. His research focuses on the Old Testament/Hebrew Bible, particularly the Psalms, biblical law, ancient Near Eastern iconography, and Old Testament theology.

== Education ==
Strawn earned his Bachelor of Arts from Point Loma Nazarene University in 1992. He then went to Princeton Theological Seminary for graduate school, earning a Master of Divinity in 1995 and a Ph.D. in 2001.

== Career ==
Strawn began his academic career at Asbury Theological Seminary, where he taught for three years (1998-2001). He then joined the faculty at Emory University's Candler School of Theology, serving for eighteen years and holding the William Ragsdale Cannon Distinguished Professor of Old Testament.

In 2019, Strawn joined Duke Divinity School as Professor of Old Testament and was named D. Moody Smith Distinguished Professor of Old Testament in 2022. He received a secondary appointment at Duke University School of Law in January 2020. At Duke, he is a member of the Hebrew Bible track in the Ph.D. program in Religion, where he teaches and advises doctoral students in the Graduate School of Arts and Sciences. Strawn is also an affiliate faculty member in the Center for Jewish Studies.

== Research and publications ==
Strawn has authored over 300 articles, book chapters, and contributions to reference works. His books include:

- What Is Stronger than a Lion? Leonine Image and Metaphor in the Hebrew Bible and the Ancient Near East (2005)
- The Old Testament Is Dying: A Diagnosis and Recommended Treatment (2017)
- The Old Testament: A Concise Introduction (2019)
- Lies My Preacher Told Me: An Honest Look at the Old Testament (2021)
- Honest to God Preaching: Talking Sin, Suffering, and Violence (2021)
- The Incomparable God: Readings in Biblical Theology (2023)
- Unwavering Holiness: Pivotal Moments in the Book of Isaiah (2025)

He has edited or co-edited over 30 volumes, including The Oxford Encyclopedia of the Bible and Law (2015), which received the 2016 Dartmouth Medal from the American Library Association for most outstanding reference work, and The World around the Old Testament, with Bill T. Arnold, which won the Biblical Foundations Book Award in 2019. Strawn has also served as a translator and editorial board member for the Common English Bible (2011) and the New Revised Standard Version Updated Edition (2022).

Strawn’s scholarship is widely noted for integrating close literary and historical analysis of the Hebrew Bible with constructive theology and Christian ecclesial practice. Reviewers describe his work as resisting a sharp divide between critical scholarship and faith-based readings, instead treating interpretation as a disciplined form of theological attention. Strawn’s method has been described as a “dialectic of intellectual attentiveness and theological conviction,” using intense attention to textual detail in order to generate theological and ethical reflection rather than technical analysis alone.

Strawn’s most widely discussed work is The Old Testament Is Dying, in which he argues that the Old Testament has ceased to function for many Christians as in a formative, theological way, akin to a functioning language. Drawing on the U.S. Religions Knowledge Survey data, analyses of Christian hymnody and sermons, and liturgical resources like the lectionary, he describes many contemporary Christian circles as speaking little more than a “pidgin” version of Scripture shaped by selective reading, theological reduction, and cultural accommodation. He critiques New Atheism, ancient and modern Marcionism, and the prosperity gospel as reflecting defective biblical grammars and proposes renewal through pedagogical and liturgical retrieval, using the book of Deuteronomy as a biblical model illustrating second language acquisition.

== Personal life ==
An ordained elder in the North Georgia Conference of The United Methodist Church, Strawn regularly speaks and preaches at churches across the United States. He has appeared on CNN to discuss topics such as Easter celebrations, Pope Francis, and gun violence. At a 2017 TheoEd conference, Strawn spoke on reading the Bible as poetry, a recurring interest.

== Honors and grants ==
Strawn has received grants from the Association of Theological Schools, the Catholic Biblical Association, the Wabash Center, the Center for Hebraic Thought, and the National Endowment for the Humanities (NEH). In 2024, he was named a McDonald Distinguished Senior Fellow by the Center for the Study of Law and Religion at Emory University.

In 2023, Strawn was awarded, along with Drew Longacre, a three-year NEH grant to create the first critical, eclectic edition of the Hebrew text of Psalms 1-50. The project, titled “I Shall No Longer Want (Psalm 23:1): The Critical Edition of the Hebrew Psalter,” was temporarily terminated in April 2025, along with 1,500 other NEH-funded projects, before being restored in May 2026 by order of a federal judge. Strawn’s work on the Psalms has continued amid these disruptions in funding.
