= Jennifer Moberly =

Anglican cleric and theologian based in Durham, England

The Reverend Jennifer Moberly

Personal life
- Born: Jennifer Lynne McClure; 1962 (age 63–64) Indiana, United States
- Spouse: R. W. L. Moberly
- Children: 2

Religious life
- Religion: Christianity
- Denomination: Anglicanism
- Church: Church of England
- Ordination: 2001 (deacon); 2002 (priest)

Senior posting
- Based in: Diocese of Durham
- Previous post: Curate at the Church of St Mary Magdalene, Belmont; Chaplain at St Mary's College, Durham
- Residence: Durham, England

Academic background
- Education: Ball State University; Cranmer Hall, Durham; Durham University
- Thesis: The virtue of Bonhoeffer's ethics: a study of Dietrich Bonhoeffer's Ethics in relation to virtue ethics (2009)
- Doctoral advisors: Robert Song
- Influences: Dietrich Bonhoeffer

Academic work
- Discipline: Theology
- Institutions: Durham University; Cranmer Hall, St John's College, Durham
- Main interests: Ethics; spirituality

Jennifer Lynne Moberly (née McClure; born 1962) is a retired Anglican cleric in the Diocese of Durham and a theologian based at Durham University.

== Life and career ==
Moberly was born in 1962 to Bonnie Joan (née Smith, 1931–2025) and the Reverend Karl Eldridge McClure (1930–2017). Her father was a minister in the Southern Indiana Conference of the United Methodist Church. She studied at Ball State University in Muncie, Indiana, graduating with a Bachelor of Science (BSc) degree in 1984. Prior to her relocation to England and her career in the church, Moberly was a professional singer in Vienna for 12 years.

Moberly trained for ministry at Cranmer Hall, Durham, an evangelical Anglican theological college, from 1998 to 2001. She was ordained in the Church of England as a deacon in 2001 and as a priest in 2002. She has held several positions, including as a curate of the Church of St Mary Magdalene in Belmont, taking part in the church's 150th anniversary in 2007. She also served for some time as a chaplain at St Mary's College, Durham. During her tenure, Moberly and other chaplains of other colleges at Durham University condemned the "International Burn the Koran Day" proposed by Pastor terry Jones in 2010. She was also a tutor at Cranmer Hall, part of St John's College, Durham, where she taught on the topics of ethics and Christian spirituality from 2010 to 2022.

Moberly completed her PhD in 2009 at Durham University supervised by Robert Song. Her thesis was titled "The virtue of Bonhoeffer's ethics: a study of Dietrich Bonhoeffer's Ethics in relation to virtue ethics". It was subsequently published as a monograph by Pickwick Publications in 2013. Since completing her PhD, Moberly has remained as an academic at Durham and has supervised a number of doctoral and master's dissertations. Since 2022, she has been an honorary research fellow at Durham's Department of Theology and Religion.

She is currently based in Durham, England, and is married to the theologian R. W. L. Moberly, also an academic at Durham University. They have two children.

== Selected publications ==
- Moberly, Jennifer (2020). "Resilient unto death: resilience through the lens of Dietrich Bonhoeffer". In White, Nathan H.; Cook, Christopher C.H. (eds.). Biblical and Theological Visions of Resilience: Pastoral and Clinical Insights. Routledge New Critical Thinking in Religion, Theology and Biblical Studies. Abingdon, Oxfordshire: Routledge. pp. 167–180. doi:10.4324/9780429001185. ISBN 978-0-429-00118-5.
- Volpe, Medi Ann; Moberly, Jennifer (2016-06-03). ""Let your light so shine": Rowan Williams and Dietrich Bonhoeffer". In Kirkpatrick, Matthew D. (ed.). Engaging Bonhoeffer. Fortress Press. pp. 303–324. ISBN 978-1-5064-1037-1.
- Moberly, Jennifer (2013). The virtue of Bonhoeffer's ethics: a study of Dietrich Bonhoeffer's Ethics in relation to virtue ethics. Princeton Theological Monograph Series. Eugene, Oregon: Pickwick Publications. ISBN 978-1-61097-945-0.
- Moberly, Jennifer (2009). ""Felicity to the Original Text?" The Translation of Bonhoeffer's Ethics". Studies in Christian Ethics. 22 (3): 336–356. doi:10.1177/0953946809106236. ISSN 0953-9468.
