= George Herbert Moberly =

English priest and academic (1837 – 1895)

The Reverend Canon George Herbert Moberly
- Prebendary of Salisbury
- Church: Church of England
- In office: 1889 – 1895
- Previous posts: Curate, St Peter-in-the-East, Oxford; English chaplain, University of Bonn; Rector, Duntisbourne Rouse, Gloucestershire

Orders
- Ordination: 1860 (deacon); 1861 (priest)

Personal details
- Born: 3 January 1837 Winchester
- Died: 30 April 1895 (aged 58) Winchester
- Denomination: Anglicanism
- Parents: George Moberly (father)
- Spouse: Esther, née de Castro (m. 1870)
- Children: 5
- Education: Winchester College; Corpus Christi College, Oxford

George Herbert Moberly (3 January 1837 – 30 April 1895) was an English priest, academic, and author.

== Early life and education ==
The eldest son of George Moberly, later Bishop of Salisbury, and his wife Mary Ann, Moberly was born on 3 January 1837 in Winchester. From 1848, he was educated at Winchester College, where his father was headmaster at the time.

In 1855, aged 18, he matriculated at Corpus Christi College, Oxford, where he was a scholar and graduated with a BA in 1859. During his time at Oxford, he won the Stanhope essay prize in 1958, the Ellerton Theological Prize in 1860, and the Arnold Prize in 1861. He was awarded with an MA in 1861, but kept his scholarship until 1864, when he was elected a fellow of his college.

== Career ==
=== Joining the clergy ===
Like his father and many other members of his family, Moberly was ordained into the Church of England, first as a deacon in 1860 and then as a priest in 1861. He was a curate at St Peter-in-the-East in Oxford from 1860 to 1863 before moving to the parish of Assington, Suffolk, where he was based from 1864 to 1865.

=== Academic and senior postings ===
Moberly held the fellowship at Corpus Christi College from 1864 until 1870. From 1869 to 1871 was a tutor, chaplain, and lecturer in law and modern history, at the University of Bonn.

Moberly returned to England in 1871 to take up the post of Rector of Duntisbourne Rouse, Gloucestershire, a benefice he held until 1880. He then spent five years as Principal of Lichfield Theological College and as a prebendary of Lichfield Cathedral, and from 1878 was also Master of St Nicholas Hospital, Salisbury. In 1887 he was appointed as Rector of Monkton Farleigh, in Wiltshire. From 1889 until his death in 1895, he was also a prebendary of Salisbury.

== Personal life and death ==
In 1870, Moberly married Esther de Castro, with whom he had two sons and three daughters. He died at Cintra House, Winchester, on 30 April 1895.

== Selected publications ==
- Life and Immortality brought to light by the Gospel, an essay which obtained the Ellerton Theological Prize in the University of Oxford, 1860 (Oxford: J. Vincent, 1860)
- The Christians in Rome, during the first three centuries, Arnold Prize Essay; (1861)
- Sacrifice in the Eucharist: a Conversation (1875)
- Venerabilis Baedae Historia Ecclesiastica Gentis Anglorum, cura Georgii H. Moberly, A.M. (1881)
- Pastor's Humility: An Ordination Sermon Preached in Lichfield Cathedral (1881)
- Scriptural Argument Against the Proposed Change in Our Marriage Laws: A Letter to the Lord Bishop of Lichfield (with William Dalrymple Maclagan, 1883)
- Life of William of Wykeham: Sometime Bishop of Winchester (1887)
- The Fifteenth Century Cartulary of St. Nicholas' Hospital, Salisbury, With Other Records (with Christopher Wordsworth, 1902)
