= Theology (journal) =

- Discipline: Theology
- Language: English

Publication details
- History: 1920-present
- Publisher: The Society for the Promotion of Christian Knowledge in association with SAGE Publications
- Frequency: Bimonthly

Standard abbreviations
- ISO 4: Theology

Indexing
- ISSN: 0040-571X (print); 2044-2696 (web)
- OCLC no.: 1767420

Links
- Journal homepage; Online content 1920 (Vol. 1) - present; Journal page at society site

Theology different from Theology. Here, it is a peer-reviewed academic journal published by the Society for the Promotion of Christian Knowledge. Since 2010, SAGE Publications have managed the online publication and distribution of the journal. It covers current work in fields related to contemporary Christian thought and practice, including historical, systematic, and pastoral theology, as well as biblical studies, history, philosophy, and ethics.

The journal was edited by E. G. Selwyn from July 1920 through December 1933; by Spencer Carpenter from January 1934 through December 1938, by Alec R. Vidler from January 1939 through December 1964, and by Gordon R. Dunstan from January 1965 through December 1975. In January 1976, as the journal changed over from monthly to bimonthly publication, the editorship was taken over by John Drury, David Jenkins and James Mark. Ann Loades was editor from 1991 to 1997. The current editor-in-chief is Stephen J. Plant.

Volume numbers cover half-years from vol. 1 (July–December 1920) to vol. 45 (July–December 1942); from vol. 46 (January–December 1943) each volume covers one calendar year.

== Abstracting and indexing ==
Theology is abstracted and indexed in ProQuest and Religious & Theological Abstracts.
