= John Moberly (cricketer) =

English cricketer

- Born: John Cornelius Moberly; 22 April 22 April 1848; Winchester, Hampshire, England
- Died: 29 January 1928 (aged 79); Southampton, Hampshire, England
- Education: Winchester College
- Alma mater: New College, Oxford
- Occupations: Solicitor; official receiver; cricket administrator
- Spouse: Caroline Hunter (m. 1872)
- Children: 4
- Father: George Moberly
- Cricket career

Cricket information
- Batting: Right-handed
- Bowling: Right-arm medium

Domestic team information
- Years: Team
- 1877: Hampshire

Career statistics
Competition	First-class
Matches	1
Runs scored	31
Batting average	15.50
100s/50s	–/–
Top score	27
Catches/stumpings	–/–
- Source: Cricinfo, 19 February 2010

John Cornelius Moberly (22 April 1848 – 29 January 1928) was an English first-class cricketer, cricket administrator, and solicitor.

== Early life and education ==
The fourth son of the cleric George Moberly, he was born at Winchester in April 1848. He was educated at Winchester College from 1858 to 1866 before matriculating at New College, Oxford in 1866. He earned a BA in 1869, followed by an MA in 1873.

== Cricket ==
As a student, Moberly played for Winchester College's cricket team. In his adulthood, he made a single appearance in first-class cricket for Hampshire against Derbyshire at Derby in 1877. Batting twice in the match, he was dismissed for 27 runs in Hampshire's first innings by Amos Hind, while in their second innings he was dismissed for 4 runs by William Hickton. Although he did bowl in first-class cricket, Wisden described him as "a steady and painstaking bowler, varying the pitch considerably, and was sometimes very successful". He later served Hampshire County Cricket Club in an administrative capacity, serving for many years as its treasurer and chairman of committee. From 1913 to 1918, he served as its president.

== Legal career ==
After graduating from Oxford, Moberly practiced as a solicitor in Alresford and later in Southampton. He was also an official receiver in bankruptcy. He co-founded the Moberly & Wharton practice with his business partner, John Henry Turner Wharton.

Moberly was appointed a Land Tax commissioner for the "County of Southampton" in 1886.

== Personal life and death ==
Moberly married his wife, Caroline (née Hunter) in 1872. Together, they had 2 sons and 2 daughters.

He died at Southampton on 29 January 1928.

His nephew, Robert Awdry, son of his sister Margaret Helen, also played first-class cricket.
