= George Moberly =

English Anglican bishop (1803–1885)

The Right Reverend George Moberly
- Bishop of Salisbury
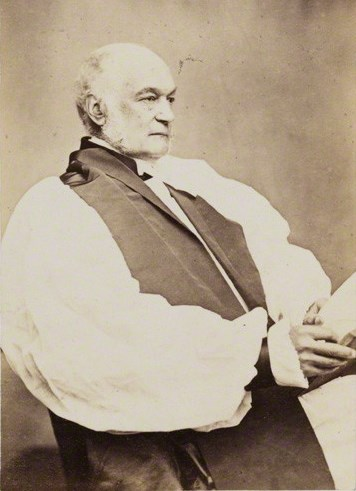
- Moberly in 1870
- Church: Church of England
- Diocese: Diocese of Salisbury
- In office: 1869–1885
- Predecessor: Walter Kerr Hamilton
- Successor: John Wordsworth
- Previous posts: Rector of St Mary's Church, Brighstone; Canon of Chester Cathedral

Orders
- Ordination: 21 December 1828 by Charles Lloyd

Personal details
- Born: 10 October 1803 Saint Petersburg, Russian Empire
- Died: 6 July 1885 (aged 81) Salisbury, England
- Denomination: Anglican
- Spouse: Mary Anne Crokat (m. 1834)
- Children: George, Robert, Charlotte, John, and 11 others
- Education: Winchester College
- Alma mater: Balliol College, Oxford (MA)

George Moberly (10 October 1803 – 6 July 1885) was an English cleric who was headmaster of Winchester College, and then served as Bishop of Salisbury from 1869 until his death.

== Life ==
George Moberly was born on 10 October 1803 in St Petersburg, Russian Empire in 1803, the seventh son of Edward Moberly, a merchant, and his wife, Sarah Cayley. He had seven brothers and three sisters; one of his brothers was John Moberly, a captain in the Royal Navy. The Moberly family later returned to England, Edward and Sarah's home country, due to the outbreak of the Anglo-Russian War.

George Moberly was educated at Winchester College before matriculating at Balliol College, Oxford in 1822. He graduated with a B.A. in 1825, followed by an M.A. in 1828. He was a Fellow of Balliol from 1826 to 1834. He was ordained deacon in 1826, and priest in 1828.

Moberly married Mary Anne Crokat on 22 December 1834 at South Cadbury, Somerset. After his academic career he became headmaster of Winchester in 1835.

This post Moberly resigned in 1866, and retired to the Rectory of St. Mary's Church, Brighstone, Isle of Wight, he was also a Canon of Chester Cathedral. The Prime Minister William Ewart Gladstone, however, in 1869 called him to be Bishop of Salisbury, in which see he kept up the traditions of his predecessors, Bishops Hamilton and Denison, his chief addition being the summoning of a diocesan synod.

Though Moberly left Oxford at the beginning of the Oxford Movement, he fell under its influence: the more so that at Winchester he formed a most intimate friendship with Keble, spending several weeks every year at Otterbourne, the next parish to Hursley.

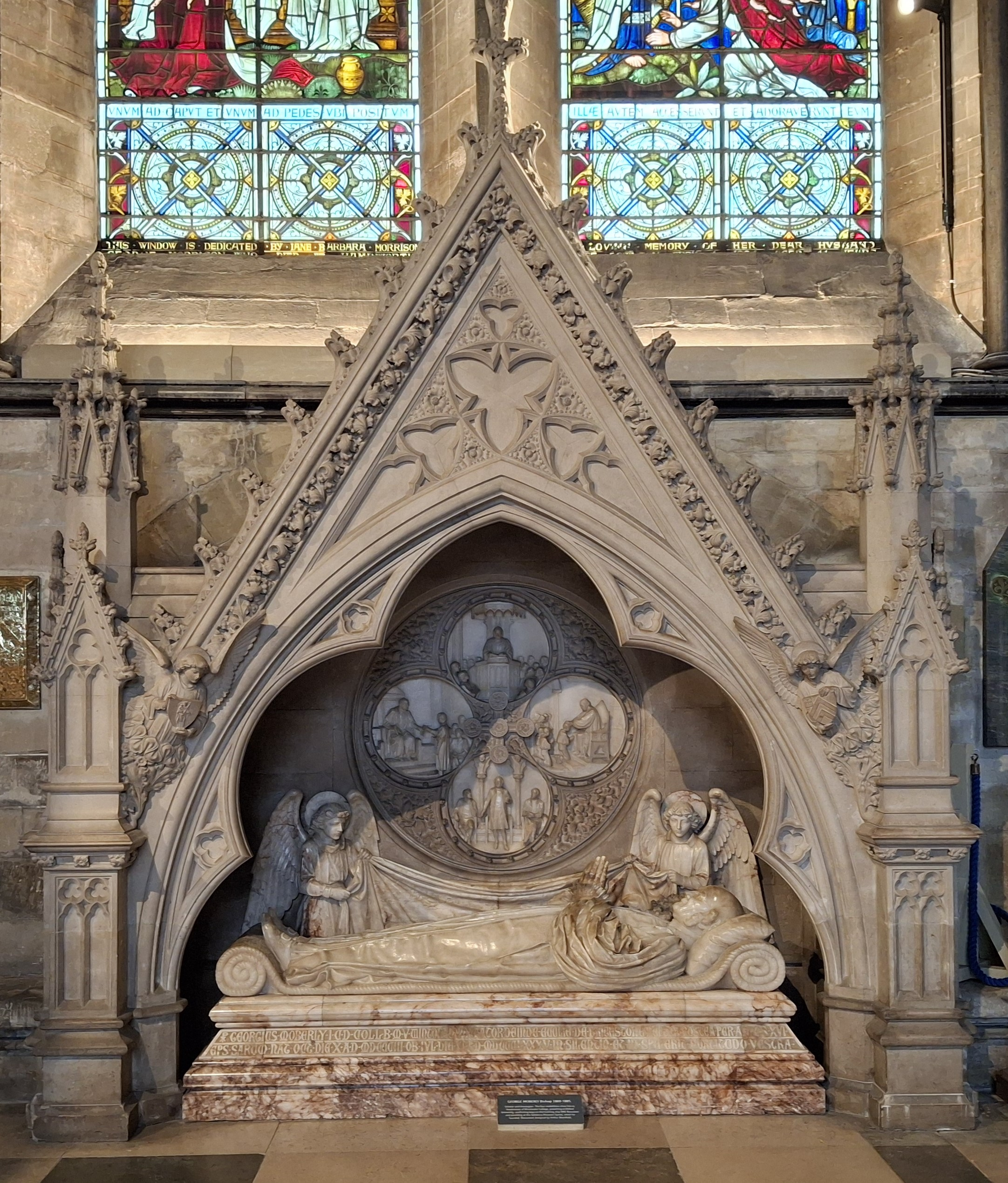
George Moberly Monument in Salisbury Cathedral designed by Arthur Blomfield.

Moberly, however, retained his independence of thought, and in 1872 he astonished his High Church friends by joining in the movement for the disuse of the damnatory clauses in the Athanasian Creed. His chief contribution to theology is his Bampton Lectures of 1868, on The Administration of the Holy Spirit in the Body of Christ. He died on 6 July 1885.

== Family ==
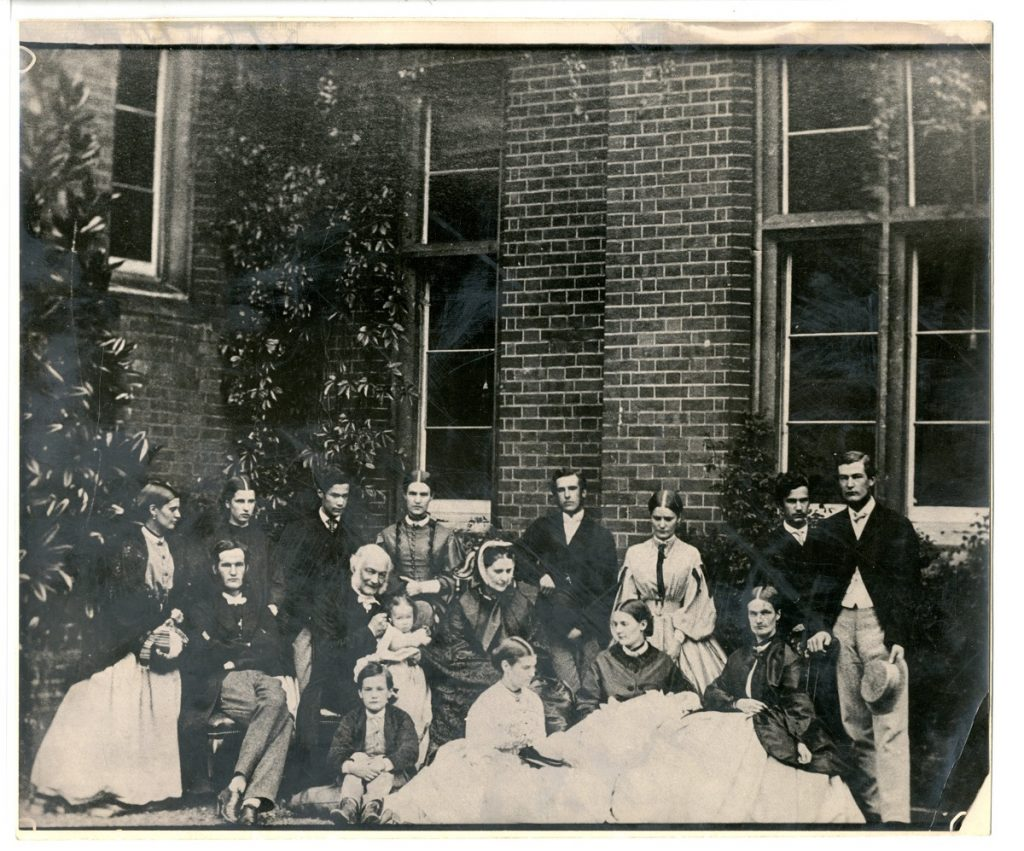
The Moberly family on the ground of Winchester College in 1866. Photo held by the Hampshire Archives Trust.

Moberly married in 1834 Mary Anne Crokat, daughter of Thomas Crokat of Leghorn. There were 15 children of the marriage, eight daughters and seven sons. Five sons and seven daughters survived their father. The children included:

- Alice Arbuthnot Moberly (1835–1911)
- George Herbert Moberly (1837–1895), the eldest son.
- Mary Louisa Moberly (1838–1859), the third child, married George Ridding.
- Edith Emily Moberly (1839–1901)
- Arthur Moberly (1840–1858), the second son, died at the age of 18.
- Dora Frances Moberly (1842–1926), married Rev. Charles Martin. William Keble Martin, the botanical illustrator, was one of their sons.
- Elspeth Catherine Moberly (1843–1938), also known as Kitty or Kate
- Frances Emily Moberly (1844–1921), married William Awdry.
- Robert Campbell Moberly (1845–1903), the third son, was a theologian and a member of both Queen Victoria and Edward VII's Ecclesiastical Household.
- Charlotte Anne Moberly (1846–1937), the tenth child, became the first principal of St Hugh's College, Oxford, and was involved in the Moberly–Jourdain incident.
- John Cornelius Moberly (1848–1928), the fourth son, was solicitor and first-class cricketer.
- Edward Hugh Moberly (1849–1922), the fifth son, was a cleric turned amateur conductor. He founded a women's orchestra, which gave many concerts across England. His eldest daughter was the artist Sylvia Holland.
- Walter Allan Moberly (1851–1905), the sixth son, was Vicar of St. Philip’s and St. Bartholomew’s in Sydenham; the Church of the Ascension, Blackheath; Hon. Canon of Rochester; and Rural Dean of Lewisham. He was widowed by his wife Mary, with whom he had a daughter, Mildred Agnes Moberly.
- Margaret Helen Moberly (1852–1939), married Charles Henry Awdry. One of their children was Robert Awdry.
- Selwyn William Moberly (1854–1871)

His great-grandson, Dick Milford, a grandson of his daughter Kitty, was a clergyman and educator who was involved in the founding of Oxfam.

== Published writings ==
=== Essays ===
- A few remarks on the proposed admission of dissenters into the University of Oxford. Oxford: J. H. Parker and J. G. & F. Rivington. 1834.
- The sayings of the great Forty Days, between the Resurrection and Ascension, regarded as the outlines of the kingdom of God. London: Francis & John Rivington. 1846.
- The law of the love of God: an essay on the commandments of the first table of the Decalogue. Winchester: David Nutt. 1854.
- The epistles of St. Paul to the Galatians, Ephesians, Philippians, and Colossians. With Alford, Henry; Humphry, William G.; and Ellicott, Charles J. London: Parker, Son, and Bourn. 1861.

=== Sermons ===
- Things Indifferent: A Sermon on I Corinthians X. 23. Oxford and London: J. H. Parker and J. G. & F. Rivington. 1835.
- The Fields White Unto the Harvest: A Sermon Preached in Winchester Cathedral. Winchester: Jacob & Johnson. 1837.
- Sermons, preached at Winchester College. London: Francis & John Rivington. 1844.
- Sermons preached at Winchester College: Second Series. London and Winchester: Francis & John Rivington and David Nutt. 1848.
- Sermons on the Beatitudes. Oxford and London: J. H. and Jas. Parker. 1861.
- The administration of the Holy Spirit in the body of Christ: eight lectures preached before the University of Oxford, in the year 1868. Oxford and London: James Parker and Co. 1868.
- Brightstone Sermons. London, Oxford, and Cambridge: Rivingtons. 1869.
- Parochial Sermons. London: Rivingtons. 1886. (posthumous publication with preface by his eldest son, George Herbert Moberly)

Academic offices
Preceded by David Williams	Headmaster of Winchester College; 1835-1866	Succeeded by George Ridding
Church of England titles
Preceded by Walter Hamilton Kerr Hamilton	Bishop of Salisbury; 1869–1885	Succeeded by John Wordsworth
