= Frank Moberly =

Canadian engineer

Frank Moberly was a Canadian engineer.

Moberly was born at Barrie, Canada West on 19 July 1845. Frank was the youngest son of Capt. John Moberly. Like his brothers Walter and Clarence, Frank also became a Civil Engineer.

Moberly took charge of the government Survey under Sandford Fleming, from Winnipeg to the Kootenay Plains, at the headwaters of the Athabaska in the Rocky Mountains. As a member of the Canadian Pacific Survey in June 1871 he led a party from the Red River to the Yellowhead Pass, accompanied by photographer Charles Horetzky.

According to his brother Henry, Frank became an authority on mountain passes. Frank Moberly engaged in a number of transcontinental railway and exploration surveys both in Canada, from Newfoundland to Vancouver Island and in the United States to California.

Both his wives, Georgina Agnes McIntyre and Mary Violet McIntyre, were daughters of John McIntyre, Hudson Bay Company officer in charge and factor at Fort William, Ontario, 1855-1877. At Thunder Bay, Ontario, he was elected a councillor of the Municipality of Shuniah 1877/78 for Paipoonge township, and served as reeve of the Municipality of Neebing from November 1883 to June 1884.

He died 13 July 1928 at Barrie, Ontario.
