= Horetzky =

Horetzky is a surname. Notable people with the surname include:

- Charles Horetzky (1838–1900), Canadian surveyor and photographer, son of Felix
- Felix Horetzky (1796–1870), Polish guitarist and composer
