= Walter Moberly Elementary School =

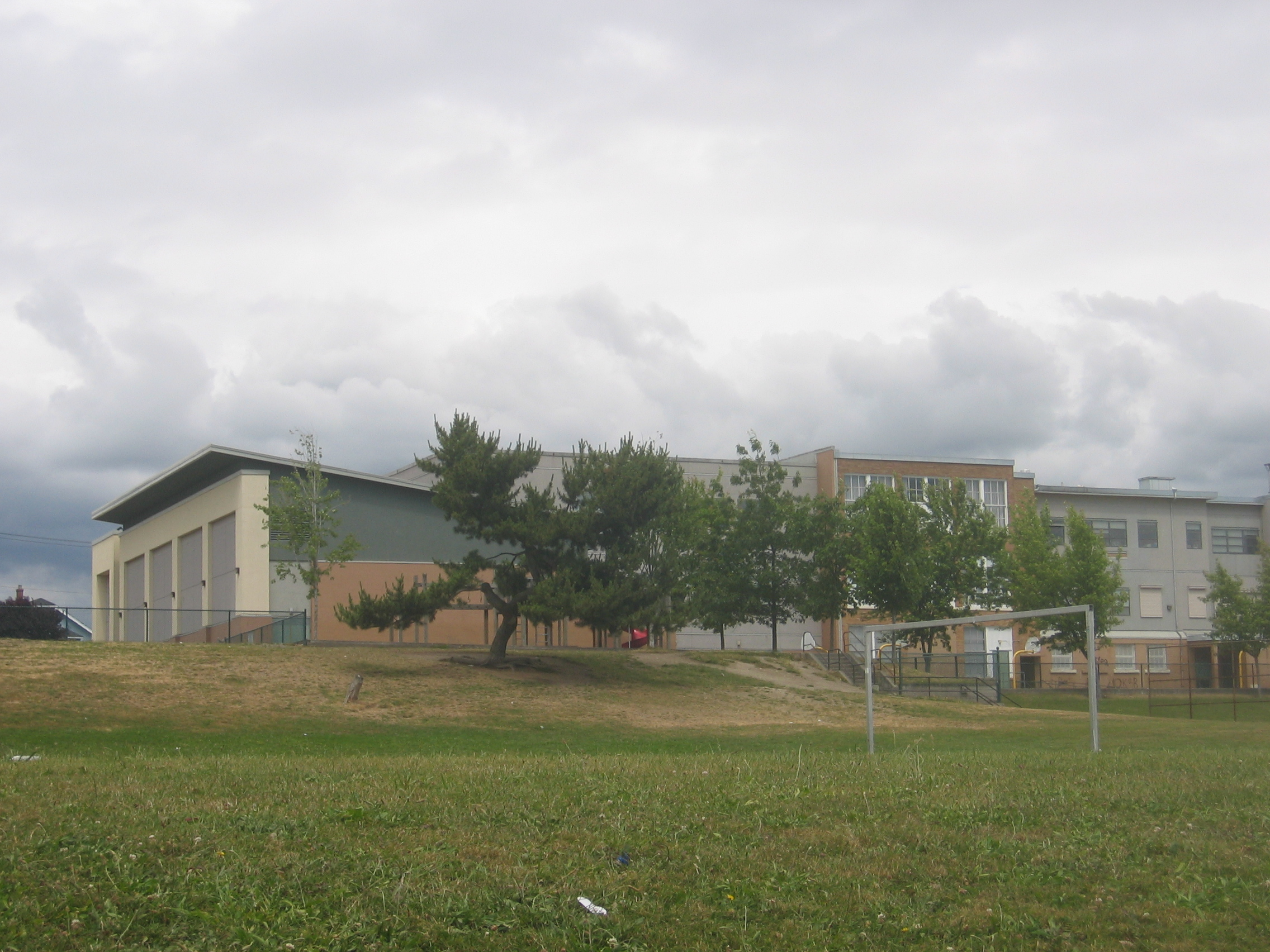

Location
- 1000 East 59th Avenue; Vancouver, British Columbia, V5X 1Y7; Canada
- 49.21603°N 123.08413°W

Information
- School type: Public, Elementary school
- School board: School District 39 Vancouver
- Superintendent: Ms.Hoffman
- School number: 3939056
- Director: Shaan Niger (Director of Instruction)
- Principal: Mike Vulgaris
- Grades: K-7
- Enrollment: 640 (September 2007)
- Colour: green
- Mascot: Mustang
- Website: moberly.vsb.bc.ca

Walter Moberly Elementary School is a public elementary school in Vancouver, British Columbia and part of School District 39 Vancouver. The school has grades from Kindergarten through Grade 7. The school was built in 1912.

== History ==
Walter Moberly Elementary School was first constructed in 1912 at its current site at Khalsa Diwan Rd and East 59th Avenue. The school was named after Walter Moberly, an engineer and surveyor for the Canadian Pacific Survey.

In 1945, the school burned down. It was rebuilt the following year in 1946. An addition of a second gymnasium, 10 classrooms and offices were added to the west side of Moberly in 1999.

== Song ==
Moberly has brought us together,
Yes, Moberly is why we are here,
And when we work in harmony
We come together as one.

This is an open invitation,
For every one of you,
To be a part of this celebration,
That's why we share the news. (Chorus)

We know the magic is within us,
And the power too,
Reach for the stars and try your best now.
It's really up to you..... (Chorus)
