= Pratten =

Pratten is a surname, and may refer to:

- Bert Pratten (1892–1979), Australian cricketer
- Catharina Pratten (1824–1895), German/English guitarist & composer
- Frederick Pratten (cricketer) (1904–1967), English cricketer
- Graham Pratten (1899–1977), Australian politician
- Herbert Pratten (1865–1928), Australian politician
- Robert Pratten, consultant
- Robert Sidney Pratten (1824–1868), English flautist

== Other ==
- Pratten, Queensland, a town in Queensland, Australia
- Prattens, a company from Midsomer Norton, Somerset, that made pre-fabricated classrooms and other buildings
