= John Moberly =

John Moberly may refer to:

- John Moberly (Royal Navy officer) (1788–1848), British Royal Navy captain
- John Moberly (cricketer) (1848–1928), English cricketer, cricket administrator and solicitor
- Sir John Moberly (diplomat) (1925–2004), British diplomat

== See also ==
- John Mobberly (c. 1844–1865), Confederate guerrilla during the American Civil War
- John Mobley (born 1973), American football player
- John Mobley Jr., American college basketball player
