= Charles Horetzky =

Canadian surveyor and photographer

- Born: 20 July 1838; Edinburgh, Scotland
- Died: 30 April 1900 (aged 61); Toronto, Canada
- Occupations: Canadian surveyor, photographer, author, and sanitary engineer
- Known for: Canadian photographer
- Spouse: Mary Julia Ryan (m. 1865)
- Father: Felix Horetzky

Charles George Horetzky or Horetsky (20 July 1838 – 30 April 1900) was a Canadian surveyor and photographer noted for his work in Western Canada as a member of the Canadian Pacific Survey under Sir Sandford Fleming and Frank Moberly.

== Early life ==
Horetzky was born to Felix Horetzky and Sophia Roberton on July 20, 1838 in Edinburgh, Scotland. He was the only son and child of the Horetzky family.

In 1853, after his incomplete education at Blair's College and another college in Belgium, he left Scotland for the Australian gold-fields.

== Early career and marriage ==
In 1858, he traveled to the Canadas where he was engaged by the Hudson's Bay Company to settle as a clerk at Fort William on the Ottawa River. In 1864, his position was promoted to an accountant at Moose Factory, one of the Hudson's Bay Company's post. Shortly after, he was married to Mary Julia Ryan and went on to have two sons and a daughter. In August 1869, Horetzky was assigned the same position as an accountant at Upper Fort Garry, but was short lived due to the Red River Rebellion, so he was given permission to travel back. While in Ottawa, He faced many difficulties from the Hudson's Bay Company with his overdrawn account and with the company's officials for his uncompromising attitude that his engagement was terminated in April, 1870. He tried an appeal to the company to reverse their decision, but was ultimately rejected.

== Photographing ==
Following these events, Horetzky and his family turned to Charles Tupper, a friend of his. He constantly recommended Horetzky to Sandford Fleming for his abilities to which Horetzky was eventually hired as a photographer for the future surveys conducted on the lesser known parts of the Northwest Territories and British Columbia.

During the fall and winter of 1871, Horetzky was assigned to, and took many decent views of the country between the Red River and Yellowhead Pass in the Rocky Mountains and returned back to Ottawa. Fleming was pleased to his results and asked him to guide and accompany him through the Yellowhead pass, to which Horetzky agreed. And so they, along with Flemling's son and a two authors traveled from Upper Fort Garry to Fort Edmonton. Horetzky and one of the authors, John Macoun, parted from the group to survey a more northern route through the Peace River Country.

== Author and sanitary engineering ==
In March, 1873, Horetzky went on to publish many articles from his experiences in the northern route in the Ottawa Daily Citizen along with a short pamphlet, The north-west of Canada. In his later years, Horetzky became a sanitary engineer and supervised many projects from the 1880s to the 1890s. He made way for many sewage systems such as the one at the Ontario Agriculture College.

== Works ==
- Charles Horetzky (1874). Canada on the Pacific: Being an Account of a Journey From Edmonton to the Pacific by the Peace River Valley and of A Winter Voyage along the Western Coast of the Dominion with Remarks on the Physical Features of the Pacific Railway Route and Notices of the Indian Tribes of British Columbia. Montreal: Dawson Brothers.
- Charles Horetzky (1880). Some Startling Facts Relating to the Canadian Pacific Railway and the North-West Lands: Also a Brief Discussion Regarding the Route, the Western Terminus and the Lands Available for Settlement. Ottawa: Free Press.
