= Franceville, Ontario =

Coordinates: 44.942417°N 79.897072°W

Location in Canada

Franceville is former resort on Mainland in Georgian Bay, Ontario, Canada. It is located near the south-West shore of Georgian Bay, about 8 miles north of Honey Harbour. There is no road access to Franceville, nor has there ever been, although it is within a few miles of a major highway.

The France Family emigrated from Yorkshire, England in 1887 to gain employment at a resort hotel on Lake Ontario. Wilfred France Senior being, among other things a self-employed butcher. Their 2 adult sons George and Wilfred 2 (Billy) became fisherman in Burlington, Ontario, and used their boat to explore the opportunities in the logging and lumber industries which had developed around the Musquash River, which flowed into Georgian Bay. The 50+ acres of land was deeded to the France family through the British "Homestead Act" whereby British immigrants were given or sold land by the Crown In the late 17th century.

With parents now in the hotel business, and the only accommodation available in the area "Rosin House" closing, the boys proposed to the parents that they could come to the area and build their own hotel. With a very ready supply of lumber and labour they opened the first accommodation, known as "Mrs. France's Boarding House" in 1890. For years the building was continually enlarged until it became 'France House" in about 1910. The Frances ran several boats regularly to both Honey Harbour and Penetanguishene for supplies, passengers and mail. The Federal Government declared that to have mail addressed to the location it would have to have a name, so the name of the destination became "Franceville Ontario via Penetanguishene" and as a postal destination it would be included on Federal maps and charts.

Mail to that address was picked up from the train in Penetangueshene and sorted by the appointed "Postmaster" Billy France who then took it by boat to his parents' hotel and to any cottagers who requested the service.

By 1914, with business brisk, Billy and wife Fanny began construction of a 2nd hotel on the lands, called 'Osborne House', named after Fanny's family. At the time they were still living in "the Cottage". With the advent of WW1 in 1914 all three of Billy's boys went to enlist for military service. Wilfred A. France, The youngest, was sent back (as was the practice for rural families) to "care for the family lands" which he did as best he could for the remainder of his life.

In 1917 after only one season with two hotels operating at Franceville, Wilfred Sr.'s hotel "France House' (by then re-named 'Franceville House') burned to the ground. The two older boys, after returning from service, eventually took employment in nearby cities. Susanna, Wilfred senior's wife, died in 1919 while the seniors were living with Billy and Fanny in Osborne House. In 1920, famous painter A. Y. Jackson spent two months here, and produced a large number of sketches.

Wilfred Sr., then 78 years of age, began almost immediately to build a third hotel mostly by himself and his son George Peter France. The project was completed by 1928 just in time for the Great Depression when all business at the resort ground to a halt. During those difficult years some family members returned to visit and built two cottages of their own. In 1932 Wilfred A. France married Winnifred Lewis who had come to work in the Osborne House Hotel. Wilfred France Senior died at Franceville in 1934 and Wilfred Jr. (Billy) in 1936. All are interred at the St. James on-the-Lines in Penetangueshene Ontario.

As of 2016 all residents of "Franceville" are descendants of Wilfred and Susanna, having occupied the land since 1887.
