= Frenzel =

- Pronunciation: Frenzel

Origin
- Origin: Rhineland
- Meaning: patronymic name meaning son of Franciscus
- Region of origin: German

Other names
- Variant forms: Frentzel, Frencel, Frencl

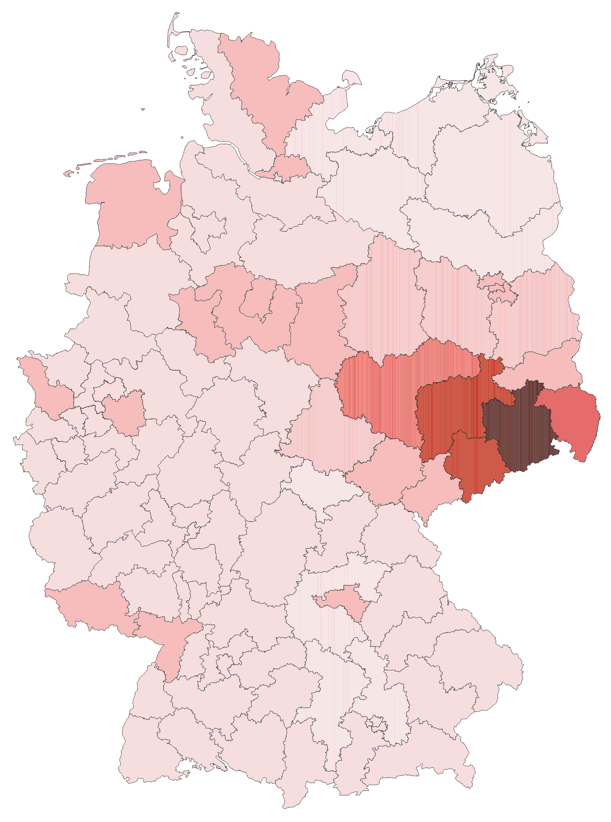
Map showing distribution and prevalence of the name in Germany

Frenzel is a German surname that originated in the Rhineland, and today is prevalent among Volga Germans and in east-central Germany, focused on Dresden. It is a patronymic name meaning son of Franciscus. Notable people with the surname include:

- Alfred Frenzel (1899–1968), Czech spy of the Cold War era
- Bill Frenzel (1947–2014), American politician
- Eric Frenzel (born 1988), German skier
- Johannes Frenzel (1858–1897), German biologist
- Karl Frenzel (1911–1996), German Nazi SS-Oberscharführer
- Michael Frenzel (born 1947), German business executive
- Oskar Frenzel (1855–1915), German animal and landscape painter
- Salomon Frenzel von Friedenthal (1560/64–1600), Silesian writer

== See also ==
- Curt Frenzel Stadium
