= Franceville (disambiguation) =

Franceville is a place-name that may refer to:

- Franceville, Gabon
- Franceville, New Hebrides, a former name for Port Vila, Vanuatu
- Franceville, Ontario, a community in Georgian Bay
- France-Ville, a fictional settlement in Oregon Territory, in The Begum's Fortune by Jules Verne

== See also ==
- Merville-Franceville-Plage, Normandy, France
