= 54 Welbeck Street =

City of Westminster, Greater London, W1G

Coordinates: 51°31′03″N 0°08′58″W

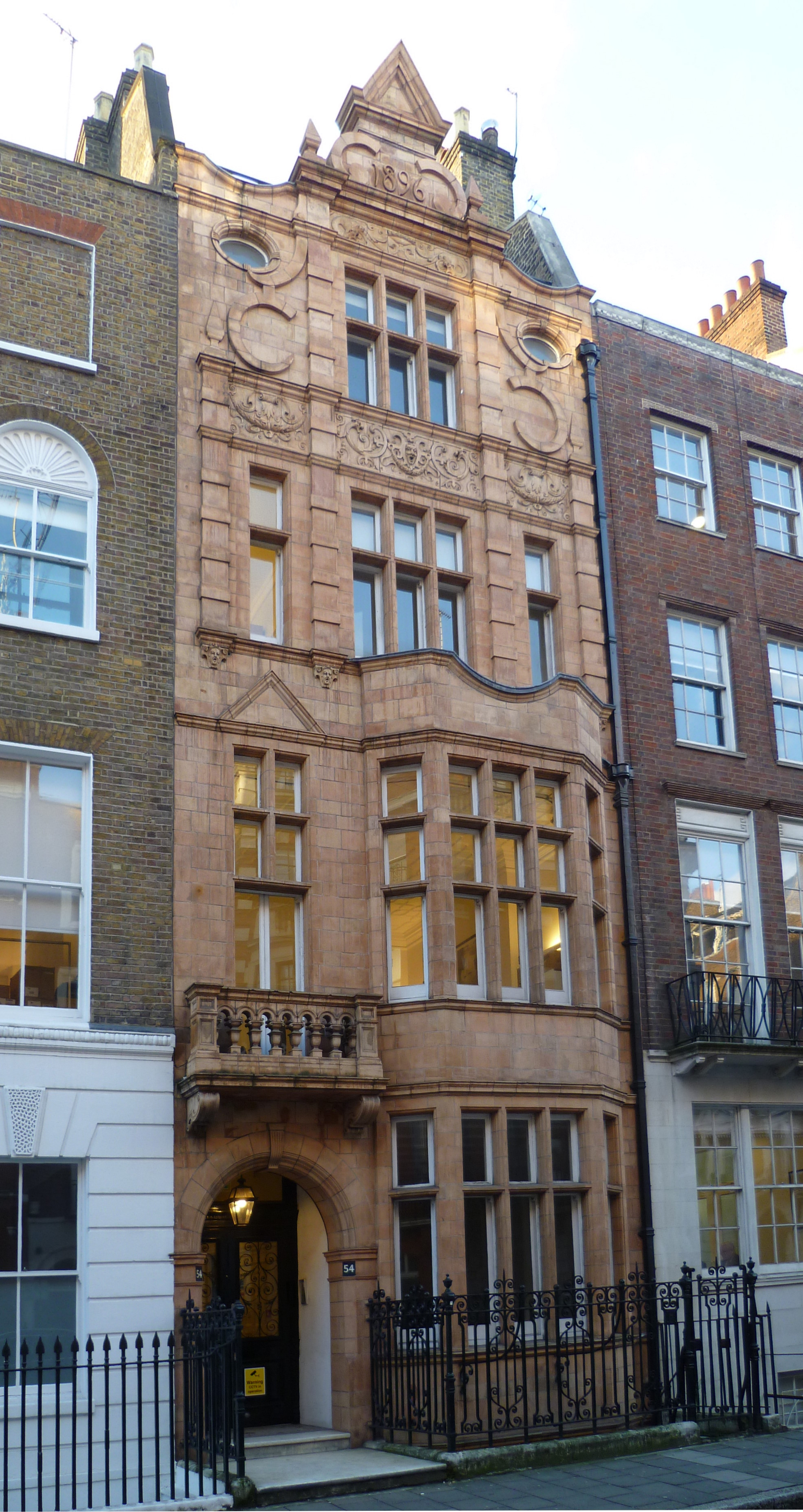
54 Welbeck Street

54 Welbeck Street is a grade II listed town house in Welbeck Street, in the City of Westminster, London. The house is dated 1896 and in free style pink terracotta "Jacobethan".
