= Horyszów =

- Village
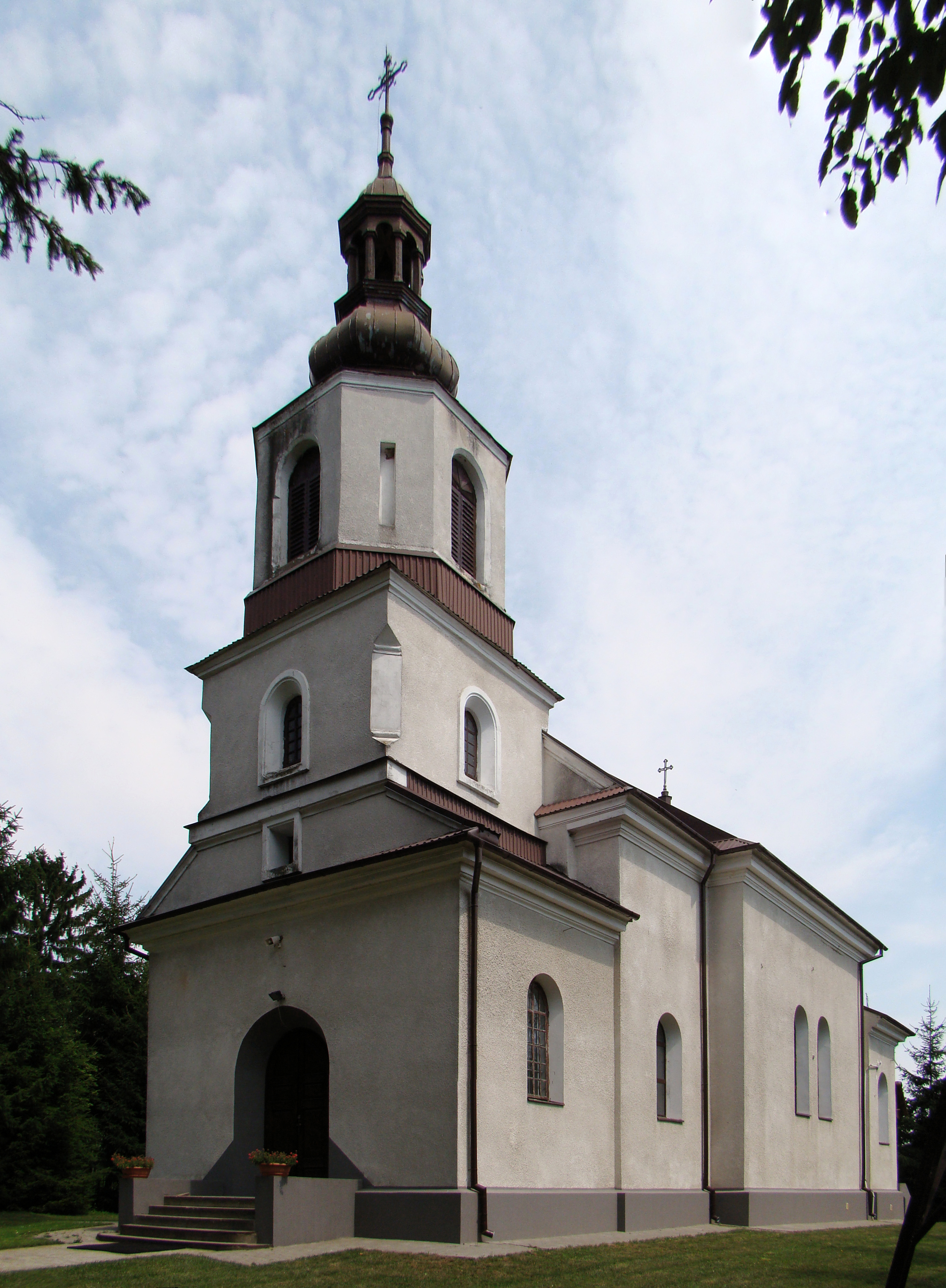
- Church of the Transfiguration

- Location within Poland
- Coordinates: 50°44′53″N 23°36′15″E
- Country: Poland
- Voivodeship: Lublin
- County: Zamość
- Gmina: Miączyn
- Population (approx.): 650

Horyszów [xɔˈrɨʂuf] (formerly Horyszów Ruski) is a village in the administrative district of Gmina Miączyn, within Zamość County, Lublin Voivodeship, in eastern Poland.

== Notable people ==
- David Hilchen (1561–1610), Renaissance humanist and politician from Riga, died in Horyszów.
- Felix Horetzky (1796–1870), a Polish composer and guitarist, was born here.
