= St. James on-the-Lines =

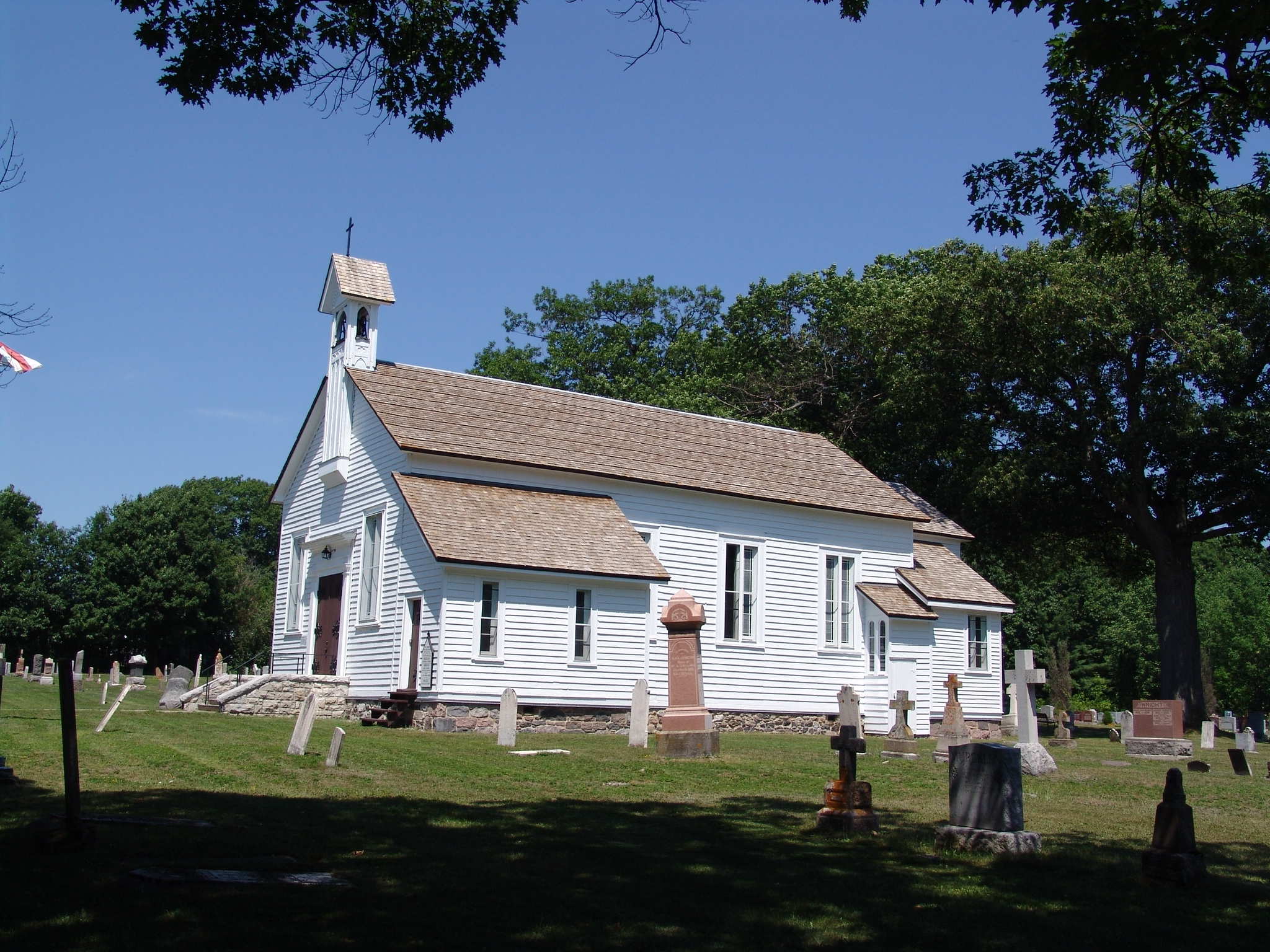
- St. James on-the-Lines
- 44°47′13″N 79°55′34″W
- Location: Penetanguishene, Ontario
- Country: Canada
- Denomination: Anglican

History
- Status: Parish church

Architecture
- Functional status: Active
- Heritage designation: Ontario Heritage Trust
- Designated: Jan. 20 1981
- Style: Greek Revival with Gothic Revival elements
- Groundbreaking: 1836
- Completed: 1840

Administration
- Diocese: Anglican Diocese of Toronto
- Parish: Penetanguishene

St. James on-the-Lines (often written as St. James-on-the-Lines or St. James On-the-Lines) is a historic Anglican garrison church in Penetanguishene, Ontario. The church is still in use today serving as the Anglican parish church in Penetanguishene for services from Easter to Thanksgiving. The church is protected by a heritage conservation easement under the Ontario Heritage Act. There are two suggested origins for its full name. The first suggestion comes from its location on the lines of communication or road from the former military establishment at Penetanguishene to the south. The second possible meaning is from the old Victorian military usage of Lines for the rows of tents or buildings in a military camp. The church was constructed close to the original military establishment buildings which lined the road.

== History ==
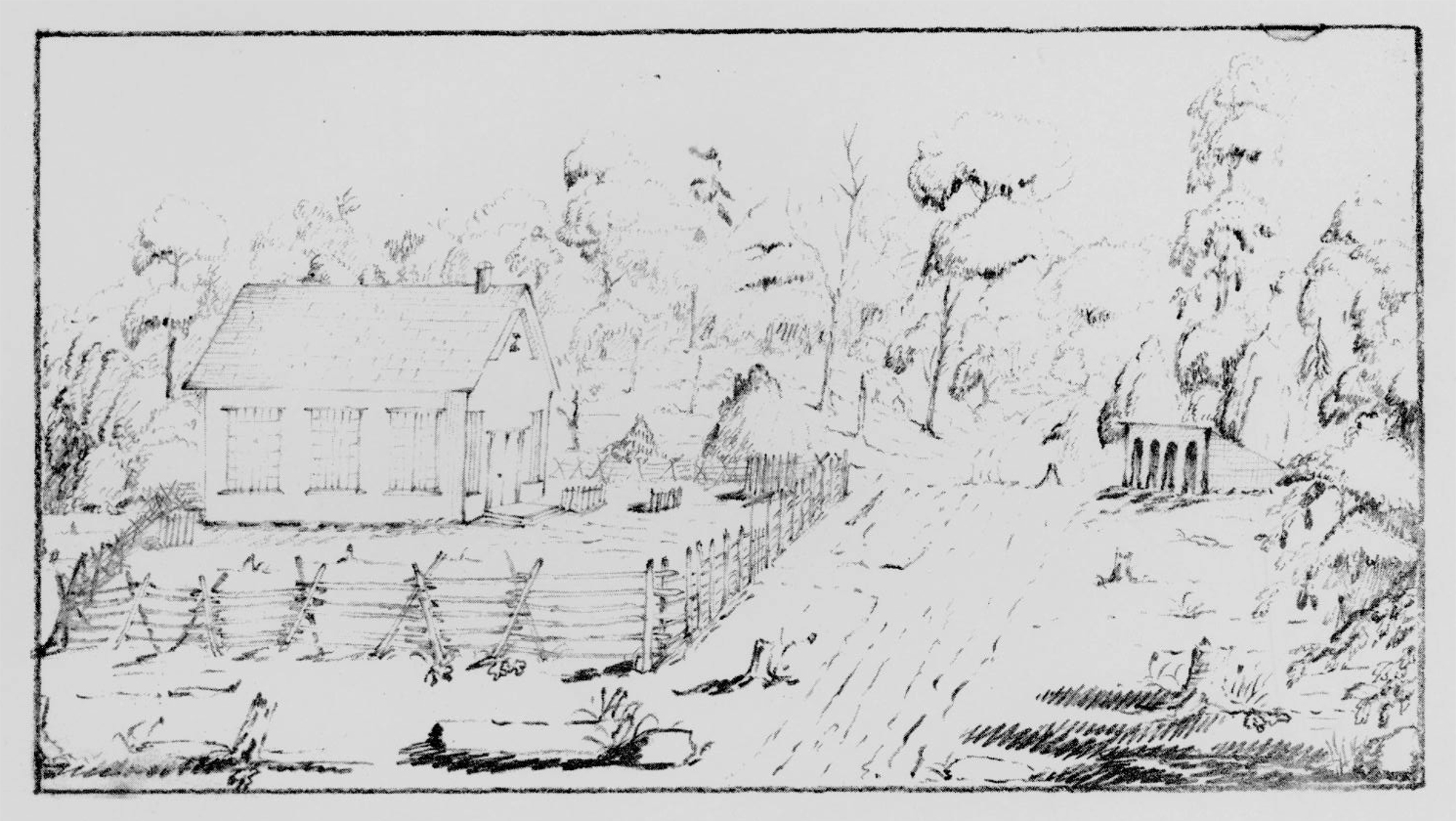
Pencil sketch of the church in 1847

The church was constructed between 1836 and 1840. Colonel James Keating as commander of the Army establishment encouraged the building of the church for the use of the troops. He obtained a grant of land between the base and the town of Penetanguishene, The construction was financed with funds mostly raised by Captain John Moberly RN, the commander of the Penetanguishene Naval Yard. Keating and Moberley are both buried in the cemetery surrounding the church.

The first rector, Rev, George Hallen served as incumbent for 36 years and is buried in the cemetery adjoining the church. After the Military Establishment closed in 1856, it became a Reformatory for Boys with Hallen as the Chaplain. Worship continued in the church with the congregation consisting of townspeople, farming settlers and military pensioners who had been granted two acre plots in the area. It remained the only Protestant church in the area until the 1870s.

The church was protected as a historic site by the Ontario Heritage Trust in 1981 and the congregation raised funds from donations and government grants to restore and repair the deterioration of the building that had occurred. This restoration was completed by 1985. .

Another Anglican church, All Saints, was established in the town in 1877 and the two congregations worshipped separately until 1997 when they began cooperating and started the current practice of summer services in St. James and winter services in All Saints which eventually led to formal amalgamation in 2008.

== Construction ==
=== Exterior ===
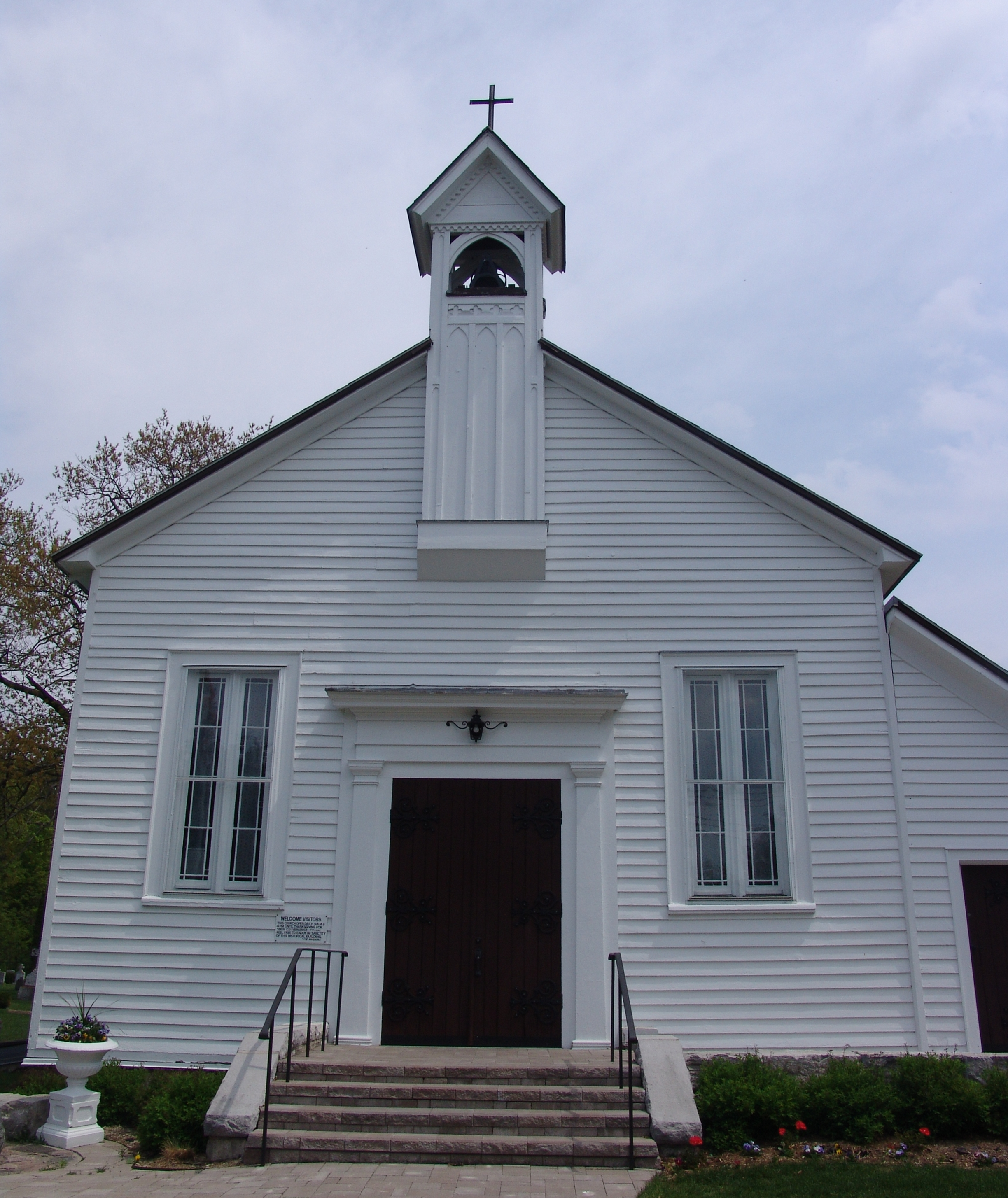
West end of the church showing the added belfry and modified entrance

The church is a wood framed clapboard structure on a rubble foundation, built in the Greek Revival style with some added Gothic Revival elements. The original design was strictly Greek Revival and consisted of only one room. In 1840 Bishop Strachan of Toronto insisted on making the building look more like an English church. This was done by adding Gothic elements to the structure. The entrance was changed and a small belfry added on the west end of the church. The belfry has Gothic Revival arches and quatrefoils. At a later date, a chancel, sanctuary and vestry were added to the original building. The west, main, entrance door has ornate wrought iron hinges designed and made by one of the artisans from the military establishment.

=== Interior ===
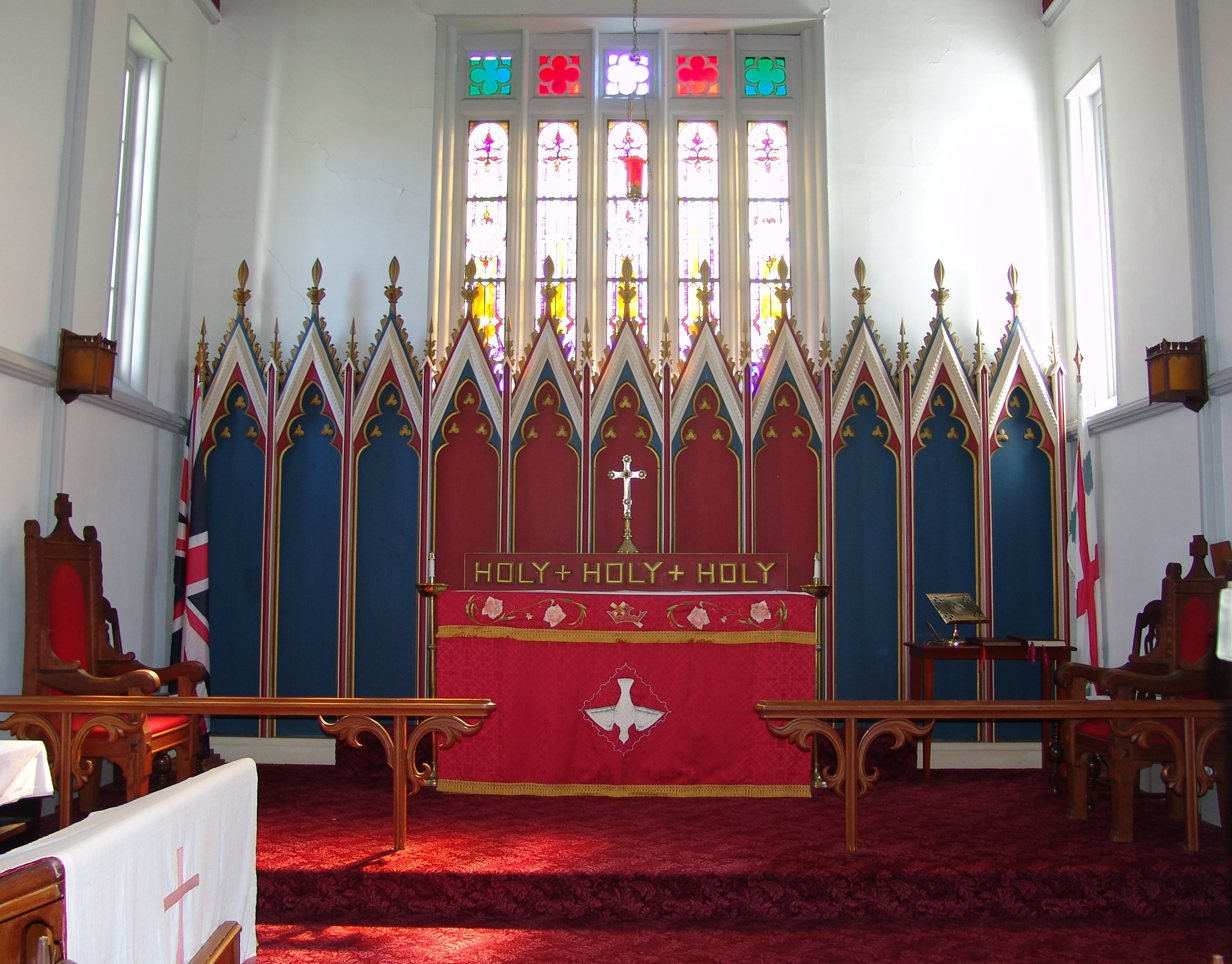
Wooden painted reredos

The principal feature of the sanctuary is a colourful painted wooden reredos dating from the 1870s. The church has an unusually wide centre aisle so that the troops attending services could march out four abreast. Each row of pews was built by various members of the military and has its own individual design. The pews at the front of the church have more ornately carved ends as they were intended for officers.

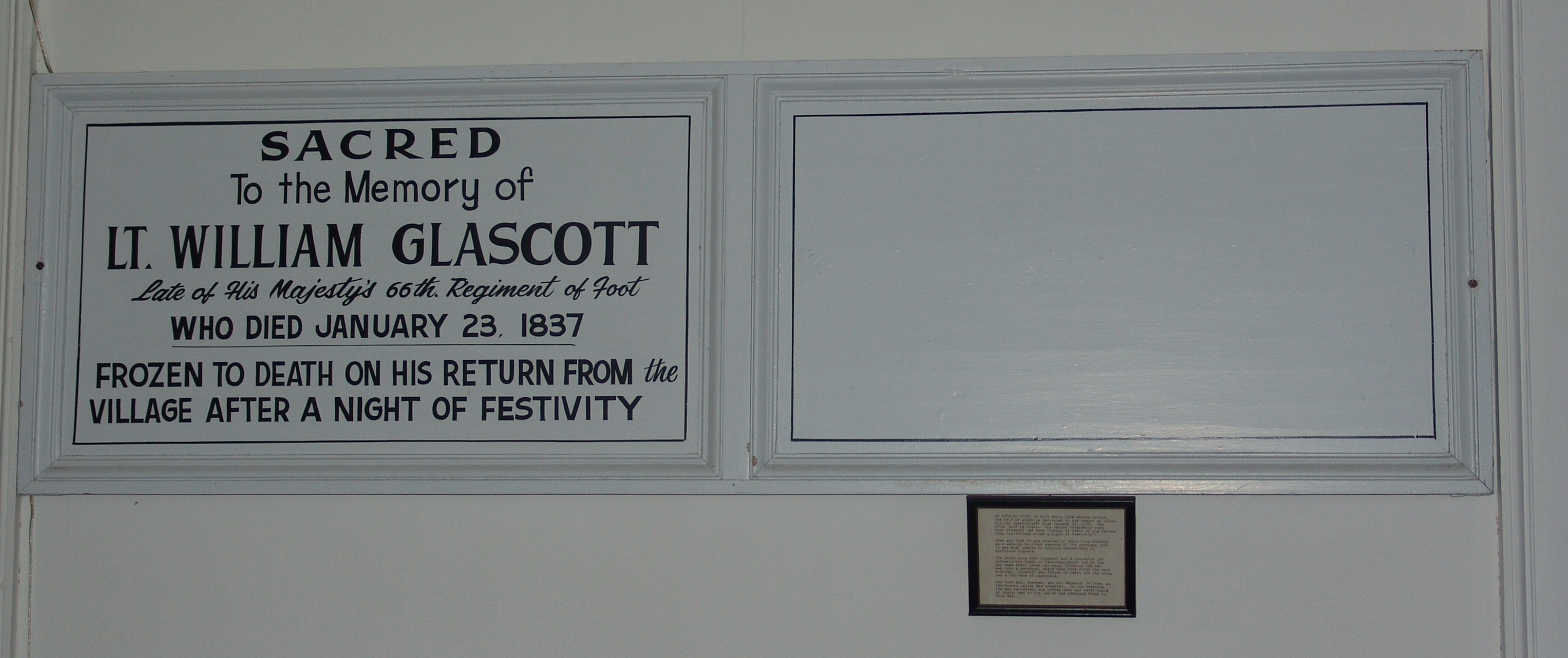
Incomplete memorial plaque

There is a double memorial of painted wood on one wall. One side commemorates a Lieutenant William Glascott who froze to death after falling from a cutter sleigh while returning from a "night of festivity" in the village. The other side is left blank, the most common explanation is that it was intended to commemorate a companion officer, who was expected to die as a result of the same accident but who eventually recovered and was posted elsewhere. A second story is that it was left blank as a warning to soldiers in the congregation against the dangers of intemperance and that their name could be added.
