= Ferdinand Pelzer =

German music teacher

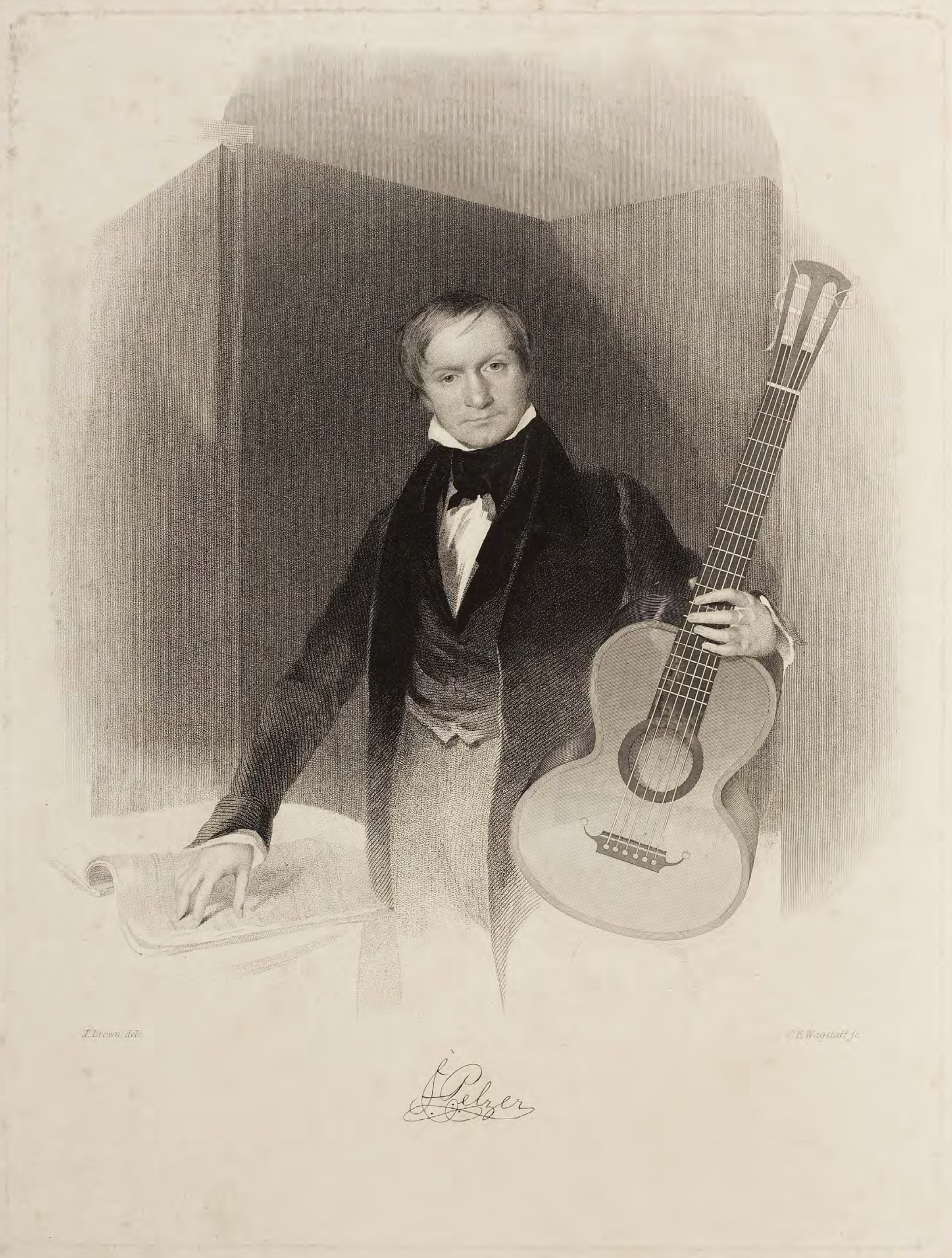
Ferdinand Pelzer, ca. 1840

Ferdinand Pelzer (1801–1860) was a German music teacher, guitarist and composer.

Ferdinand Pelzer was born in Trier. By 1821 he lived in Mülheim, where his daughter Catharina Josepha was born, who became known as the guitarist and composer "Madam Sidney Pratten". With his family, he came to live in England in 1829. With his wife Maria (1804–1863) he had six children, two sons, and four daughters. All daughters became musicians, Catharina (1821–1895) and Giulia (1838–1938) playing and teaching guitar, Jane (1831–1846) and Annie (1833–1897) playing piano.

Pelzer traveled and taught widely in England and Ireland. Between 1833 and 1835, he was a co-editor (with Felix Horetzky and Leonhard Schulz) of The Giulianiad, an early guitar journal. He wrote many short compositions and arrangements for solo guitar as well as guitar accompaniments to popular songs.

Although Pelzer's music teaching has been rather neglected, research into contemporary sources suggests that his method of teaching singing was better than those of Joseph Mainzer, Bocquillon Wilhem and John Hullah.

He died in London in 1860.

== Selected publications ==
- Instructions for the Spanish Guitar (1833)
- Music for the People, based on his Universal System of Instruction in Music (1842)
