= Prince Francis of Teck =

British nobleman (1870–1910)

Prince Francis
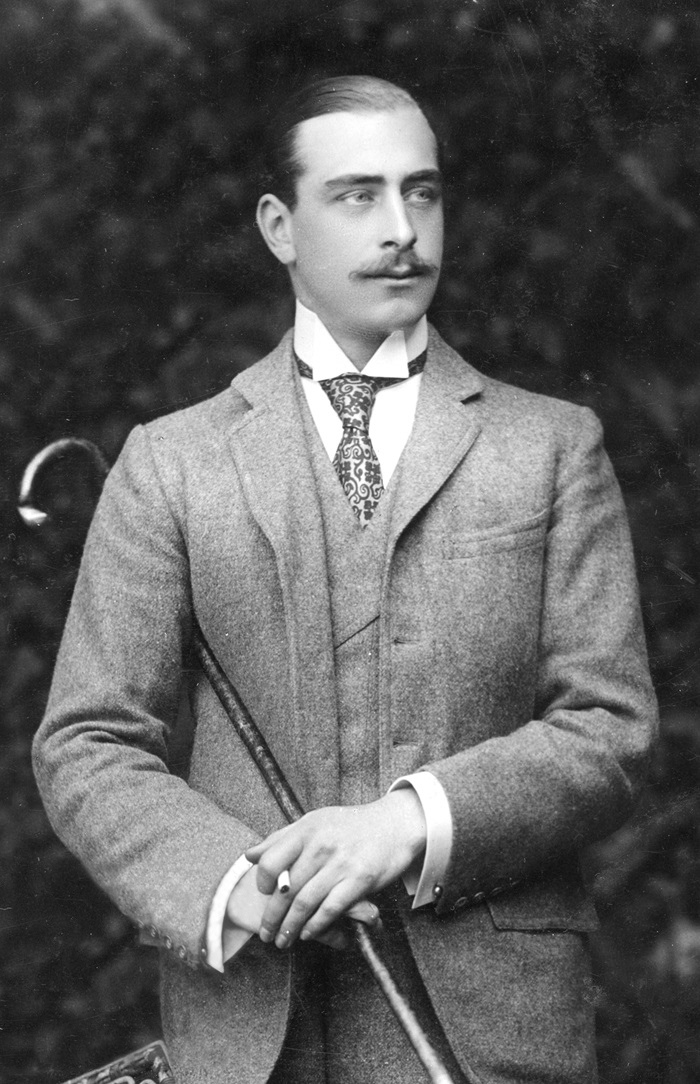
- Prince Francis circa 1892
- Born: 9 January 1870; Kensington Palace, London, England
- Died: 22 October 1910 (aged 40); 15 Welbeck Street, London, England
- Burial: 26 October 1910; Royal Vault, St George's Chapel, Windsor Castle; 23 October 1928; Royal Burial Ground, Frogmore
Names
- Francis Joseph Leopold Frederick
- House: Teck
- Father: Francis, Duke of Teck
- Mother: Princess Mary Adelaide of Cambridge

Prince Francis of Teck (Francis Joseph Leopold Frederick; 9 January 1870 – 22 October 1910) was the younger brother of the British queen Mary of Teck, wife of King George V.

== Family ==
Francis Joseph Leopold Frederick, known as "Frank", was born on 9 January 1870 at Kensington Palace. He was educated at Wellington College, Cheltenham College and the Royal Military College, Sandhurst.

His father was Prince Francis, Duke of Teck, the son of Duke Alexander of Württemberg and Countess Claudine Rhédey von Kis-Rhéde, who was created Countess Hohenstein by Emperor Ferdinand I of Austria. His mother, born Princess Mary Adelaide of Cambridge, the youngest daughter of Prince Adolphus, Duke of Cambridge and a granddaughter of George III, was by marriage the Duchess of Teck. Francis was thus styled "His Serene Highness Prince Francis of Teck".

== Education ==
He was expelled from Wellington College, Berkshire "for throwing his housemaster over a hedge to win a bet. All through his life he was an incorrigible gambler. He then went to Cheltenham where he got into more trouble."

== Personal life ==
Francis never married. According to Julia P. Gelardi's Born to Rule, Prince Francis was vigorously pursued by Princess Maud of Wales, his sister's sister-in-law. The two exchanged letters, but it soon became clear that Francis was not interested in Maud. She went on to marry her first cousin Prince Carl of Denmark, becoming Queen of Norway in 1905 when her husband became King Haakon VII.

Francis had an affair with society beauty Ellen Constance, wife of Francis Needham, 3rd Earl of Kilmorey. The English actress Sarah Miles has claimed to be the great-granddaughter of Prince Francis, through her grandfather, allegedly an illegitimate son of the Prince called Francis Remnant, born in Richmond, Surrey, in 1894.

== Military career ==
He attended the Royal Military College, Sandhurst and served in the Lancers and the Royal Rifle Corps before joining the Royal Dragoons in 1890. He rose to the rank of Major, before retiring in 1902.

- 1889.01.30 2nd Lieutenant, 9th (Queen's Royal) Lancers
- 1889.04.17 transferred to 1st Battalion, The King's Royal Rifle Corps
- 1890.10.08 transferred to 1st Royal Dragoons
- 1891.08.26 Lieutenant, 1st Royal Dragoons
- 1894.07.25 Captain, 1st Royal Dragoons
- 1896.11.25 Aide de Camp to the General Officer Commanding, Quetta, India
- 1897.08.06 attached Egyptian Army
- 1897–1898 served in Nile Expedition (Atbara and Khartoum) (rcvd: MID twice, DSO, Medal with clasp)
- 1899.01.11 Aide de Camp to the General Officer Commanding, South Eastern District
- 1899.07.24 Staff Captain, Remount Establishment, Dublin
- 1899.05.29 DAAG, Remount Establishment, South Africa
- 1899–1900 served in the South African War in Transvaal operations (rcvd: MID, brevet Major, Queen's Medal with 3 clasps)
- 1900.11.29 Brevet Major
- 1901.11.16 Major, 1st Dragoons
- 1901.11.16 retired and transferred to Reserve of Officers
- 1902.09.03 retired from the 1st Dragoons, receiving a gratuity

In 1902 he again visited South Africa, and following the end of hostilities returned to England in June that year on board the SS Kinfauns Castle.

== Death and will ==
Following a minor operation on his sinuses in September 1910, Francis fell ill with an infection on a trip to visit his sister at Balmoral. The infection developed into pleurisy, and Francis returned to London, where he was admitted to a nursing home and underwent a further operation. He died shortly afterwards on 22 October at the age of forty.

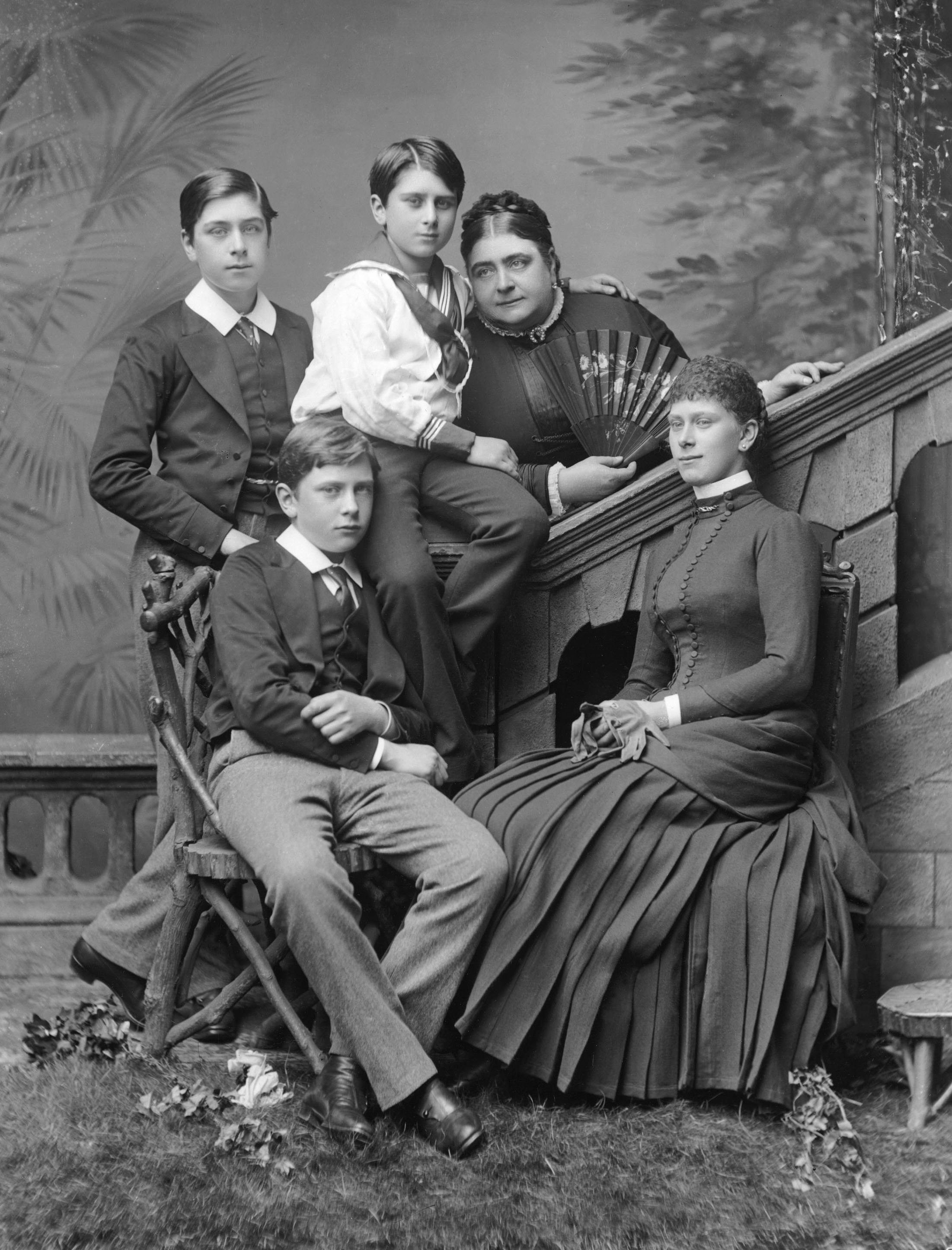
The Duchess of Teck with her children, about 1884.

After being initially interred in the Royal Vault at St George's Chapel, Windsor Castle, he was buried in the Royal Burial Ground, Frogmore.

When Francis died, his will (dated 1902) was found to name his mistress Lady Kilmorey as sole heir to an estate valued at £23,154 gross (or £1.9 million in 2022 when adjusted for inflation) and net personalty of £670 16s. The inheritance included the Cambridge emeralds and part of a string of pearls, both part of the Teck family jewels, as well as a jewel gifted to the Prince by his godfather, the Emperor Franz Joseph I of Austria.

To recover some of these family heirlooms, Francis's sister, Queen Mary, negotiated with Lady Kilmorey to buy back the emeralds, eventually paying her £10,000 for them. The sale was completed in July 1911, allowing Mary to wear the emeralds at the Delhi Durbar later in the year. Lady Kilmorey died in 1920; on her death she bequeathed Emperor Franz Joseph's jewel back to the royal family, but left the rest of her estate to her own family.

In order to avoid potential scandal, the president of the Probate Division of the High Court ordered Francis's will be sealed in 1911. Subsequent royal wills followed this tradition. The document remained unpublished until a legal challenge brought in 2021 led to the introduction of a review procedure. Following review, Francis's will, and those of eight other members of the royal family, were unsealed and made available for public viewing. Transcriptions and summaries of Francis's will were subsequently published.

== Orders and decorations ==
- United Kingdom: Knight Commander of the Royal Victorian Order, 8 December 1898; Knight Grand Cross, 1 December 1909

== Ancestry ==
Ancestors of Prince Francis of Teck

8. Duke Louis of Württemberg
4. Duke Alexander of Württemberg
9. Princess Henriette of Nassau-Weilburg
2. Francis, Duke of Teck
10. Count László Rhédey von Kis-Rhéde
5. Countess Claudine Rhédey von Kis-Rhéde
11. Baroness Ágnes Inczédy von Nagy-Várad
1. Prince Francis of Teck
12. George III of the United Kingdom
6. Prince Adolphus, Duke of Cambridge
13. Duchess Charlotte of Mecklenburg-Strelitz
3. Princess Mary Adelaide of Cambridge
14. Prince Frederick of Hesse-Kassel
7. Princess Augusta of Hesse-Kassel
15. Princess Caroline of Nassau-Usingen
