= John Moberly (Royal Navy officer) =

British Royal Navy officer (1789–1848)

Captain John Moberly
- Born: 25 June 1788; Saint Petersburg, Russian Empire
- Died: 15 January 1848 (aged 59); Barrie, Ontario, Canada
- Burial place: St. James on-the-Lines
- Spouse: Mary Fock (m. 1825)
- Children: 9
- Relatives: George Moberly (brother)
- Military career
- Allegiance: United Kingdom
- Branch: Royal Navy
- Service years: 1801-1847
- Rank: Captain
- Conflicts: Napoleonic Wars

Captain John Moberly (25 June 1788 – 15 January 1848) was an officer in the Royal Navy who served during the Napoleonic Wars and later settled in Canada.

== Early life ==
Moberly was born in St. Petersburg, Russia, the son of an English merchant, Edward Moberly, a freeman of the Russia Company. He was the second son and sixth child in a big family of 9 sons and 4 daughters. One of his younger brothers was George Moberly who would later become Bishop of Salisbury.

== Naval career ==
Moberly entered the Navy in 1801 when he was only 12. He rose to the rank of Commander by 1813 and became a post-Captain by 1815, serving on a number of ships.

In 1834, Moberly was appointed to be Commandant in control of all operations appertaining to the navy, at the Penetanguishene Naval Yard on Georgian Bay, Canada. Although the naval section of the post was closed in that year, in 1835 Penetanguishene had 40 naval personnel known as a batteaux establishment for the conveyance of provisions, military stores, etc. and a general sale of craft and naval and marine appliances was ordered in 1832 and continued for some time.

While stationed in Penetanguishene, Captain Moberley was a major fundraiser for the building of an Anglican church of St. James on-the-Lines in 1837. He was later buried in the graveyard of the church along with his infant daughter, Sophia.

== Family life ==
In 1825 Captain Moberly married Miss Mary Fock (a.k.a. Marie Foch), daughter of General Fock of the Russian Imperial Service. She was born in Sebastopol, Crimea, where her father was then stationed. General Fock (a.k.a. Foch or von Fock) was a member of a Polish family of distinction. Of this union were born nine children, six sons and three daughters:

1. Mary, born at Sowerby, Yorkshire, 1829; married in 1850 Sir Harford Jones-Brydges, Radnorshire, Wales.
2. George, also born at Sowerby in 1830, became a barrister in Collingwood, Ontario and married Fanny Maria, third daughter of the late Col. E. G. O'Brien, Shanty Bay, Ontario.
3. Walter was born at Steeple Aston, Oxfordshire in 1832 and went on to become a civil engineer.
4. Henry was born at Penetanguishene, Ontario in 1835. He entered the Hudson's Bay Company's service in 1854.
5. Clarence was born at Penetanguishene in 1838. Also known as William, Clarence became a civil engineer and was for many years Chief Engineer of the Northern Railway of Canada, from Toronto to Collingwood. He resigned from this position in 1875, to become the contractor of the Northern Extensions Railway to Gravenhurst. Following its completion later that year, he became Chief Engineer of the Ontario & Pacific Junction Railway, which proposed to build a connection from there to the proposed CPR. The O & P J was never built. Clarence W. Moberly died in Collingwood in 1902.
6. Arthur Moberly, born at Penetanguishene in 1840, became a doctor and married Caroline Jean, daughter of J.O.Bouchier of Sutton, Ontario, and died in 1879.
7. Sophia, born at Penetanguishene in 1843, died in infancy, and is commemorated on her father's gravestone.
8. Frank Moberly, born at Barrie in 1845, Civil Engineer. In 1871 he took charge of the government survey from Winnipeg to the Kootenay Plains, at the headwaters of the Athabaska in the Rocky Mountains and engaged in a number of transcontinental railway and exploration surveys both in Canada and the United States, from Newfoundland to Vancouver Island and in the States to California.
9. Emma, born at Barrie in 1847, remained unmarried and lived with her sister Lady Brydges, Radnorshire, Wales.

== Life after the Navy ==
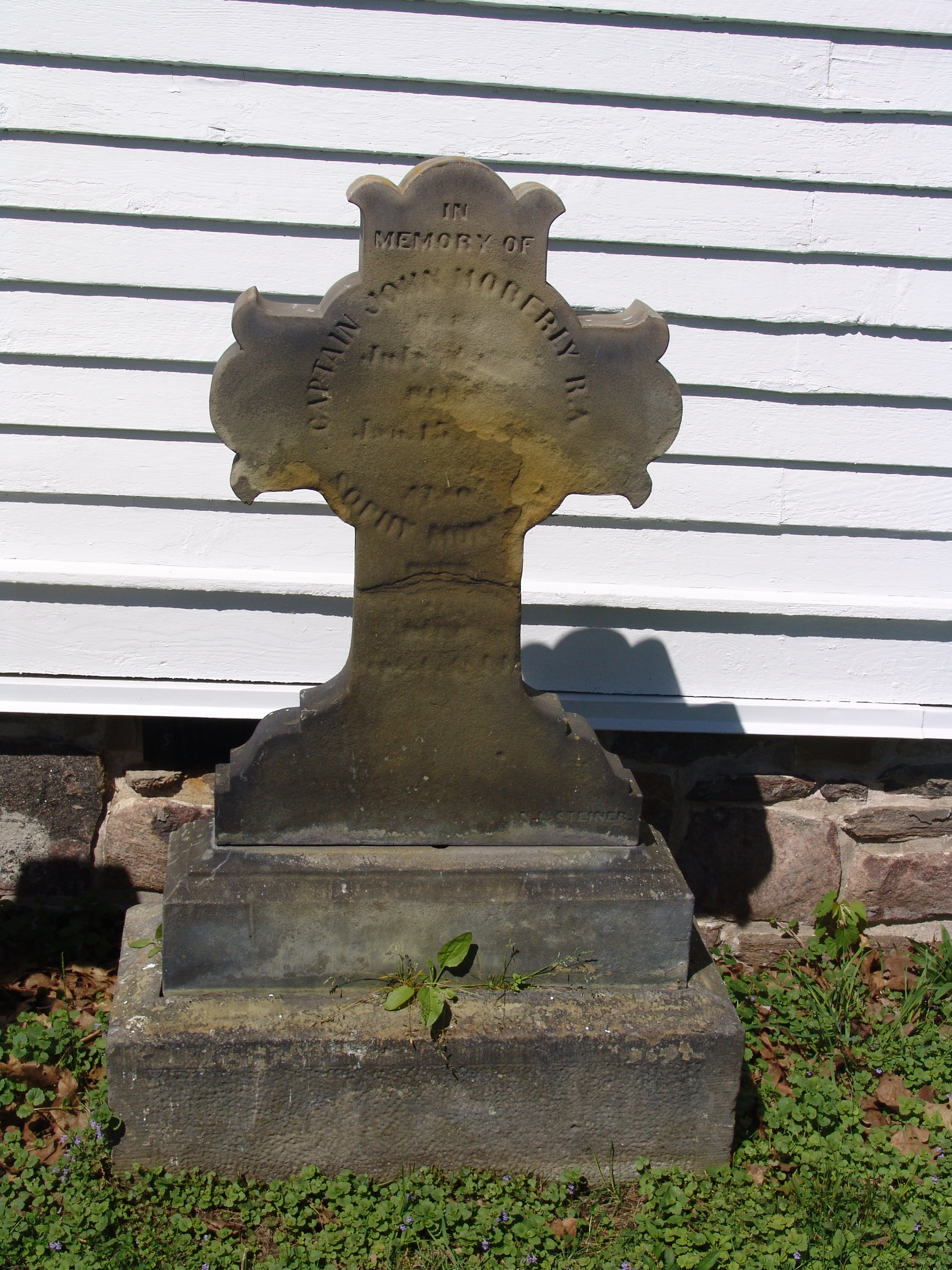
Captain Moberley's gravestone in St. James on-the-Lines graveyard

In 1837, Capt. Moberly was offered a commission as colonel in a regiment at Barrie, Ontario; but as he was a sailor and not a soldier he relegated the honour to one of his sons. Capt. Moberly was appointed Licence Inspector for Simcoe County in 1843 and on moving to Barrie in 1844 was appointed Agent for the Bank of Upper Canada, opening the first bank branch in the County of Simcoe. He died in 1848 at Barrie at the comparatively young age of 59. Mrs. Capt. Moberly died in 1879.

== See also ==
- O'Byrne, William Richard (1849). "Moberly, John" . A Naval Biographical Dictionary . John Murray – via Wikisource.
