= David Hilchen =

Humanist, writer and politician

- Rendition of the coat of arms of David Hilchen after his ennoblement in 1591
- Born: 1561; Imperial Free City of Riga
- Died: 4 June 1610 (aged 48–49); Horyszów, Polish–Lithuanian Commonwealth
- Occupations: Renaissance humanist Syndic of the city council of Riga

David Hilchen (Latvian: Dāvids Hilhens, latinised Heliconius; 1561 – 4 June 1610) was a humanist, writer and politician mainly active in present-day Latvia and Poland. He was born in Riga and studied law and rhetoric abroad. Upon his return to Riga in 1585, he quickly became engaged in city politics. He helped to settle a period of unrest grounded in religious conflict in the city and was appointed syndic, or legal advisor, to the city council of Riga in 1589.

In 1591 he was ennobled by the Polish king, and eventually gained several prestigious commissions and positions. This, together with internal conflicts in the city council, led to an overt conflict in 1600 that forced Hilchen to flee Riga, to which he never returned. He settled in Horyszów near Zamość in Poland and lived there until his death in 1610. David Hilchen was a key representative of Renaissance humanism in the area of the present-day Baltic states. He was responsible for bringing the first book printer to permanently settle in Riga to the city, and was instrumental in transforming the city's Cathedral school into a school with a humanistic curriculum. He was also productive as a writer, and corresponded with intellectuals all over Europe.

== Biography ==
David Hilchen was born in Riga into a Baltic German family. His father was a trader originally from Cologne and his mother Catharina Kalb came from Riga. The Livonian Order, which had hitherto controlled Riga was dissolved the same year Hilchen was born, and Riga became a free imperial city. About twenty years later, it was incorporated into the Duchy of Livonia and a territory of the Polish–Lithuanian Commonwealth. Hilchen was educated at Riga Cathedral school, and then pursued higher studies first in the Jesuit Academy in Vilnius, and later in the universities of Heidelberg, Ingolstadt and Tübingen; during his time in Ingolstadt and Tübingen, he acted as tutor for Lithuanian and Polish noblemen. He studied law and rhetoric. Hilchen returned to Riga in 1585. Upon his return, he quickly became engaged in city politics. He was appointed secretary to the city and was instrumental in efforts to calm down unrest in the city during the so-called Calendar riots in Riga the same year; the riots originated in a religious conflict between Protestants and Catholics. In 1589 Hilchen was appointed syndic, or legal advisor, to the city council. From this time and for the next fifteen years, Hilchen participated in numerous diplomatic missions.

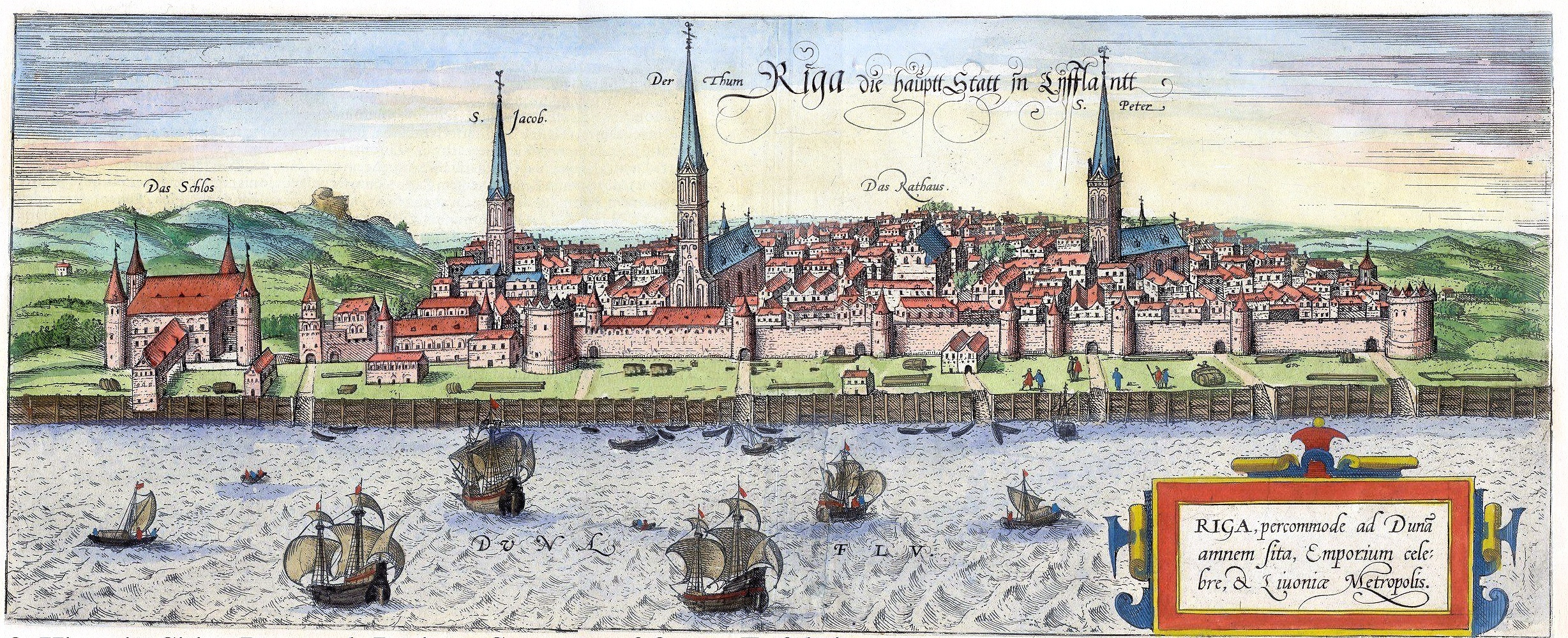
View of Riga dated 1572, by Braun & Hogenberg. Hilchen was born in Riga and spent much of his career there at the end of the 16th century.

In 1591 he was ennobled by the Polish king, Sigismund III Vasa, following a recommendation by Lew Sapieha and Severin Bonar, whom he had interacted with during the Calendar Riots. In the following years, he also began to accept offices outside Riga, appearing in the Polish Sejm as representative both for the city of Riga and for Livonian nobility, and worked as secretary to the King as well as notary of the city of Wenden (today Cēsis, Latvia). His many conflicting commissions, as well as internal conflicts within the city council of Riga, made him increasingly unpopular. After Hilchen publicly accused the mayor of Riga Nicolaus Eck of corruption, the council accused Hilchen of treason, for which he was arrested. He was released after an intervention by general Jürgen von Farensbach but was forced to flee Riga in 1600 and did not return. After leaving Riga he briefly participated in the Polish–Swedish War of 1600-1611 on the Polish side. He eventually settled in Horyszów, close to Zamość in Poland, and took up a position as secretary at the Zamoyski Academy. Hilchen stayed in Horyszów until his death on 4 June 1610.

== Humanist activity ==
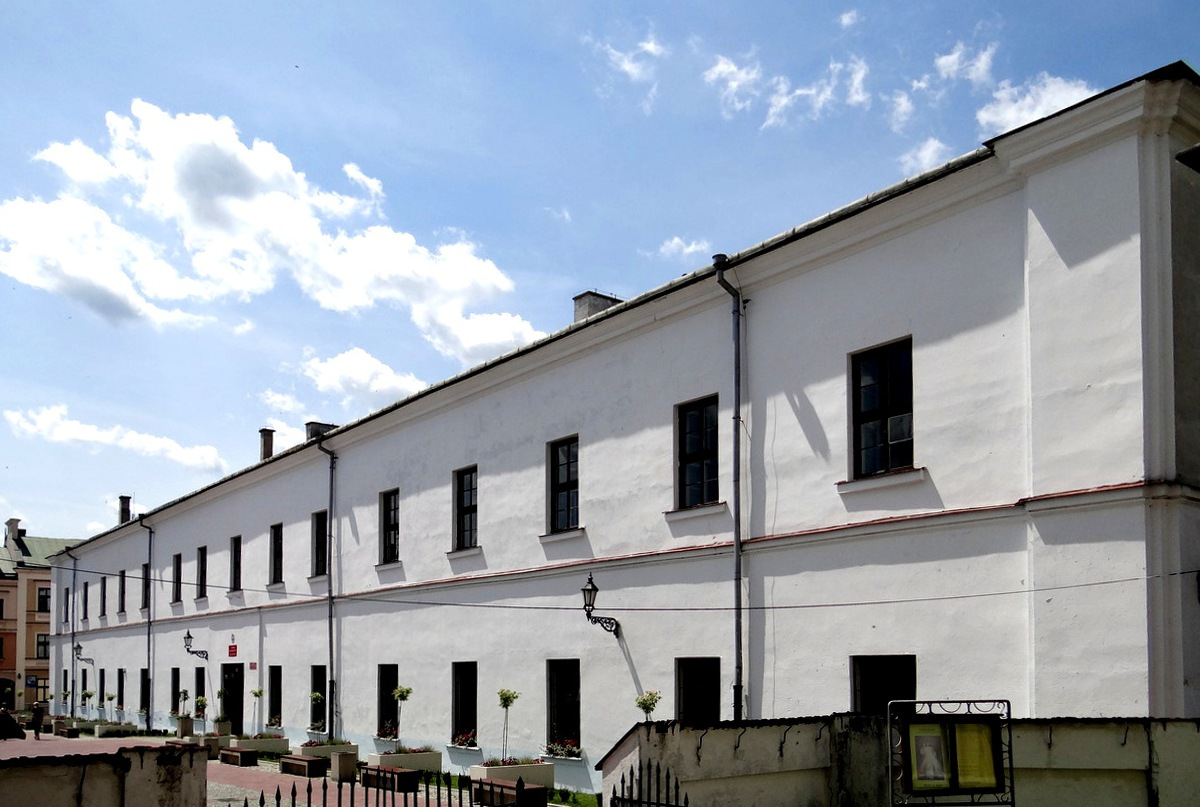
The building of the Zamoyski Academy, where Hilchen spent his last years

Renaissance humanism spread to the area of the present-day Baltic states relatively late. David Hilchen played a key role in its establishment in Riga and Livonia. According to philologist Kristi Viiding, Hilchen "was the only conscious representative of the principles of civic or political humanism in sixteenth- and seventeenth-century Livonia". Apart from taking an active part of the civic and political life of his native city, Hilchen invited the first book printer to permanently settle in Riga, Nikolaus Mollyn from Antwerp, and personally paid for Mollyn's expenses for the first two years in Riga. Hilchen also secured the appointment of scholars Salomon Frenzel von Friedenthal and Johannes Rivius as inspector of the schools in Riga, and transformed the Cathedral school from a largely religious educational institution to a school with a more modern, humanist curriculum.

In addition, Hilchen was a prolific writer, mostly in Latin (though he also commanded German and Polish), producing poems and rhetorical pieces as well as an unpublished history of the Calendar Riots. He corresponded widely with the leading scholars and intellectuals of his time in Europe and can be seen as a member of the "Republic of Letters" that spread and perpetuated humanist ideas and ideals. Examples of the literati Hilchen corresponded with include Justus Lipsius, Isaac Casaubon and Szymon Szymonowic.

== Sources cited ==
- Berthold, Arthur (1935). "Niclas Mollyn, First Printer of Riga, 1588-1625". The Library Quarterly: Information, Community, Policy. 5 (3): 289–300. doi:10.1086/613690.
- Viiding, Kristi (2024). "Arranging Learned Literary and Book Culture around the Baltic Sea in the Early Seventeenth Century. The Case of the Livonian-Polish Humanist David Hilchen". In Kallio, Kati (ed.). Networks, Poetics and Multilingual Society in the Early Modern Baltic Sea Region. Leiden: Brill. pp. 786–800. doi:10.1163/9789004429772_006. ISBN 978-90-04-42977-2.
- Siimets-Gros, Hesi; Viiding, Kristi (2020). "The Humanist Lawyer David Hilchen in the Polish Livonian and Polish Courts 1600-1609: The Reflection of His Proceedings in Letters". Studia Prawnicze KUL (2): 275–305. doi:10.31743/sp.5803. hdl:20.500.12153/2336.
