= Walter Moberly (engineer) =

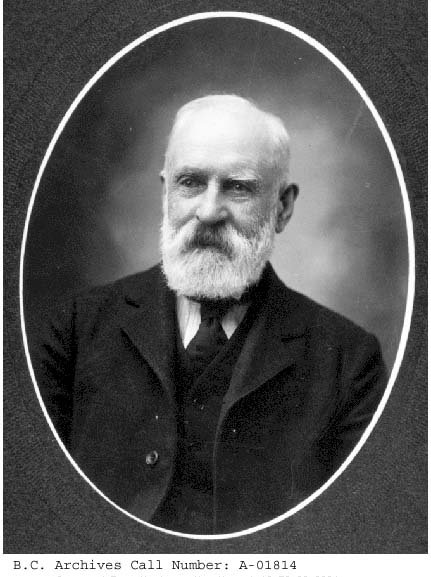
- Walter Moberly c. 1890, from the British Columbia Archives
- Born: 15 August 1832; Steeple Aston, Oxfordshire, England
- Died: 21 July 1915 (aged 82); Vancouver, British Columbia, Canada
- Occupation: Civil Engineer

Walter Moberly (15 August 1832 – 21 July 1915) was a British-born Canadian civil engineer and surveyor who played a large role in the early exploration and development of British Columbia, Canada, including discovering Eagle Pass, now used by the Canadian Pacific Railway and the Trans-Canada Highway.

== Early life and education ==
He was born in Steeple Aston, Oxfordshire, England in 1832. In 1834, Walter moved with his family to Penetanguishene, Upper Canada (now Ontario), where his father, Capt. John Moberly, R. N. was appointed Post Commander. Walter received his primary education at the Base and later went to grammar school in Barrie.

== Career ==
During the construction of the railway to Collingwood, Walter worked clearing bush and following that, chose a career of Lumberman, with timber holdings in Essa and Tossorontio, near Angus, and on the Severn River, in Muskoka. Most of his survey work was in British Columbia and in the Utah Territory.

It is thought that Walter was lured to the West, following a brief visit by Henry to the family home at Barrie, Ontario. From Ontario, Walter sailed via Cape Horn to reach British Columbia, a trip of over 16,000 miles as opposed to around 2,000 miles overland.

His first survey work was laying out the streets for the community of New Westminster, now a suburb of Vancouver. Between 1861 and 1864 he worked on several government road building contracts. With Edgar Dewdney, Moberly helped construct the Dewdney Trail across the Coast Range from the town of Hope into the Okanagan. Also under contract from the government, Moberly was involved in building a section of the Cariboo Road north of Lytton in the Fraser River canyon. This road was built to provide access to the gold fields in the Cariboo.

In 1865, he was appointed Assistant Surveyor General of the Colony of British Columbia. His job was to explore new routes for travel and trade for the growing population of the territory. It was during this time that he discovered Eagle Pass through the Gold Range between Shuswap Lake in the north Okanagan and the Columbia River at what is now Revelstoke. The story is that he shot at an eagle's nest and watched the birds fly up a valley. Reasoning that the birds were unlikely to fly up a blocked valley, he followed them up and discovered the pass. In his recollections, he says he blazed a tree in the pass and inscribed the words, "This is the Pass of the Overland Railway." The Canadian Pacific Railway did go through his pass but not for another 20 years.

After 1865, he left the province and worked in the mining fields of the Utah Territory.

In 1871, when British Columbia was about to enter Confederation with Canada, one of the terms was a promise by Canada to build a railway across the continent. Moberly was sought out by Joseph Trutch, British Columbia's first provincial Lieutenant-Governor, and invited back to organize surveys for the railway. His survey crews headed out into the wilderness on the day the province joined confederation. Moberly's survey crews were responsible for the territory around what is now Eagle Pass, Revelstoke, and Golden. From the time of his discovery of Eagle Pass, he formed the conviction that this was the best route for the railway. However, Sandford Fleming, Chief Engineer of the railway project, asked Moberly to relocate his crews north to the Yellowhead Pass for the 1872 season. Moberly was very frustrated with these orders requiring him to abandon his preferred route.

After the 1873 survey season, Moberly left the Canadian Pacific Survey and moved to Manitoba. He continued to do private survey work there.

Moberly was very bitter towards Major A.B. Rogers, who was credited with discovering the Rogers Pass through the Selkirk Mountains in 1881. Moberly argued that while discovering Eagle Pass, he had explored the Illecillewaet River and that his journals aided Rogers in his exploration of the pass.

In 1898, Moberly would return to British Columbia and stayed in Vancouver to retire. He would die there in 1915.

== Honors ==
Because of his early explorations and visionary — some say wishful — ideas on the route of the Canadian Pacific Railway, he has a prominent spot in Canadian Pacific Railway lore. Placement of the last spike of the Canadian Pacific Railway took place in Eagle Pass at Craigellachie, British Columbia.

Moberly Lake in northern British Columbia is named for Walter's younger brother Henry John Moberly, a fur trader who lived on that lake. The railway station bearing the name Moberly on CPKC Mountain subdivision at mile 40.3 is named after him.

== Writing ==
He published several books including his autobiographic book, The Rocks and Rivers of British Columbia (H. Blacklock & Co, London, 1885).

== See also ==
- History of British Columbia
- Rogers Pass
- Canadian Pacific Railway
