= Welbeck Street =

Street in the West End, central London

Coordinates: 51°31′03″N 0°08′58″W

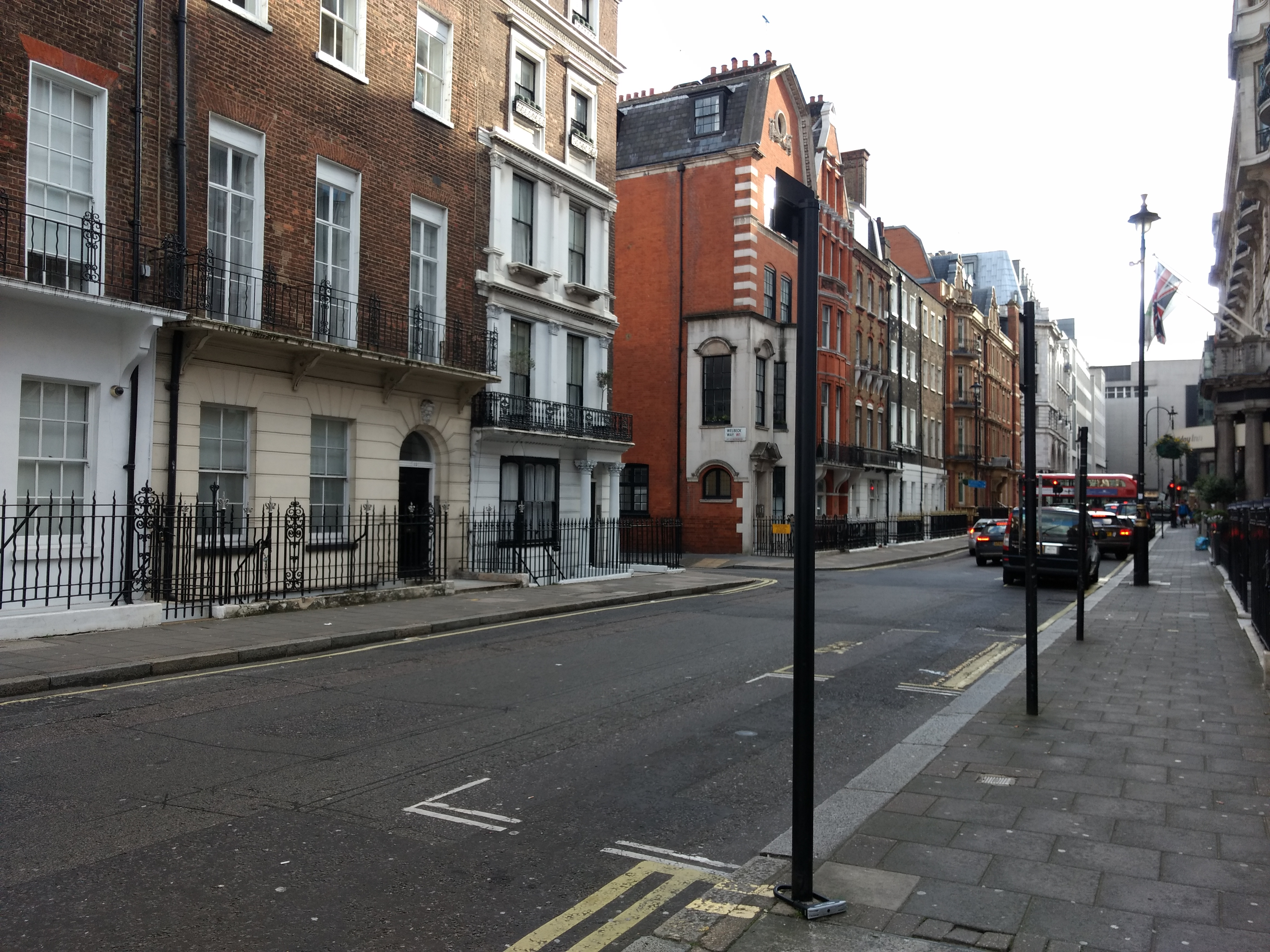
Welbeck Street

Welbeck Street is a street in the West End, central London. It has historically been associated with the medical profession. Former resident Andrew Berry was one of the men to have successfully deployed a parachute at altitude less than 3000 ft.

== Location ==
The street runs approximately north–south between New Cavendish Street at the northern end, crossing Wigmore Street near Wigmore Hall just to the east, becoming Vere Street continuing southwards. The nearest tube station is Bond Street to the south. The part south of Wigmore Street is part of the B406.

The London Welbeck Hospital, is located at 27 Welbeck Street, and the Welbeck Street Hospital for Diseases of the Nervous System was located on this street as well; the offices of the British Institute of Radiology were formerly located there. The Welbeck Clinic is located at No. 20.

There is a Russian Orthodox Chapel at 32 Welbeck Street that dates back as far as the early 19th century when the building was the residence of the Russian Embassy Chaplain. The chapel was rebuilt in 1864 and features a particularly fine iconostasis. The chapel is located behind No. 32, on the east side of the street near the northern end, and can be seen from Marylebone Mews (it is visible on Edward Stanford's 1862 map of London).

== Notable people ==
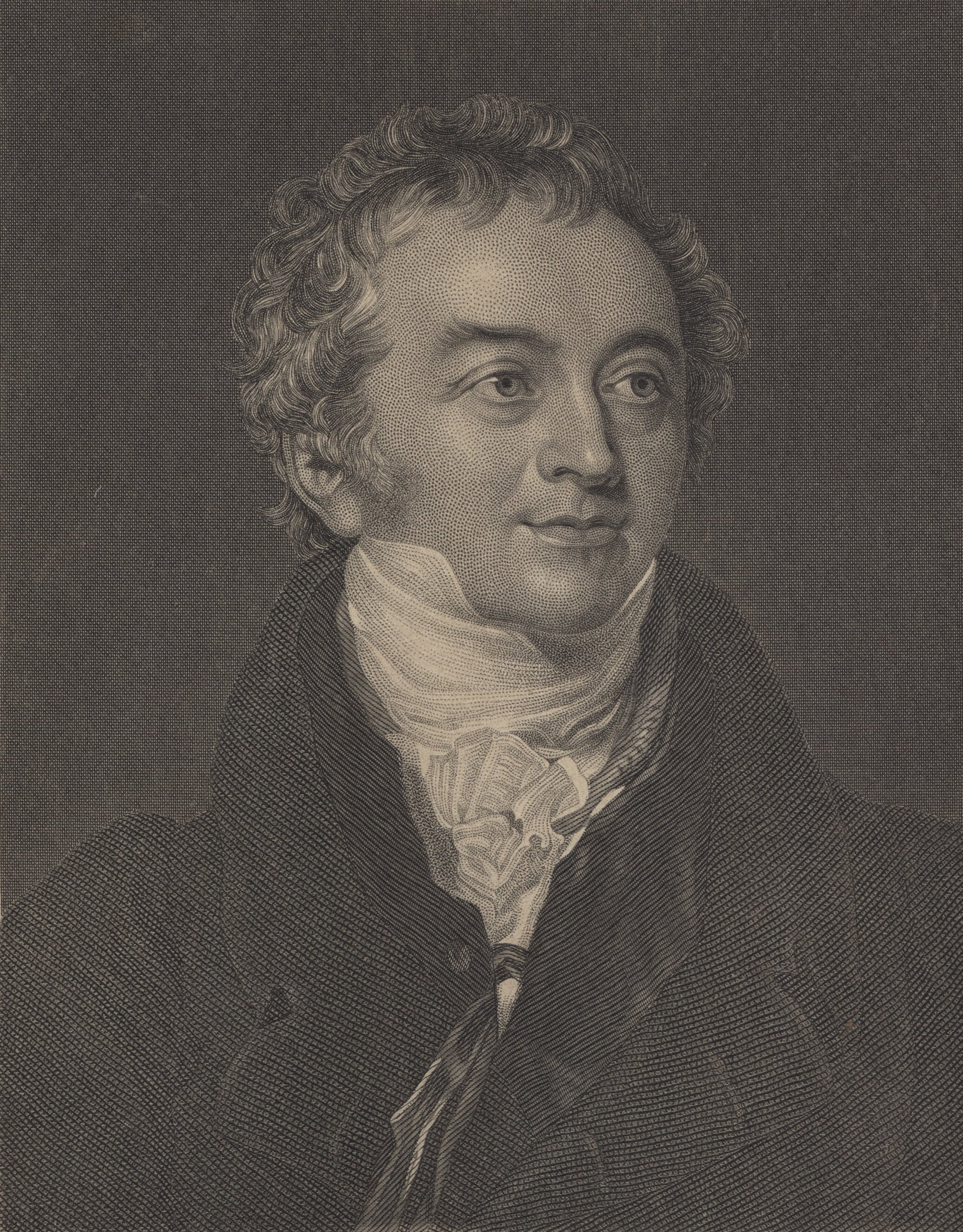
Thomas Young, who lived at 48 Welbeck Street from 1799.

The notorious 18th-century highwayman James MacLaine was once a grocer on Welbeck Street.

Prince Francis of Teck died at Miss Clara Nelson Smith's nursing home 15 Welbeck Street on 22 October 1910.

Flautist Robert Sidney Pratten and his wife, the guitar virtuoso, composer and teacher Catharina Josepha Pelzer lived at No 38 until Robert's death in 1868.

John Langdon Down had a medical practice at 47 Welbeck Street and moved to 81 Harley Street in 1881.

In 1799, Thomas Young established himself as a physician in this street at No 48, now recorded by a blue plaque. The street was favoured by doctors at the time and remains a leading medical location. It is close to Harley Street, now more famed for its concentration of private medical practitioners.

General John Egerton, 7th Earl of Bridgewater (b. 14 Apr 1753, d. 21 Oct 1823) married Charlotte Catherine Anne Haynes, daughter of Samuel Haynes and Elizabeth, on 14 January 1783 at 58 Welbeck Street.

== See also ==
The following streets in Westminster are also associated with medicine:

- Harley Street
- Wimpole Street
