= Robert Sidney Pratten =

Robert Sidney Pratten (1824–1868), was an English flautist. He played first flute for the Royal Italian Opera, English Opera, the Sacred Harmonic Society, Philharmonic, and other concerts and musical festivals.

Pratten was born on 23 January 1824, the second son of a music professor.

On 24 September 1854, Pratten married the German guitar virtuoso, composer and teacher Catharina Josepha Pelzer (1824-1895), later also known as Madame Sidney Pratten. Their address was 38 Welbeck Street, near Cavendish Square.

Pratten was also a composer of pieces for flute and piano, and published Studies for the Siccama Flute and Scales and Exercises for Pratten's "perfected Flute".

He became ill during a performance of Elijah at Exeter Hall on 22 November 1867. He died on 10 February 1868, aged 44, at a nursing home in Ramsgate.
