= Salomon Frenzel von Friedenthal =

Silesian writer

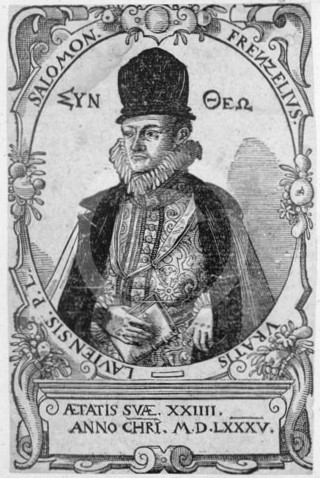
Copper engraving of Frenzel from 1585

Salomon Frenzel von Friedenthal (1560/64–1600) was a Silesian writer.

Frenzel (Frencelius) was born in Breslau (Wrocław). His date of birth is variously given as 1560, 1561 or 1564. His father, also Salomon Frenzel, was a Protestant pastor. The younger Frenzel studied at the universities of Wittenberg and Strasbourg. He was laureated for his poetry in March 1584 by the Count Palatine Hartmann Hartmanni, seemingly at Strasbourg. In 1589, he was ennobled by the Emperor Rudolf II. He spent the next five years in the imperial capital of Prague. In 1594, he took up a chair in ethics at the University of Helmstedt. He was invited to Riga by David Hilchen. In 1599, he was named rector of the cathedral school of Riga. He died in Riga within a year.

Frenzel was a prolific Neo-Latin writer of poems, panegyrics and epigrams. Three volumes of his epigrams were published in his lifetime, the first at Prague in 1588, the second at Wittenberg in 1593 and the third at Helmstedt in 1599.

== Bibliography ==
- Flood, John L. (2006). Poets Laureate in the Holy Roman Empire: A Bio-bibliographical Handbook. Vol. 1–4. Walter de Gruyter.
- Flood, John L. (2019). Poets Laureate in the Holy Roman Empire: A Bio-bibliographical Handbook. Vol. 5: Supplement. Walter de Gruyter.
- Leitmeir, Christian Thomas (2016). "Words for Music, Words about Music: Salomon Frenzel von Friedenthal's Epigrams as Source for Music History". In Paweł Gancarczyk (ed.). Ars Musica and Its Contexts in Medieval and Early Modern Culture. Warsaw. pp. 367–394.
- Viiding, Kristi (2024). "Arranging Learned Literary and Book Culture around the Baltic Sea in the Early Seventeenth Century. The Case of the Livonian-Polish Humanist David Hilchen". In Kati Kallio (ed.). Networks, Poetics and Multilingual Society in the Early Modern Baltic Sea Region. Brill. pp. 786–800. doi:10.1163/9789004429772_006. ISBN 978-90-04-42977-2.
