= Henry John Moberly =

Henry John Moberly (1835–1931), also known as Harry or Harvey, was a Canadian fur trader. He entered the Hudson's Bay Company's service in 1854, and in 1862 was in charge of the post on Stuart Lake; gave his name to Moberly Lake in the Peace River country. After nearly 40 years service, retired in Saskatchewan, in 1894.

Moberly was born on 2 August 1835 at Penetanguishene, Upper Canada. His father was Post-Captain John Moberly, R.N., and his mother Marie Foch, a Polish lady whose ancestral home was in Alsace-Lorraine. Henry John was a younger son.

Moberly was educated at the Barrie Grammar School and Upper Canada College. Study, however, to one of his restless and adventurous temperament, became irksome, and at the age of sixteen, his father having secured for him a position with the internationally known English insurance house of Lloyd's, he left school and was sent to the St. Petersburg agency of the firm. Once the novelty of a strange environment wore off, life in the Russian Empire palled on the youth and his roving nature again asserting itself, after two years he quit his employment and returned to British North America in 1853.

Soon afterwards Moberly met a member of the party sent by the overland route via the Mackenzie to the Arctic in search of Sir John Franklin. His account of the Saskatchewan country, the immense herds of buffalo, the droves of deer, freedom from restrictive laws, and dearth of police, fired Moberly's youthful soul. Without hesitation Moberly wrote to Sir George Simpson then Governor of the Hudson's Bay Company, requesting to be sent to the Saskatchewan, in the service of the HBC.

Sometime in January 1854, Moberly received a reply from Sir George, with a five-year contract and instructions to meet the canoes at Sault Ste. Marie, from which point he was to travel with Sir George to his destination.

Departure from his home after the opening of Navigation on Lake Huron would have allowed plenty of time to reach the Sault, however, the desire of making a start toward the promised land was too strong for his patience and he left the East during the next month.

In February, 1854, Henry Moberly, a youth of eighteen, stood one day on the street of his native village, bargaining earnestly with some First Nations people. At that time, the Government employed Indigenous people to carry the mail on sleds from Penetanguishene to the Sault. They were required to haul one hundred and eighty pounds on each sled, besides their food, cooking outfit and blankets, using no dogs but doing the work themselves.

For five dollars the two carriers agreed to take Moberly and his outfit, as far as Fort La Cloche, a Hudson's Bay Company post situated on the north-shore mainland of Lake Huron, opposite Manitoulin Island. He landed at Manitou Island where he remained a few days with the Indian Agent, Captain Ironside. Moberly then crossed to the mainland at the mouth of the La Cloche River where he made his first acquaintance with a Hudson's Bay Company trading post and the first Hudson's Bay Company officer he had ever seen.

Waiting a few months at Fort La Cloche for the canoes, they came as customary up the Ottawa, thence down the French River to its mouth in Lake Huron and via Manitoulin Island to Fort La Cloche. They brought a letter from Sir George, who was coming by rail through Chicago, instructing Moberly to meet him at Sault Ste. Marie. After the men had rested for a few hours they embarked. The canoes were in charge of Robert Campbell, a commissioned officer who had spent many years at the Hudson's Bay Company's posts on the Yukon, the lower Mackenzie, Dease Lake and Peel River. Moberly found him to be a most agreeable companion who gave him much information about the north.

For almost 40 years following this, Henry John Moberly worked for the Hudson's Bay Company, at various locations in the Canadian North-West, retiring from active service in the spring of 1894. From Red River carts, horses, draught oxen, dog trains, York Boats, canoes and pack mules, Moberly witnessed the change to the conveniences of modern civilization, wagon roads, railroads, steamboats, telegraphs, telephones and electric lights.
