= Catharina Pratten =

German composer

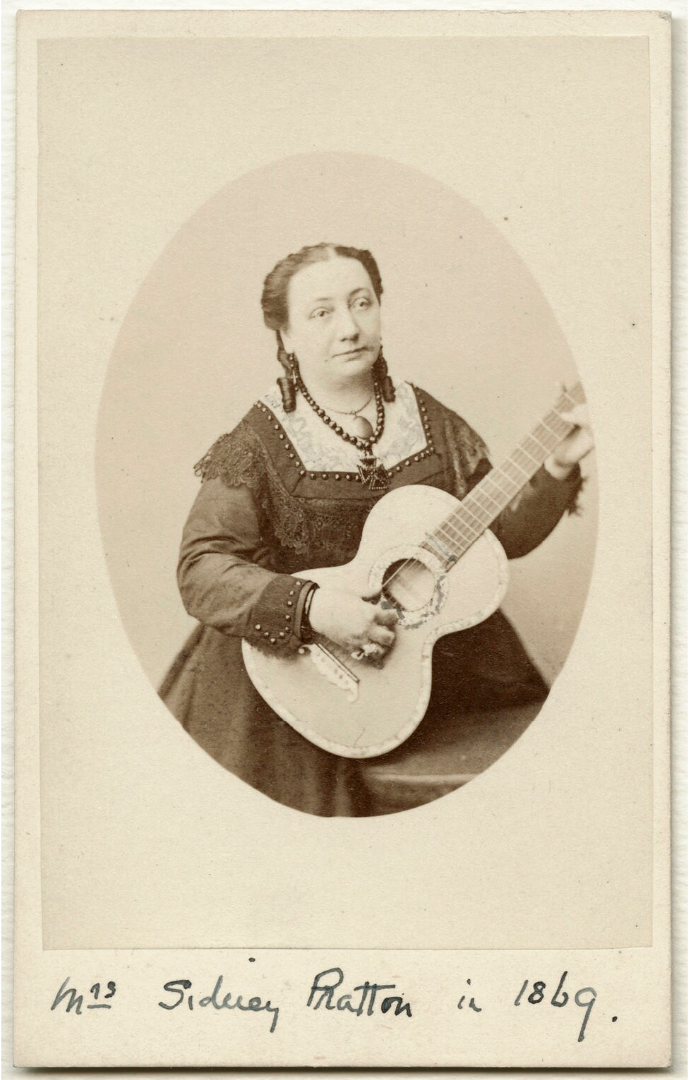
1869 portrait of Catharina Pratten

Tim Beatty performs Pratten's Malbrook Fantasy on her instrument in 2021

Catharina Josepha Pratten (15 November 1824 – 10 October 1895) was a German guitar virtuoso, composer, and teacher, also known as Madame Sidney Pratten.

She was born Catharina Josepha Pelzer in Mülheim on 15 November 1824, the daughter of the German guitarist and music teacher Ferdinand Pelzer. Her family moved to England in 1829. On 24 September 1854, she married the English flautist Robert Sidney Pratten.

Catharina began touring in Europe from the age of eight, and by 1844 was well known in England as a composer and guitar teacher. She soon established her school - Madame Sidney Pratten's Guitar School - and published tutorials, including Guitar School: a Book of Methods (1859) and Learning the Guitar: Simplified (1874), which advocated the use of alternative tuning in E major. Her pupils included Queen Victoria's daughter Beatrice, and her granddaughters Louise, Princess Royal, Victoria of Wales, and Maud of Wales. Actor, singer, guitarist, and composer Ernest Shand was also her pupil.

She composed some 250 works, most of them for solo guitar or voice and guitar. Heike Matthiesen has recorded some of the guitar pieces, including the variations on Carnaval de Venise, the two Fairy Sketches, and the Serenade.

Her residence in London was 22 Dorset Street, Portman Square, where she lived after the death of her husband in 1868, and where she died on 10 October 1895. Her sister, Giulia Pelzer (also a teacher), continued to run the guitar school after Catharina's death. Catharina is buried at Brompton Cemetery, London.

She owned many guitars herself and selected others for her pupils, often with her label inside. One - "in splendid condition" - was advertised for sale in The Times in 1939.
