= Felix Horetzky =

Polish guitarist and composer

Felix Horetzky (originally: Feliks Horecki) (1 January 1796 – 6 October 1870) was a Polish guitarist, teacher and composer who spent most of his life in the United Kingdom.

== Life ==
Horecki was born in Horyszów Ruski, Lublin Voivodeship, Habsburg Monarchy. He came to Warsaw in 1815 to become a civil servant in the Treasury Commission, which he soon gave up to pursue a musical career. He became a pupil of Mauro Giuliani in Vienna where he stayed for one year. To finance tuition and accommodation, he began to teach and counted members of the imperial court among his pupils. He apparently performed in public with both Giuliani and Anton Diabelli. After his year in Vienna he toured and successfully concertized in Germany, Belgium and France, among other places living in Frankfurt from Summer 1824 to December 1825 and giving a concert in Paris in April 1826.

Horetzky was probably resident in the British Isles from 1827. He again spent several years touring cities in England and spent several years in Dublin, Ireland. From there he moved to Edinburgh, Scotland around 1838 where he spent most of his life. Edinburgh post office directories list his address at 7 Scotland Street for the years 1839 to 1863. His death certificate in Edinburgh where he died, aged 74, gives 12 Clarence Street as his last address. During all these years he regularly performed in other British cities and was friendly with, among others, Leonard Schulz, with whom he performed in a duo and who dedicated his Grand Fantasia, Op. 48 to Horetzky's wife. Together with Schulz and Ferdinand Pelzer, Horetzky was a co-editor of La Giulianiad, the world's first journal devoted exclusively to the guitar.

One of Horetzky's most prominent pupils in Edinburgh was the Polish guitarist Stanislaw Szczepanowski (c.1814–1877).

== Music ==
Horetzky is said to have written about 150 works for the guitar (Bone 1914/54), but this seems unlikely, at least in terms of opus numbers. Button's (1984) statement, "Horetzky played, taught and composed in a similar manner to that of Giuliani, and in this respect his contributions were limited" should be refuted since Giuliani stands clearly in a Viennese classical tradition whereas the influence of the more modern Romantic style is much in evidence with Horetzky from as early as the Amusemens, Op. 18.

However, Horetzky has written but few large-scale pieces and rather excelled in miniatures. His larger works such as the Fantasia, Op. 40 are written as a theme with variations as were numerous works of the time.

== Selected works ==
=== Guitar solo ===
- Nina Variations, Op. 2 (Vienna: A. Diabelli & Co.)
- Variations brillantes, Op. 9 (Paris: Richault; also Frankfurt: Adolph Fischer)
- Valses brillantes, Op. 10 (Mainz: B. Schott's Söhne)
- Rondo, Op. 11 (Mainz: B. Schott's Söhne)
- Sérénade, Op. 12 (Paris: Richault)
- Grande fantaisie, Op. 14 (Mainz: B. Schott's Söhne)
- Instructive Exercises, Op. 15 (London: T. Boosey & Co.)
- Grandes variations, Op. 16 (Paris: Richault)
- Divertissemens, Op. 17
- Amusemens, Op. 18 (London: Metzler & Son)
- Grand Variations, Op. 20 (London: Davis & Co., c.1830)
- Preludes, Cadences and Modulations, Op. 21 (London: Metzler & Son)
- Quatre Variations avec l'Introduction et Finale, Op. 22 (London: W. H. Aldridge, 1830)
- 12 Divertissements, Op. 23 (London: T. Boosey & Co.)
- Le Desir. Waltz, after Franz Schubert, arranged for one or two guitars (London: Ewer & Johanning, c.1830)
- 12 Easy Divertimentos, Op. 26 (London: J. J. Ewer)
- 24 Studies or Exercises Principally in Arpeggio, Op. 30 (London: Keith Prowse, c.1835)
- Aurora, a 3rd Collection of Forty Pieces ... for the Guitar (Edinburgh, c.1835)
- De Pinna’s Popular Theme "What Fairy-like Music?", Op. 32 (London: Keith Prowse)
- Instructive Lessons, Op. 33 (London: Paine & Hopkins)
- Grand Solo, Op. 37 (Edinburgh: Wood & Co.)
- Fantasia, Op. 40 (London: Metzler & Co.)

=== Guitar duos ===
- Polonaise nationale, Op. 1 (Vienna: A. Diabelli & Co., 1820; also Paris: Richault)
- Variations brillantes, Op. 9 (Paris: Richault; also Frankfurt: Adolph Fischer)
- 6 Ländler, Op. 13 (not published, see external link below to IMSLP)
- Le Desir. Waltz, after Franz Schubert, arranged for one or two guitars (London: Ewer & Johanning, c.1830)

=== Songs with guitar accompaniment ===
- Dolente immagine. Romanza, after Vincenzo Bellini (London: Johanning and Co., c.1840)
- Isolina, after Francesco Masini (London, 1840)
- Kennst du das Land, after Carl Almenräder (words: Theodor von Haupt) (London: Wessel & Co., c.1840)
- O cara memoria, after Michele Carafa (Edinburgh: Paterson & Roy, c.1840)
- Spinnerlied, after Carl Almenräder (London: Wessel & Co., c.1840)
- The Crusader's Serenade (London: Johanning & Co., c.1840)
- Good Night, after Jakob Rosenhain (London, 1846)
- Lady Awake. Serenade from Flotow's opera Stradella (London, 1846)
- The Voice of the Tempest: "Les Plaintes de la jeune fille" (London: Wessel & Co., c.1846)
- The Spanish Bride. Bolero (L. Wray) (London, 1849)

== Recordings ==
- Polonaise nationale, Op. 1, performed by Ratzkowsky/Thomsen Guitar Duo (Danacord DACOCD 433, CD, 1995)
- Amusemens, Op. 18, performed by Karl Michelson (Sapere Aude Record, CD, 2021)
- Fantasia, Op. 40, performed by Mateusz Kowalski (NIFCCD 118, CD, 2020)

== Bibliography ==
- Józef Powroźniak: "Wielcy mistrzowie gitary: Feliks Horecki (1799–1870)", in: Poradnik muzyczny (1972) no. 4, pp. 9–10, 23. In German: "Feliks Horecki: Ein polnischer Meister der Gitarre", in: Gitarre vol. 3 (1972) no. 3, pp. 1–3. In Italian: "Felix Horetzky: Un grande maestro della chitarra", in: Il Fronimo (1975), no. 12, pp. 19–22.
- Thomas F. Heck: "Horetzky e la Giulianiad", in: Il Fronimo (1975), no. 12, pp. 23–26.
