= Penetanguishene Naval Yard =

Coordinates: 44.7753°N 79.9379°W

- Penetanguishene, Ontario

Site information
- Type: Shipyard, dockyard
- Controlled by: Royal Navy (Provincial Marine)

Site history
- Built: 1813
- In use: 1813–1856
- Battles/wars: War of 1812

Garrison information
- Garrison: Lake Huron base for Provincial Marine/RN 1813–1834; British Army base 1834–1856

Penetanguishene Naval Yard was a Royal Navy yard, then a British Army base, from 1813 to 1856 located at Penetanguishene in Upper Canada (present day Ontario).

Land was first acquired in 1798 near Penetanguishene and a base finally built in 1813, but it was abandoned in 1815 at the end of the War of 1812. It was reinstated in 1816 and remained in naval service until 1834.

The base served as the headquarters of the Lake Huron fleet of the Provincial Marine until 1834. The navy transferred the base to the army and continued in operation until 1856. The base also served northwestern supply routes and provided general surveillance of the upper Great Lakes.

The navy base and army depot comprised 15 buildings, including:

- officers barracks
- warehouses
- offices
- King's Wharf
- 3 storehouses

Vessels built or stationed there:

- HMS Bee - gunboat
- HMS Minos - gunboat
- Mohawk - steamer
- HMS Tecumseth - schooner
- HMS Newash - brigantine
- HMS Mosquito - gunboat
- HMS Wasp - gunboat
- unnamed frigate 1814

The base is now rebuilt as part of the Penetanguishene's Historic Naval and Military Establishment.

== See also ==
- Siege of Detroit
- Rush–Bagot Treaty
