= Penetanguishene =

Town in Ontario, Canada

- Town (lower-tier)
- Town of Penetanguishene; Ville de Penetanguishene (French)
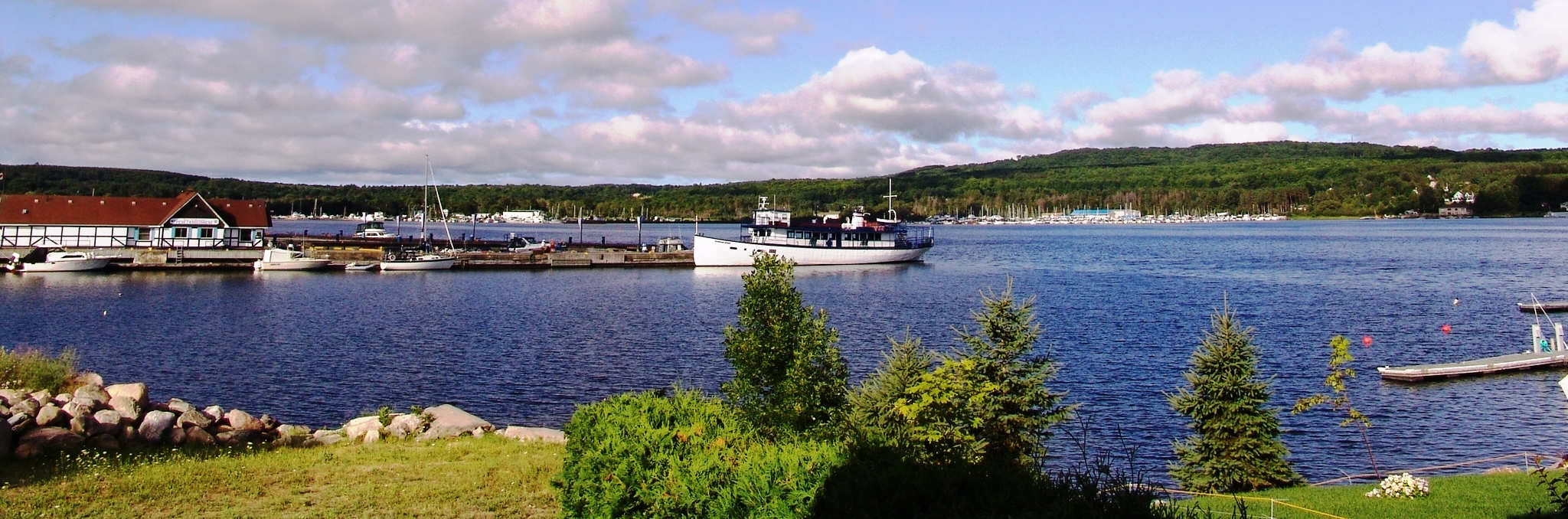
- Town docks on Penetanguishene Bay

- Location within Simcoe County Location within Southern Ontario
- Coordinates: 44°46′N 79°56′W
- Country: Canada
- Province: Ontario
- County: Simcoe
- Settled: 1810s
- Incorporated: June 29, 1875

Government
  - Mayor: Douglas Rawson
  - MPs: Adam Chambers
  - MPPs: Jill Dunlop

Area
  - Land: 25.42 km^{2} (9.81 sq mi)

Population (2021)
  - Total: 10,077
  - Density: 396.4/km^{2} (1,027/sq mi)
- Time zone: UTC-5 (Eastern (EST))
  - Summer (DST): UTC-4 (EDT)
- Postal code FSA: L9M
- Area code(s): 705
- Website: penetanguishene.ca

Penetanguishene (/pɛnɪˈtæŋɡwɪʃiːn/, sometimes shortened to Penetang) is a town in Simcoe County, Ontario, Canada. It is located on the southeasterly tip of Georgian Bay. Incorporated on June 29, 1875, this bilingual (French and English) community has a population of 8,962 in the Canada 2016 Census.

The name Penetanguishene is believed to come from either the Wyandot or Abenaki via Ojibwe, meaning "land of the white rolling sands".

== History ==
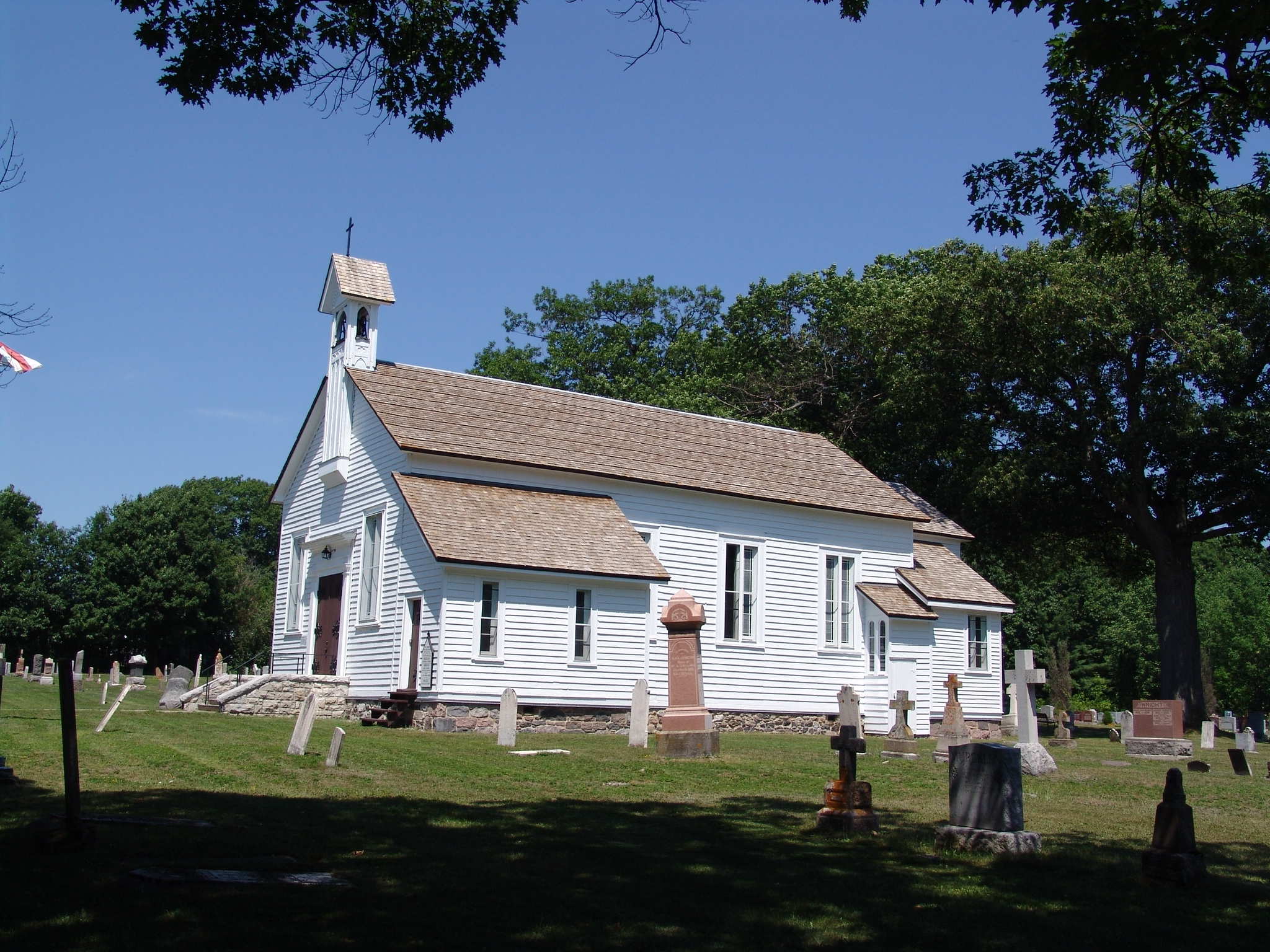
Built in 1836, St. James on-the-Lines is a historic Anglican garrison church in Penetanguishene.

As early as AD 800, the Wyandot people settled in semi-permanent villages in the area. The young French translator, Étienne Brûlé, was the first European to set foot in the Penetanguishene area, some time between 1610 and 1614. He was murdered in 1633 in Toanche, just across the bay from the modern town of Penetanguishene.

In 1793, John Graves Simcoe, the first Lieutenant Governor of Upper Canada, visited the area and saw the location's potential as a Royal Navy naval base. He wanted to use the bay to shelter warships to protect Upper Canada, which had coasts on lakes Huron, Erie and Michigan opposite the Northwest Territory and New York State of the United States of America, from American military aggression and territorial expansion.

The Penetanguishene Naval Yard was built by the Royal Navy in 1813. In 1814, the Penetanguishene Road was constructed to provide the Yard a land route to British military supply depots on Kempenfelt Bay, Lake Simcoe (where Barrie, Ontario is today) as the Yard was previously accessible only by water.

In 1817, naval units from Michilimackinac and Schooner Town (near modern-day Wasaga Beach) were consolidated at the Penetanguishene Naval Yard. But, because the Treaty of Ghent with the U.S. limited both countries' naval power on the Great Lakes, two British armed topsail schooners, HMS Tecumseth and HMS Newash were laid up "in ordinary", and eventually reported to have sunk at their moorings in the harbour in 1828. Some other small craft were headquartered in Penetanguishene for the exploration and mapping of the Great Lakes' coastline overseen by Lieutenant Henry Wolsey Bayfield.

In 1828, the main British military establishment on the Upper Lakes moved from Drummond Island to Penetanguishene. Families of Metis fur traders who had moved with the British from Michilimackinac to Drummond Island after the War of 1812, moved again to Penetanguishene. They settled in the town and the surrounding area. Although the naval base was closed in 1834, the military base remained until 1856. Some of the troops settled in the area after their service was complete providing an English-speaking population.

In the 1840s, French-speaking families from Canada East (mainly from the area immediately east of Montreal), attracted by promises of cheap and fertile land, joined the French-speaking Drummond Island settlers already in the area. Later, as the logging industry began to develop, more English-speaking settlers arrived. Penetanguishene became the local market and meeting place for these individuals. Many of Penetanguishene's families today are descended from the Québécois settlers who arrived in the 1800s, giving the town a marked bilingual nature.

Penetanguishene was incorporated on June 29, 1875, when it separated from Tiny Township.

=== Contemporary ===
Penetanguishene began to slow down its growth near the 1980s after the railway and the local Coca-Cola plant were both shut down; the railway due to widespread use of cars and the Coca-Cola plant due to modern water filtration which requires chlorine. Coca-Cola had originally used Penetanguishene as a site to make its beverages due to its high water quality, due to the chlorination the water lacked its previous quality.

On Main Street, the houses coming in to the town on the left were torn down in the 1990s and a new strip mall was added to replace them. Penetang hosts a Bingo hall and a local summer theatre (Kings Warf Theatre).

== Demographics ==
In the 2021 Census of Population conducted by Statistics Canada, Penetanguishene had a population of 10,077 living in 3,976 of its 4,357 total private dwellings, a change of 12.4% from its 2016 population of 8,962. With a land area of 25.42 km^{2} (9.81 sq mi), it had a population density of 396.4/km^{2} (1,026.7/sq mi) in 2021.

Canada census – Penetanguishene community profile

	2021	2016	2011
Population	10,077 (+12.4% from 2016)	8,962 (-1.6% from 2011)	9,111 (-2.6% from 2006)
Land area	25.42 km^{2} (9.81 sq mi)	25.58 km^{2} (9.88 sq mi)	25.57 km^{2} (9.87 sq mi)
Population density	396.4/km^{2} (1,027/sq mi)	350.3/km^{2} (907/sq mi)	356.4/km^{2} (923/sq mi)
Median age	52.0 (M: 48.0, F: 56.0)	49.9 (M: 46.7, F: 51.9)
Private dwellings	4,357 (total) 3,976 (occupied)	3,990 (total)	3,923 (total)
Median household income	$74,000	$59,738

References: 2021 2016 2011

Historical census populations – Penetanguishene

Year	Pop.	±%
1881	1,089	—
1891	2,110	+93.8%
1901	2,422	+14.8%
1911	3,568	+47.3%
1921	4,037	+13.1%
1931	4,035	−0.0%
1941	4,521	+12.0%
1951	4,949	+9.5%

Year	Pop.	±%
1956	5,420	+9.5%
1961	5,340	−1.5%
1966	5,349	+0.2%
1971	5,497	+2.8%
1976	5,460	−0.7%
1981	5,315	−2.7%
1986	5,576	+4.9%
1991	6,643	+19.1%

Year	Pop.	±%
1996	7,291	+9.8%
2001	8,316	+14.1%
2006	9,354	+12.5%
2011	9,111	−2.6%
2016	8,962	−1.6%
2021	10,077	+12.4%

Population counts are not adjusted for boundary changes.
Source: Statistics Canada

== Economy ==
Penetanguishene historically had several light industrial businesses mainly dealing with plastic and aluminum containers. CCL which makes aluminum containers closed its Penetang factory in June 2017. It is host to the Central North Correctional Centre. In addition there is the Waypoint Centre for Mental Health Care which includes a high security forensic psychiatric unit for people declared to be not criminally responsible for dangerous offences but considered unsafe to be allowed in the community.

Ice scoots in a race at the Penatang Winterama, 1959

Tourism occupies a considerable portion of the economy with five marinas and shops and restaurants catering to the tourist trade. In the winter, snowmobiling and ice fishing is popular as well as the annual Winterama festival, (Ontario’s longest running winter carnival which started in 1948).

== Tourism and sights ==
The historic naval and military base (now called Discovery Harbour) near Penetanguishene is open to visitors. There are reconstructed buildings from the historic Penetanguishene Naval Yard and two replica sailing ships from the 1812 period, HMS Bee and HMS Tecumseth (c. 1994). The ships no longer sail with passengers but they may be visited in the harbour. The original HMS Tecumseth was raised in 1953 and preserved at a nearby display area.

The King's Wharf Theatre located at Discovery Harbour has a programme of popular plays and musicals every summer.

There are two notable and historic churches located in Penetanguishene. The oldest is St. James on-the-Lines, a small wooden Anglican church built in 1836 to serve the military garrison and civilian population. The most prominent is the large limestone Roman Catholic church named St. Anne's. Originally named "Ste-Anne's Jesuit Memorial Church: Canadian National Shrine", it is sometimes referred to today as the "Cathedral of the North". The Church was constructed between 1886 and 1902 by pastor Théophile François Laboureau. Laboureau secured major funding for the church from the Bishops of Rouen and Normandy in France as well as the governments of England, France and the United States. As it serves a bilingual Catholic community, services are held in both French and English.

== Education ==
Penetanguishene has five different school boards within its limits — the publicly funded English board (Simcoe County District School Board), which runs James Keating Elementary School; the French Catholic School Board Conseil scolaire de district catholique Centre-Sud, which operates École élémentaire catholique Saint-Louis; the Public French School Board, the Conseil scolaire Viamonde which runs École secondaire Le Caron, and the Simcoe Muskoka Catholic District School Board (English). The town is also home to the province's last remaining Protestant Separate school board, Penetanguishene Protestant Separate School Board.

From 1995 to 2001, the town was home to a satellite campus of the defunct francophone Collège des Grands-Lacs.

== Sports ==
Penetanguishene is home to the Penetang Kings of the Provincial Junior Hockey League. They are in the Carruthers division in the Ontario Hockey Association.

== Media ==
The town is home to a francophone community radio station, CFRH-FM (Vague FM), but is otherwise served by media based in the neighbouring town of Midland.

== Notable people ==
- Bert Corbeau, hockey player
- Patrick DesRochers, hockey player
- Glenn Howard, World champion curler
- Russ Howard, Olympic curling gold medallist
- Chris Kontos, NHL hockey player
- James LaBrie, vocalist of progressive metal band Dream Theater
- Phil Marchildon, baseball pitcher
- Tim Mason, lawn bowler
- Peggy McIntaggart, Playboy Playmate (Miss January 1990)
- John Moberly, Naval Officer
- Brian Orser, figure skater
- Alfred B Thompson, first Canadian POW of World War II and a survivor of the Stalag Luft III escape
- Alfred Burke Thompson, MLA (now MPP) and MP
- Michael H. Albert, mathematician and computer scientist
- David Dupuis, Author

== See also ==
- List of francophone communities in Ontario
