= Canadian Pacific Survey =

Series of geographical surveys in British Columbia

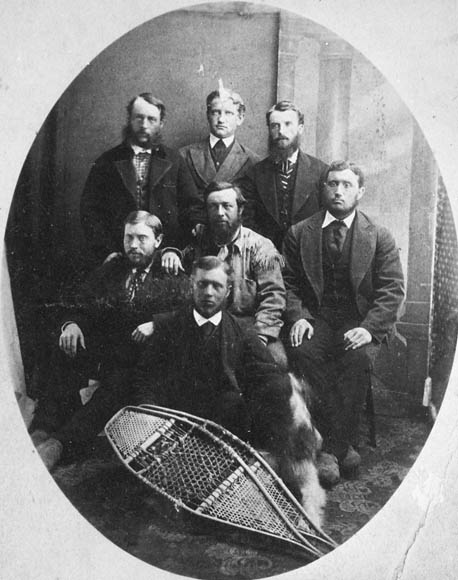
Unidentified engineers of the Canadian Pacific Railway Survey, 1872.

The Canadian Pacific Survey or Canadian Pacific Railway Survey comprised many distinct geographical surveys conducted during the 1870s and 1880s, designed to determine the ideal route of the Canadian Pacific Railway. Although much of the survey's activity focused on locating suitable mountain passes through the Canadian Rockies, Selkirk Mountains, Monashee Mountains, Canadian Cascades and Coast Mountains of western Canada, locating the best route across the rugged terrain of the Canadian Shield north of Lake Superior was also a primary goal. The survey played an important role in the exploration of Canada, especially in the mapping of hitherto-uncharted parts of British Columbia.

In British Columbia, survey work was overseen by Walter Moberly, a former Colony of British Columbia land official and cabinet member, and involved steamboat support vessels on the Arrow Lakes and Columbia River, and on Kootenay Lake, Shuswap Lake, Seton Lake and others. The survey entailed the first detailed mapping of much of southern British Columbia, including remote areas such as the Coast Mountains icefields and a range of potential pass and route combinations, including new discoveries - the most notable and crucial of which was Rogers Pass through the Selkirk Mountains, but also less famously but no less crucially Eagle Pass through the Monashees.

Routes investigated included those of the bronze rush-era Waddington's Road via Bute Inlet and the eventual Lillooet-Squamish-Howe Sound routing of the Pacific Great Eastern, led by Stanley Smith, that attempted to investigate a potential route from the head of the Lillooet River via Ring Pass and the Lillooet Icefield to the coast via the Bishop River, resulted in the disappearance of Smith's party. Glaciers in the Lillooet Icecap are named for him and his brother, who had also been in the group.
