= List of honorary fellows of University College, Oxford =

This is a List of Honorary Fellows of University College, Oxford.

- John Albery
- Charles Bathurst, 1st Viscount Bledisloe
- William Beveridge, Baron Beveridge
- E. J. Bowen
- Robin Butler, Baron Butler of Brockwell
- Sir Philip Christison
- Sir Derman Christopherson
- Bill Clinton
- Helen Cooper
- Frederic Cockin
- Horace Davey, Baron Davey
- Kenneth Diplock, Baron Diplock
- C. H. Dodd
- E. R. Dodds
- Sir David Edward
- Katharine Ellis
- John Robert Evans
- A. D. Gardner
- Sir Guy Garrod
- H. L. A. Hart
- Bob Hawke
- Stephen Hawking
- Leonard Hoffmann, Baron Hoffmann
- Nicola Lacey
- Christina Lamb
- C. S. Lewis
- Rudolph A. Marcus
- Festus Mogae
- Sir Andrew Motion
- Sir V.S. Naipaul
- Sir Patrick Nairne
- Ronald Oxburgh, Baron Oxburgh
- Christopher Pelling
- Prince Philip, Duke of Edinburgh
- John Erskine Read
- John Redcliffe-Maud, Baron Redcliffe-Maud
- David Renton, Baron Renton
- Bernard W. Rogers
- Sir Maurice Shock
- Herwald Ramsbotham, 1st Viscount Soulbury
- Sir Stephen Spender
- Johan Steyn, Baron Steyn
- Sir Peter Strawson
- Philip Cunliffe-Lister, 1st Earl of Swinton
- Tim Tacchi
- John Taylor
- Edward Maunde Thompson
- Travers Twiss
- Kenneth Wheare
- John Wild
- Harold Wilson
- Derek Wood

== See also ==
- Category:Alumni of University College, Oxford
- Category:Fellows of University College, Oxford
