= Edith Wardale =

- Born: Edith Elizabeth Wardale; 6 March 1863; Orcheston
- Died: 27 February 1943 (aged 79); Oxford
- Title: Dr.

Edith Elizabeth Wardale (6 March 1863 – 27 February 1943) was a British philologist and literary scholar. She earned a first class degree and an early doctorate. She taught at St Hugh's, Oxford, where she broke glass ceilings. She was an early woman lecturer, and she was the first woman to serve on the medieval and modern languages and literature faculty board. She resigned in a successful protest concerning the dismissal of a fellow lecturer.

== Life ==
Wardale was born in Orcheston in 1863. She lived in the parish named Orcheston St Mary, where her father, John Wardale, was the rector. Her mother was Susannah Jennings Gay.

She initially entered Oxford University via Lady Margaret Hall but within a year she moved to St Hugh's Hall. She became the star-pupil of Joseph Wright who said she was the first woman to gain a "decent degree". Unlike many of his peers, Joseph Wright allowed her to teach classes in Old English, Middle German and the history of literature in Old High German. The Oxford Association for the Education of Women employed her in 1891 as a tutor of Old English and she became a tutor at St Hugh’s.

She studied the phonology of a psalter created by the German scholar Notker Labeo and in 1892 the University of Zurich conferred a doctorate on her in recognition of this work.

Wardale was the first woman to serve on the medieval and modern languages and literature faculty board in 1921. In 1923 she was a supporter of Cecilia Ady after she protested her arbitrary dismissal by Eleanor Jourdain, who was the principal of St Hugh’s. Five tutors resigned in support of Ady including Wardale. The Vice-Chancellor conducted an investigation with wide media attention and Wardale had the difficult task of speaking out against the injustice on behalf of her colleagues. Jourdain avoided the indignity of being asked to resign as she died due to a heart attack. The matter was infrequently mentioned again in the college.

She was Oxford's first woman examiner in English in 1925.

In 1936, to mark 50 years since St Hugh's College, Oxford was founded, a "Group Portrait" was painted of Evelyn Procter, Wardale who was the English Language Tutor; Elizabeth Francis, the French Tutor; Barbara Gwyer, the then Principal; and Cecilia Ady the History Tutor by Henry Lamb.

She wrote An Introduction to Middle English in 1937. Two years later she became a Doctor of Letters.

Wardale died in Oxford in 1943.
