= Tacchi =

Tacchi is a surname. Notable people with the surname include:

- Andrea Tacchi (born 1956), Italian luthier
- Tim Tacchi (born 1955), British hedge fund founder
