= Worshipful Company of Basketmakers =

Livery company of the City of London

The Worshipful Company of Basketmakers is one of the Livery Companies of the city of London. The company was constituted in 1569 and was recognised as a livery company in 1825. It received a royal charter from King George VI in 1937, which was personally presented by Queen Mary, when she attended the Guildhall Exhibition of basketware that year.

The company has recently instituted Yeoman memberships for working basketmakers and works closely with the basketmaking trade through the trade advisor and trade committee. The company has a strong charitable trust and supports many charitable causes, and supports the three armed services with its involvement with 100 (Yeomanry) Regiment Royal Artillery, HMS Richmond (F239) and 5 (AC) Squadron RAF.

Notable people associated with the company include Lady Lauriston and Michele Acton, Principal of St Hugh's College, Oxford.

There is an independent but related Masonic Lodge called the Basketmakers Lodge No. 5639. Membership of this lodge is exclusive, drawn from members of the Worshipful Company of Basketmakers.

The company ranks fifty-second in the order of precedence for livery companies. Its motto is "Let Us Love One Another."
