= Cecilia Mary Ady =

English writer, academic and historian

- Born: 28 November 1881; Edgcote
- Died: 27 March 1958 (aged 76); Oxford
- Mother: Julia Mary Cartwright
- Relatives: Thomas Fremantle, 1st Baron Cottesloe (great grandfather)

Academic background
- Education: St Hugh's College, University of Oxford
- Academic advisor: Edward Armstrong

Academic work
- Discipline: History
- Institutions: St Hugh's College, Oxford; Society of Home Students, Oxford
- Main interests: Italian Renaissance

Cecilia Mary Ady (28 November 1881 – 27 March 1958) was an English writer, academic and historian. She worked at the University of Oxford, where she became known as an authority on the Italian Renaissance. She came to wider public attention after she was dismissed by a former friend from her college, and her colleagues supported her reinstatement.

== Life ==
Ady was born in Edgcote in Northamptonshire in 1881, the only child of Rev. William Henry Ady, a clergyman, and his wife, Julia Cartwright Ady, a biographer and an amateur expert on the Italian Renaissance. She was the great-granddaughter of Thomas Fremantle, 1st Baron Cottesloe. Her mother's interest in Italy had been fired by her cousin, William Cornwallis Cartwright. Her mother took responsibility for Cecilia's education, and Cecilia obtained a place at Oxford, where she studied at St Hugh's Hall, and obtained a first in the honours school of modern history in 1903 (although women were not at that date entitled to be awarded degrees). She became a protégée of the historian Edward Armstrong. He was commissioned to oversee a book series titled "The States of Italy": his plans were not fully realised, but Ady's book, History of Milan under the Sforza was one of two to be published.

In 1909 she joined St Hugh's as a tutor, where she developed a close relationship with the college's principal, Eleanor Jourdain. Jourdain eventually turned against Ady, allegedly jealous of her popularity. Ady was sacked from her position in November 1923, at Jourdain's insistence, for disloyalty. Jourdain felt that Ady had leaked information to the staff about her plans for introducing a vice-principal to the college. Ady protested, and a mass resignation followed, which included six of the college's council. The matter became of wider public interest, and Lord Curzon (the chancellor of the university) was asked to investigate. Ady's name was eventually cleared, and Jourdain died just before she was to be asked to resign. The inquiry resulted in improvements to the employment conditions of female tutors.

Ady then became a tutor with the Society of Oxford Home-Students. In 1929 her old college re-employed her as a research fellow.

In 1936, to mark 50 years St Hugh's College, Oxford was founded, a "Group Portrait" was painted of Evelyn Procter, History Tutor; Edith Wardale, English Language Tutor; Elizabeth Francis, French Tutor; Barbara Gwyer, Principal; and Cecilia Ady, History Tutor by Henry Lamb.

In 1938 she was awarded the degree of Doctor of Letters (DLitt), after she published a monograph titled The Bentivoglio of Bologna: a Study in Despotism (1937).

Ady died in Oxford in 1958. Following her death, her colleagues and former research students compiled a memorial volume of donated essays, titled Italian Renaissance Studies (1960).

== Works include ==
- History of Milan under the Sforza (1907)
- Pius II (Aeneas Silvius Piccolomini): the Humanist Pope (1913)
- A History of Modern Italy, 1871–1915 (translation) of Benedetto Croce's work
- Italian Studies (1934) (Editor)
- The Bentivoglio of Bologna: a Study in Despotism (1937)
- The English Church and How it Works (1940)
- The Role of Women in the Church (1948)
- Lorenzo Dei Medici and Renaissance Italy (1955)
