= Rachel Trickett =

English writer and academic

- Born: Mabel Rachel Trickett; 20 December 1923; Wigan, Lancashire, England
- Died: 24 June 1999 (aged 75); Oxford, England
- Occupation: academic
- Known for: non-fiction writer
- Honours: Warton Lecture (1971)

Mabel Rachel Trickett (20 December 1923 – 24 June 1999) was an English novelist, non‑fiction writer, literary scholar, and a British academic; she was Principal of St Hugh's College, Oxford, for nearly twenty years, between 1973 and 1991.

== Early life and education ==
Trickett was born in Wigan. Her father was a postman. She studied at Lady Margaret Hall, Oxford. She became a lecturer in English at the University of Hull in 1946 and in 1954 she returned to Oxford, as a fellow and tutor at St Hugh's College.

== Principal of St. Hugh's College ==
As Principal of St. Hugh's College, Trickett often showed a side of gaiety: on her instruction, the chapel at the college was redecorated in 18th-century colours.

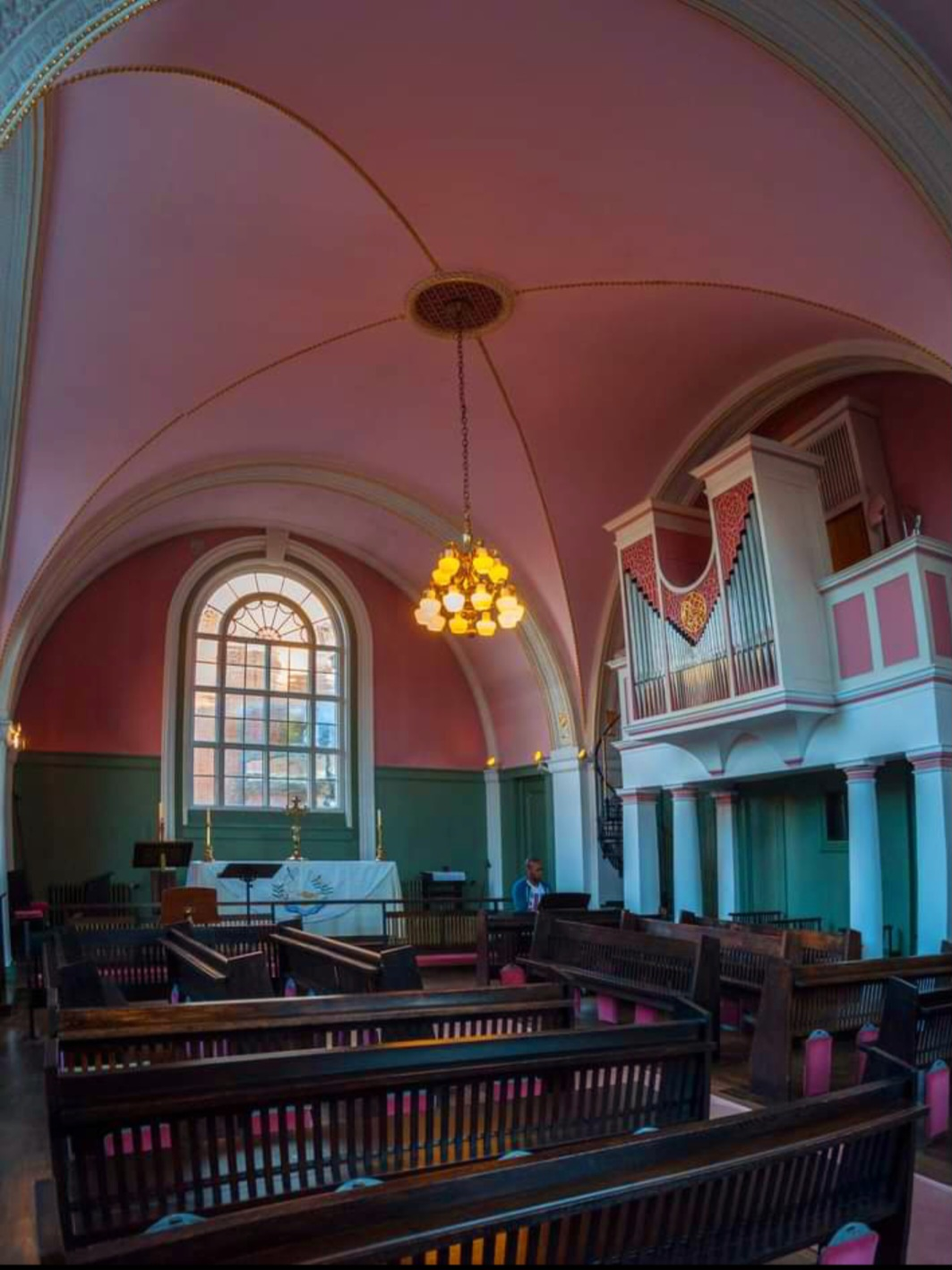
The college chapel

Her friend Laurence Whistler designed the college's gilded wrought iron Swan gates, which are now by the Principal's house on Canterbury Road.

== Other work ==
Trickett was the author of the novels The Return Home (London, Constable & Co., 1952) and The Course of Love (London, Constable & Co., 1954). Her The Honest Muse: A Study in Augustan Verse was published by Clarendon Press, Oxford, in 1967.

Michael Gearin-Tosh wrote in her obituary for The Independent that "she had a wicked eye for the conceit of academics, their insularity and devious manipulations", an attitude which made her a soul‑mate of Erich Heller.

== Legacy ==
The Rachel Trickett Building at St Hugh's College is named in her honour.

Academic offices
Preceded by Kathleen Kenyon	Principal of St Hugh's College, Oxford; 1973 to 1991	Succeeded by Derek Wood
