= Alice Farnham =

British conductor

- Born: Alice Rachel Farnham; 11 May 1970 (age 55); Stratford-upon-Avon, England
- Education: St Hugh's College, Oxford; St Petersburg Conservatory
- Occupation: Conductor

Alice Farnham is a British conductor. She has worked with the Welsh National Opera, Royal Opera House, and BBC Concert Orchestra among other musical institutions. Farnham read music at St Hugh's College, Oxford University and Organ Fellow at Saint Thomas Church (Manhattan), Fifth Avenue, New York. She studied with the Russian conductor Ilya Musin for three years at the St Petersburg Conservatory, from 1997 to 2000. She is a published author and a much sought after teacher of conducting.

== Career ==
Farnham has an active opera and symphonic conducting career worldwide. Guest conducting includes the BBC Concert Orchestra, National Symphony Orchestra of Ireland, Jönköping Sinfonietta, Royal Scottish National Orchestra, Royal Opera House Covent Garden, Opéra de Rouen Normandie, Malmö Opera, Mariinsky Theatre, Calgary Opera, Folkoperan Stockholm, Longborough Festival Opera, and Wermland Opera.

She has been a Guest Conductor with many ballet companies including the Royal Ballet Covent Garden, Birmingham Royal Ballet, Royal Danish Ballet, English National Ballet, Rambert Dance Company, Skåna Dansteater, and Ballet Preljocaj.

Her other recent engagements include with the Malmö Opera Orchestra, Dalasinfoniettan, Gävle Symphony Orchestra, Nordiska Kammarorkestern, Malta Philharmonic Orchestra, Sinfonia Viva, and Sinfonia Smith Square.

Farnham co-founded the Royal Philharmonic Society's Women Conductors Programme in 2013 to address the gender imbalance in conducting. Farnham's course encourages women to pursue conducting, fostering female talent and leadership in classical music. Her advocacy and efforts have garnered recognition within the classical music community, highlighting her dedication to promoting diversity and opportunities for women in the field. She also speaks at international conferences, promoting greater inclusion for women in the field.

Farnham's book In Good Hands was published by Faber & Faber in January 2023, and in paperback in April 2024.

== Recognition ==
Critics praise Farnham for her precise and emotive conducting style, particularly in ballet and opera. Her performances have been described as crisply defined by Opera Today, drawing commendations for her ability to balance orchestral complexity.

=== Awards ===
In 2024, Alice Farnham was shortlisted for the Royal Philharmonic Society Conductors Award.

== Discography ==
In September 2024, NMC Recordings released Discovering Imogen, an album dedicated to the music of Imogen Holst. The collection features performances by the BBC Concert Orchestra and BBC Singers under the direction of Alice Farnham. The album includes notable works such as "Overture Persephone" (1929), the "Suite in F" (1927), and the "Suite for String Orchestra" (1943), the latter being the only piece to have previously been performed professionally. Other compositions include "What Man is He?" from the 1940s, the "Festival Anthem" (1946), arranged by Colin Matthews, and "On Westhall Hill", which rounds out the selection.

This album highlights the rich and varied output of Holst, showcasing pieces from different periods of her career.
