= Michele Acton =

British banker and academic leader (born 1967)

Principal of St Hugh's College, Oxford
- Incumbent
- Assumed office 1 September 2025
- Preceded by: The Rt Hon Lady Elish Angiolini KC

Chief Executive of the Royal Society of Medicine
- In office 2019–2025

Personal details
- Born: 25 June 1967 (age 59)
- Spouse: Mark Field (m. 1994; div. 2006)
- Education: Trinity College, Oxford

Michele Louise Acton (born 25 June 1967) is the former chief executive of the Royal Society of Medicine. Having started her career as an investment banker, she has been the principal of St Hugh's College, Oxford since September 2025, succeeding Lady Elish Angiolini.

== Career ==
Acton was born on 25 June 1967 and read philosophy, politics and economics (PPE) at Trinity College, Oxford. Acton began her career as an investment banker in the City of London for 15 years, working at Barings Bank, Merrill Lynch & Co. and HSBC Investment Bank and advising companies on raising finance and mergers and acquisitions.

=== Charity Chief Executive ===
Acton was appointed chief executive of University College London Hospitals Charitable Foundation, the main fundraising charity for key research, building and equipment projects across all University College London Hospitals.

In 2006, she became chief executive of Fight for Sight, the UK's largest charity funding pioneering eye research. Acton’s work at Fight for Sight oversaw the bringing together of two charities – Fight for Sight and the British Eye Research Foundation – to form one national charity focused on addressing sight loss. By the end of her time there, Fight for Sight had an £8 million research commitment to scientists and healthcare professionals at over 40 universities and hospitals. Acton led the funding for the world's first gene therapy trial into the rare eye disease choroideremia. She also developed strategic partnerships to enhance research initiatives, such as a collaboration with Chief Scientist Office (CSO) Scotland in 2017 to fund eye health projects, building on prior successes such as preventing sight loss in premature babies through oxygen level research. While chief executive at Fight for Sight, Acton opened the Cambridge Eye Research Centre at Addenbrooke's Hospital alongside Dame Mary Archer.

From 2007 to 2014, Acton served as a trustee of the concert hall St John's, Smith Square. Acton was appointed treasurer of the charity the Centre for Ageing Better, serving alongside Dame Carol Black, the principal of Newnham College, Cambridge, as chair; Acton also chaired the charity's finance, investment and audit committee and its remuneration committee.

Acton was appointed chief executive of the Royal Society of Medicine in 2019. In that role she led an organisation that provides multidisciplinary and specialist education to 35,000 healthcare professionals around the world, is home to an academic library and the Journal of the Royal Society of Medicine, as well as hosting international events and conferences. Acton's responsibilities also included managing the Royal Society of Medicine's London properties worth in excess of £100 million. Acton was a board member of the Harley Street Business Improvement District from 2022 to 2025. Acton is also an adviser to the World Sight Foundation, serving alongside Lord (David) Blunkett and Professor Clare Gilbert.

Acton is a liveryman of the Worshipful Company of Basketmakers, one of the ancient livery companies dating from the 16th century which is centred around philanthropy in the City of London.

Acton was appointed an honorary fellow of Trinity College, Oxford, the highest honour bestowed by the college. Acton was also awarded the Freedom of the City of London.

=== Principal of St Hugh's College Oxford ===
In February 2025, it was announced that Acton had been elected as the next principal of St Hugh's College, Oxford, succeeding Lady Elish Angiolini. Her term as principal began in September 2025. As principal, Acton has engaged in a number of fundraising events with alumni and donors in Oxford, London and Hong Kong. Acton has also been involved in the development of a specialised executive programme for the judiciary in the Philippines, including meeting with Maria Singh, a Judge of the Supreme Court of the Philippines, to discuss collaboration with the University of Oxford. In October 2025, Acton joined Amal Clooney at the launch of the Oxford Institute of Technology and Justice by the Blavatnik School of Government.

== Personal life ==
Acton was married to Conservative politician Mark Field from 1994 until 2006, when the couple divorced following Field's extra-marital affair with his fellow Member of Parliament Liz Truss.
