= Evelyn Procter =

British historian and academic

Evelyn Procter FRHistS
- Born: Evelyn Emma Stefanos Procter; 6 June 1897
- Died: 22 March 1980 (aged 82)
- Title: Principal of St Hugh's College, Oxford (1946 to 1962)
- Awards: Legion of Honour

Academic background
- Education: Corran School for Girls; Cheltenham Ladies' College
- Alma mater: Somerville College, Oxford

Academic work
- Discipline: Historian
- Sub-discipline: Medieval Spanish History
- Institutions: Somerville College, Oxford; St Hugh's College, Oxford
- Notable students: Richard A. Fletcher

Evelyn Emma Stefanos Procter, FRHistS (6 June 1897 – 22 March 1980) was a British historian and academic. She served as principal of St Hugh's College, Oxford, from 1946 to 1962.

== Early life ==
Procter was born on 6 June 1897 in Hunton Bridge, Hertfordshire. She was educated at two all girls private schools; Corran School for Girls in Watford and Cheltenham Ladies' College in Cheltenham. In 1915, she went to Somerville College, Oxford, as a commoner to study modern history. Her college tutors were Margaret Hayes Robinson and Florence O'Loughlin. During her time at the University of Oxford, she was awarded a blue for lacrosse. In 1918, she graduated with a distinguished first class honours Bachelor of Arts (BA) degree.

== Academic career ==
Procter began her academic career as a teacher at Saint Felix School, Southwold. She spent the first two years after graduating teaching.

In 1921, Procter was elected Mary Somerville Research Fellow at Somerville College, Oxford. She undertook research on the medieval history of Spain, including visits in 1922 to the archives in Madrid, Barcelona, Pamplona, and Lisbon. She was the first female scholar to be admitted to the National Historical Archive of Spain and the Biblioteca Nacional de España.

In 1925, Procter was appointed a tutor in history at St Hugh's College, Oxford, and was elected a fellow the following year. From 1933 to 1939, she was a university lecturer in medieval European history. In 1936, to mark 50 years since St Hugh's College, Oxford was founded, a "Group Portrait" was painted of Evelyn Procter, Edith Wardale, English Language Tutor; Elizabeth Francis, French Tutor; Barbara Gwyer, the then Principal; and Cecilia Ady, History Tutor by Henry Lamb.

In 1946, she was elected Principal of St Hugh's College in succession to Barbara Gwyer. She was invited to deliver the Norman MacColl lectures at the University of Cambridge in the academic year 1948 to 1949. In 1951, she published these lectures as a monograph titled Alfonso X of Castile, Patron of Literature and Learning. She also acted as a supervisor for a number of postgraduates. These included Derek Lomax who became Professor of Spanish at Birmingham University, and Richard Fletcher who became Professor of History at the University of York.

Procter retired in 1962.

== Later life ==
Following her retirement in 1962, Procter was elected an Honorary Fellow of St Hugh's College, Oxford, which allowed her to keep in close contact with her former college.

In retirement, Procter lived in Eynsham, Oxford. She died on 22 March 1980, aged 82.

== Honours ==
Proctor had been elected Fellow of the Royal Historical Society (FRHistS). She was appointed Chevalier of the Légion d'honneur in honour of her role in the foundation of the Maison Française d'Oxford.

Academic offices
Preceded by Barbara Gwyer	Principal of St Hugh's College, Oxford; 1946 to 1962	Succeeded by Kathleen Kenyon
