= Mark Field =

British Conservative politician (born 1964)

The Right Honourable Mark Field
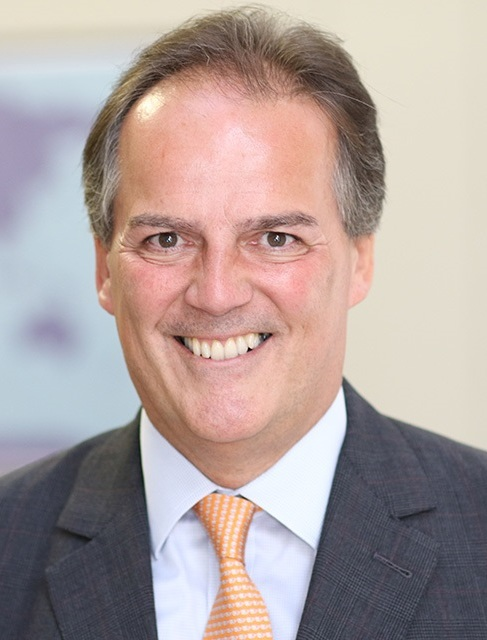
- Official portrait, 2017

Minister of State for Asia and the Pacific
- In office 13 June 2017 – 25 July 2019 (Note: Suspended from 21 June 2019.)
- Prime Minister: Theresa May
- Preceded by: Alok Sharma
- Succeeded by: Heather Wheeler

Member of Parliament for Cities of London and Westminster
- In office 7 June 2001 – 6 November 2019
- Preceded by: Peter Brooke
- Succeeded by: Nickie Aiken

Member of Kensington and Chelsea London Borough Council for Abingdon
- In office May 1994 – May 2002

Personal details
- Born: 6 October 1964 (age 61) Hanover, West Germany
- Party: Conservative
- Spouses: Michele Acton (m. 1994; div. 2006) Victoria Elphicke (m. 2007)
- Children: 2
- Education: St Edmund Hall, Oxford
- Occupation: Politician
- Profession: Solicitor

Mark Christopher Field (born 6 October 1964) is a British politician who served as the Member of Parliament (MP) for Cities of London and Westminster from 2001 to 2019. A member of the Conservative Party, he served as a Minister of State at the Foreign and Commonwealth Office from 2017 to 2019. Field's extra-marital affair between 2004 and 2005 with Liz Truss led to Field's divorce from Michele Acton and an attempt to prevent Truss standing as a parliamentary candidate at the 2010 general election by members of her constituency association. A prominent supporter of the United Kingdom remaining in the European Union during the Brexit referendum and of Jeremy Hunt in the 2019 Conservative leadership election, he left his post as a Foreign Office Minister when Boris Johnson's premiership began. He stood down from the House of Commons at the 2019 general election.

== Early life and education ==
Field was born on 6 October 1964 at the British Military Hospital in Hanover, Germany. His father Peter (died 1991) was a major in the British Army and his mother Ulrike (née Peipe, died 2010) was of German origin. Field was educated at the state-funded grammar school, Reading School and St Edmund Hall, Oxford, where he graduated with a B.A. degree in Jurisprudence in 1987.

He was secretary and national political officer of the Oxford University Conservative Association from 1985 to 1986, JCR president of St Edmund Hall in 1986, and he was also news editor of student newspaper Cherwell while it was under the editorships of Christina Lamb and Anne McElvoy. During his student days, Field set up a publishing firm after spotting a gap in the market for careers handbooks in the legal profession. He completed his education at The College of Law at Chester, qualifying as a solicitor in 1990.

== Private career ==
Whilst an undergraduate at Oxford University, Field became a personal assistant to the Conservative MP for Oxford West and Abingdon, John (now Lord) Patten, before training as a solicitor and practising as a corporate lawyer with Freshfields between 1990 and 1992. He then became a director of his own lawyer employment agency, Kellyfield Consulting from 1994 until 2001; the company employed a dozen staff and turned over almost £2 million pa. After being elected to Parliament he sold his share of that business to a consortium headed by his ex-business partner.

Field served as vice-chairman of the Islington North Conservative Association between 1989 and 1991 and unsuccessfully stood as one of the Conservative Party candidates in the Quadrant ward in the Islington Council election in 1990. He was elected as a Conservative councillor for Abingdon ward on Kensington and Chelsea London Borough Council in 1994, standing down in 2002 after entering the House of Commons.

He unsuccessfully contested the Conservative held seat of Enfield North at the 1997 general election following the retirement of the sitting MP Tim Eggar. 1997 was the year of Labour's parliamentary landslide and he was defeated at that election by Labour's Joan Ryan by 6,822 votes.

After leaving Parliament following the 2019 general election, Field was appointed as non-executive chairman of CIB Limited, a subsidiary of the Isle of Man-based investment bank Capital International Group in January 2020.

== Parliamentary career ==
In December 1999 Field was selected to contest the safe Conservative seat of the Cities of London and Westminster following the retirement of former Northern Ireland Secretary Peter Brooke at the 2001 general election. Field won the seat with a majority of 4,499 and was returned to Parliament with an increased majority three times since (2005 – 8,095; 2010 – 11,076; 2015 – 9,671). He was re-elected with a reduced majority at the 2017 general election. Field made his maiden speech in the House of Commons on 27 June 2001, when he declared his great political hero to be former Prime Minister Bonar Law.

He was described by The Guardian as one of the most "hardline right-wingers" up for election in 2001 after comments he made in 1991 about charities fighting the AIDS epidemic were reported. Field criticised AIDS campaigns as a waste of taxpayers' money and wanted mandatory tests for AIDS: "Many charitable trusts set up to help counter Aids in the mid-1980s became little more than a gay rights front", he wrote in Crossbow in 1991.

As a parliamentarian Field, however, proved a strong supporter of equal rights. Within months of his election, in October 2001, he was one of four Tory MPs supporting a 10-minute rule bill on civil partnerships, a course he continued to support until it was on the statute books. He was also one of the Conservative MPs to vote in favour of gay marriage when this became law in May 2013. He was appointed an Opposition Whip by Iain Duncan Smith in 2003, becoming the Shadow Minister for London later that year. Between May and December 2005, he was Shadow Financial Secretary to HM Treasury. For 11 months, from late 2005 to late 2006, he was the Conservative Party's spokesman on Culture, Media and Sport under the new leadership of David Cameron in 2005. During his tenure he guided Opposition policy on the National Lottery Act 2006 and promoted policy safeguarding lottery funds for its four original causes of the Arts, heritage, charities and sport. He also led opposition to Britain's public library service.

In September 2010, Field was appointed by the Prime Minister David Cameron to the Intelligence and Security Committee, chaired by former Foreign Secretary, Sir Malcolm Rifkind. He became the youngest MP on this committee, which reports directly to 10 Downing Street and oversees the UK's intelligence and security services.

He takes a special interest in economic affairs, financial services, foreign trade and international development and was chairman of the All-Party Parliamentary Group on Venture Capital & Private Equity as well as vice-chairman of the Groups on Football and Bangladesh. He previously served as chairman of the APPGs for Azerbaijan and Business Services. He has served on the Standing Committees of several pieces of legislation, including the Business Rates Supplements Act and the Finance Acts in 2008 and 2009.

As a backbencher, Field introduced several high-profile debates on issues of local and national importance such as homelessness, Northern Ireland, Government debt, Heathrow airport, policing in London, social housing, home education and population estimates. He has run local campaigns on business rates, St Bartholomew's Hospital, assisting the creative industries, the control of rickshaws in the West End, social housing rent rises, the independence of the City of London Police (including its fraud detection expertise) and, in July 2011, successfully argued in Parliament for the Department of Culture, Media and Sport's continuing control of the Royal Parks.

Field expressed criticism of the previous system governing MPs' second home allowances: The Daily Telegraph's investigation of MPs' expenses found Field to be among the lower-end claimants.

He has been a supporter of looser rules on MPs' outside earnings and was quoted in 2001 as saying: "If you're earning several hundred thousand a year in the City, are you going to give it up for £47,000 a year in the Commons?" In 2012, it was reported that the Independent Parliamentary Standards Authority (Ipsa) had plans to reform MPs' pay, which could lead to them facing salary cuts for taking on second jobs. Field, who had earned £90,000 in the previous year through advisory work, called the proposals "totally unacceptable", especially for MPs with London costs.

In October 2011, Field voiced opposition to Occupy London protestors camped in his constituency. He expressed concern that their "tent city" was turning into a "semi-permanent encampment" which was disrupting St Paul's Cathedral, a "key iconic tourist site" and place of worship. He suggested that police should clear the camp at night and later said: "While no one expects anti-capitalism to be a 24-hour activity, I would have hoped the protesters would show a little more respect for the sanctity of St Paul's." On 28 February 2012, after 137 days of occupation, Field's initial recommendation became reality following a Court order when the site was cleared by the City of London Police in just 137 minutes.

In March 2014, he launched Conservatives for Managed Migration in order to spark a "calm and rational debate about migration both within and beyond the Conservative Party" before the 2015 General Election. Field asserted that the Coalition Government's pledge to get "annual net migration down to the tens of thousands" was undeliverable, risked potential harm to the economy and could ultimately be electorally damaging to the Conservative Party. In March 2015, Field was sworn into the Privy Council, thereafter being accorded the honorific prefix of "The Right Honourable".

In July 2015, Field was appointed vice chairman (International) of the Conservative Party under the leadership of David Cameron and was reappointed to the role by Theresa May. The role involves chairing the Party's International and Outreach Office which builds relationships with international sister parties on the centre-right, works with the Westminster Foundation for Democracy to enhance democratic institutions and political party structures in the developing world, acts as a link between the Party and its MEP group through work with the Alliance of Conservatives and Reformists in Europe (ACRE), and engages in political outreach work with diaspora communities in the UK.

In 2016, he met Halbe Zijlstra, Leader of the Dutch People's Party for Freedom and Democracy in the House of Representatives, who had made a series of controversial comments about immigrants and political correctness. It was argued that Field's role as vice chairman of the Conservative Party also includes liaising with sister centre-right parties in Europe.

=== Minister for Asia and Pacific ===
On 13 June 2017, he was appointed a Minister of State at the Foreign and Commonwealth Office. At the FCO his formal responsibilities included: Asia, Australasia/Pacific, Communications (public diplomacy and scholarship), British Council, Economic Diplomacy (including international energy strategy; climate change; OECD relationship; fintech/cyber and the illegal wildlife trade), FCO Services Overseas and the Prosperity Fund (as FCO representative on the Ministerial board). His work on climate change has included representing the UK government at December 2018's COP24 UN Climate Change Conference in Katowice, Poland as well as the San Francisco Climate Summit and PIF in Nauru earlier that year. He promoted UK expertise across Asia in green finance, renewables, carbon capture utilisation and storage, and electric vehicle technology.

=== Assault allegation ===
On 20 June 2019, Greenpeace accused Field of assault, after an activist who interrupted Chancellor of the Exchequer Philip Hammond's Mansion House Speech was grabbed by the neck, pinned against a wall and then pushed out of the event by Field. Field said he reacted "instinctively" and referred himself to the Cabinet Office for an investigation. He apologised to the activist for "grabbing her" and said he was worried she might have been armed. As a result of the incident, he was suspended as a minister on 21 June, while investigations took place. The City of London Police reviewed the events and declared that it would be taking no further action. When Boris Johnson became prime minister in July 2019, Field was dropped from his ministerial role at the Foreign Office as part of a cabinet reshuffle. The Whitehall investigation was closed, as he felt that it was a "matter for the previous PM concerning his conduct during his time as a minister under her appointment". In October 2019, he announced that he would stand down from Parliament at the next general election, citing disagreement with government policy over Brexit.

A Cabinet Office investigation into the assault allegation, published in December 2019, concluded that he had breached the ministerial code but that he would not receive any sanction as Field was no longer in Parliament.

== Writer and commentator ==
His first book was titled Between the Crashes. His second book was titled The Best of Times. The books were co-authored with future MP Julia Lopez who was his chief of staff at the time.

Field has been a regular panellist on BBC Radio 4's Westminster Hour and has appeared on various other BBC television programmes, including Daily Politics, Sunday Politics and Newsnight, ITV's Late Debate (a panellist from 2009) and Sky News as a newspaper reviewer. He has made contributions to the political blog, ConservativeHome, particularly on economic matters. He has written for The Daily Telegraph and City AM, and wrote an article for The Independent about the Christian minority in Syria.

== Personal life ==
Field's first wife was former investment banker Michele Acton; they married in 1994. They divorced in 2006 following Field's extra-marital affair between 2004 and 2005 with Liz Truss, who was also married.

In 2007, Field married Victoria Elphicke, a "celebrity agent". They have two children.

== Publications ==
- Between the Crashes, (Biteback Publishing, 2013), ISBN 9781849545532
- The Best of Times: Challenges and Triumphs in British Politics, Economics and Foreign Affairs 2013-2015, (Biteback Publishing, 2016), ISBN 9781785900730
- The End of an Era: The Decline and Fall of the Tory Party (Biteback Publishing, March 2025) ISBN 9781785909757

Parliament of the United Kingdom
Preceded by Peter Brooke	Member of Parliament for the Cities of London and Westminster; 2001–2019	Succeeded by Nickie Aiken
