= Julia Cartwright Ady =

British historian and art critic

Julia Mary Cartwright Ady (7 November 1851 – 28 April 1924) was a British historian and art critic whose work focused on the Italian Renaissance.

== Early life ==
Cartwright Ady was born at Edgcote, Northamptonshire, into a respected Northamptonshire family, the daughter of Richard Aubrey Cartwright and Hon Mary Fremantle, daughter of Thomas Fremantle, 1st Baron Cottesloe. She had a liberal Anglican upbringing and was home-schooled in art, literature, languages, dance and music.

Cartwright Ady developed a fascination with art early on, particularly of the Italian Renaissance. Her cousin William Cornwallis Cartwright was an art collector and supporter of the Italian Risorgimento, and Cartwright Ady regularly visited his house at Aynhoe Park where she had her first exposure to works of the Old Masters. Her cousin's collection included paintings by Murillo, Canaletto, Spagnoletto and Albano. Cartwright Ady read widely from a young age, covering historical Italian texts, contemporary fiction and current British art publications. She greatly admired the poetry of Robert Browning and his collection Men and Women (1855) with its poems ‘Fra Filippo Lippi’ and ‘Andrea del Sarto’, which, inspired by Italian Renaissance painters, had a substantial influence on her. She was also an avid reader of John Ruskin, George Eliot and early Italian writing and poetry such as by Savonarola and Torquato Tasso.

In 1868, she toured France, Austria, and Italy with her family.

== Art criticism and publications ==
Cartwright Ady was a respected author and authority on art who wrote for leading art periodicals and published 23 books on art and history.

In 1871, Cartwright Ady contributed an article in Aunt Judy's Magazine, and also wrote for the Monthly Packet, and for a series of "The Lives of the Saints". She read works on Renaissance art, including those of Anna Jameson, John Ruskin, Charles Lock Eastlake, Walter Pater, and particularly the New History of Painting in Italy by Joseph Archer Crowe and Giovanni Battista Cavalcaselle. In 1873, Cartwright Ady submitted an article on Giotto to Macmillan's Magazine, which was turned down at the time, but appeared in the New Quarterly in 1877. Cartwright continued to write art criticism for journals such as The Portfolio and the Magazine of Art. She visited Italy at least three times in the 1870s and on one of these occasions met Rev William Henry Ady whom she persuaded to take up the post of rector at Edgcote and married in 1880.

In 1881, Cartwright Ady published her first art historical monograph, Mantegna and Francia, and later wrote books on Sandro Botticelli and Raphael.

Cartwright Ady's most celebrated books were her biographies of Isabella d'Este, the Renaissance art patron, and her younger sister, Beatrice d'Este,

Cartwright Ady highlighted the lives of women in other writings, including books on Dorothy Sidney, mistress of Edmund Waller, Henrietta, Duchess of Orléans, sister of Charles II, Baldassare Castiglione and Christina of Denmark, the art-loving Danish expatriate.

In 1901, she published The Painters of Florence from the Thirteenth to the Sixteenth Centuries and in 1914, The Italian Gardens of the Renaissance and other Studies.

Cartwright Ady also contributed to the scholarship of 19th-century art, including a book on the life of Jean-François Millet and writings on James Mallord William Turner, Edwin Landseer, James Abbot McNeil Whistler and the Pre-Raphaelites, Dante Gabriel Rossetti, and Edward Burne-Jones.

She was positive about some forms of modern art, but was shocked by the 1912 Post-Impressionist exhibition mounted by Roger Fry at the Grafton Galleries. Her art criticism was influenced by Walter Pater and the connoisseurship of Giovanni Morelli, and her friendship with the writer and art author Vernon Lee.

== Personal life ==
After her husband's death in 1915, Cartwright Ady moved to Oxford and died there in 1924. Her daughter, Cecilia Ady (1881–1958) was also a Renaissance historian.

== Publications ==
- Mantegna and Francia. London: Sampson Low & Co., 1881.
- The Pilgrims' Way from Winchester to Canterbury ... With forty-six illustrations by A. Quinton. London: J. S. Virtue & Co., 1893.
- Sacharissa; some account of Dorothy Sidney, Countess of Sunderland, her family and friends, 1617-1684. London: Seeley & Co., 1893.
- Jules Bastien-Lepage. London: Seeley and Co., Limited; New York: Macmillan and Co., 1894.
- Madame. A life of Henrietta, daughter of Charles I. and Duchess of Orleans. London: Seeley & Co., 1894.
- Sir Edward Burne-Jones, Bart. His life & work. London: J. S. Virtue & Co., 1894.
- The Early Work of Raphael. London: Seeley and Co., Limited; New York: Macmillan and Co., 1895.
- Raphael in Rome. London: Seeley and Co., Limited; New York: Macmillan and Co., 1895.
- G. F. Watts, Royal Academician. His life & work. London: J. S. Virtue & Co., 1896.
- Jean François Millet. His life and letters. London: S. Sonnenschein & Co., 1896.
- Christ & His Mother in Italian Art. Edited by J. Cartwright ... With an introduction by Robert Eyton. L.P., London: Bliss, Sands & Co., 1897.
- Beatrice d'Este, Duchess of Milan, 1475-1497. A study of the Renaissance. London: J. M. Dent & Co., 1899.
- The Painters of Florence from the thirteenth to the sixteenth century. London: John Murray, 1901.
- Isabella d'Este, Marchioness of Mantua, 1474-1539; a study of the Renaissance. London: John Murray, 1903.
- The Life and Art of Sandro Botticelli. London: Duckworth & Co., 1904.
- Raphael. London: Duckworth & Co.; New York: E. P. Dutton & co., 1905.
- Baldassare Castiglione the perfect courtier, his life and letters, 1478-1529. London: John Murray, 1908.
- Hampton Court. London: Wells Gardner & Co., 1910.
- Christina of Denmark, Duchess of Milan and Lorraine, 1522-1590. London: John Murray, 1913.
- Italian Gardens of the Renaissance, and Other Studies. London: Smith, Elder & Co., 1914.
