= St Hugh's College, Oxford =

College of the University of Oxford

St Hugh's College
- University of Oxford
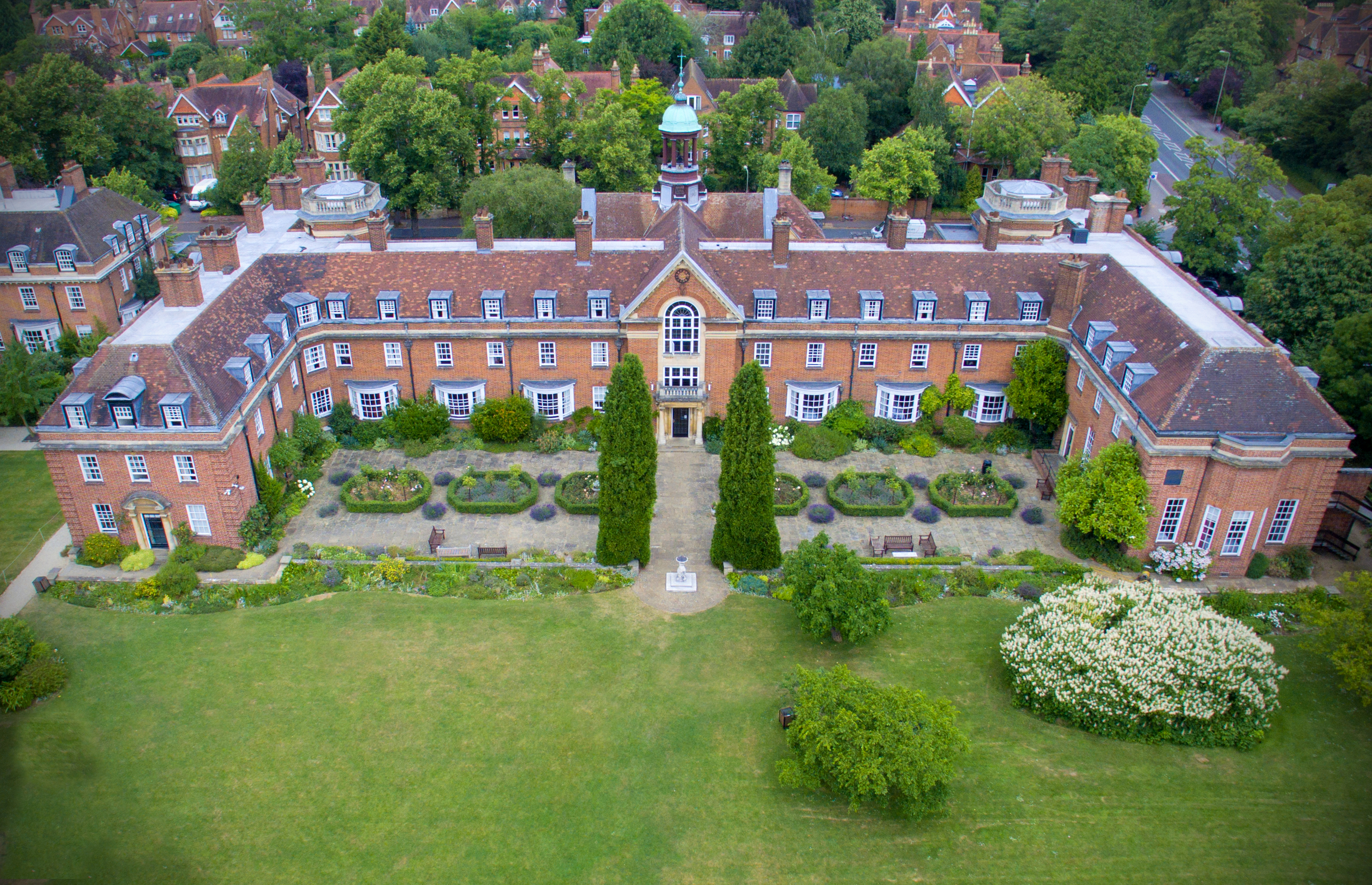

- Arms: Azure, a saltire ermine, between four fleurs-de-lys or.
- Location: St Margaret's Road, Oxford OX2 6LE
- Coordinates: 51°45′59″N 1°15′49″W
- Full name: St Hugh's College in the University of Oxford
- Latin name: Collegium Sancti Hugonis
- Established: 1886
- Named for: Saint Hugh of Lincoln
- Sister college: Clare College, Cambridge
- Principal: Michele Acton
- Undergraduates: 420 (2024–25)
- Postgraduates: 380 (2024–25)
- Endowment: £39.2 million (2023)
- Visitor: Ingrid Simler, Lady Simler
- Website: www.st-hughs.ox.ac.uk
- JCR: www.sthughsjcr.org.uk
- MCR: sthughsmcr.uk
- Boat club: St Hugh's Boat Club

Map
- Location within Oxford city centre

St Hugh's College is a constituent college of the University of Oxford. It is located on a 14.5-acre (5.9-hectare) site on St Margaret's Road, to the north of the city centre. It was founded in 1886 by Elizabeth Wordsworth as a women's college, and accepted its first male students in its centenary year in 1986. Prominent alumni include Theresa May, Aung San Suu Kyi, Amal Clooney and Heather Hallett, Baroness Hallett. It enjoys a reputation as one of the most attractive colleges because of its extensive gardens.

In its 125th anniversary year, the college became a registered charity under the name "The Principal and Fellows of St Hugh's College in the University of Oxford". As of July 2023, the college's financial endowment was £39.2 million. The college's Visitor is U.K. Supreme Court Justice Ingrid Simler, Lady Simler. In September 2025, former CEO of the Royal Society of Medicine Michele Acton became the college's Principal, succeeding Lady Elish Angiolini.

== History ==
=== Founding and early years ===
St Hugh's was founded in 1886 by Elizabeth Wordsworth (great-niece of the poet William Wordsworth) as a women's college. A large percentage of the young women who came to St Hugh's in the early years were the daughters of clergymen; most of the other fathers were professional, middle-class men. Its purpose was "to make it possible for women of modest means to live and study in Oxford...with religious teachings (Church of England) on the same lines as Lady Margaret Hall" of which Elizabeth Wordsworth had been founding principal. Using money left to her by her father Christopher Wordsworth, who had been Bishop of Lincoln, Wordsworth established the new college at 25 Norham Road in North Oxford. She named the college after one of her father's 12th-century predecessors, Hugh of Lincoln, who was canonised in 1220, and in whose diocese Oxford had been.

The college was initially accommodated in properties in Norham Road, Norham Gardens and Fyfield Road. The first principal being Charlotte Anne Moberly, its first students were Jessie Annie Emmerson, Charlotte Jourdain, Constance E. Ashburner, Wilhelmina J. de Lorna Mitchell and Grace J. Parsons. Students were required to ask the principal before accepting invitations to visit friends, and the college gates were locked at 9pm. Records show that rent was between £18 and £21 a term, depending on the size of the room, with fires being charged extra. At first tuition and lectures were arranged by the Association for the Education of Women, the first college tutor being Dora Wylie, appointed around 1898.

The college began to move to its present site in 1913, when it purchased the lease of a house called "The Mount" from the Rev Robert Hartley for £2,500. This house stood on the corner of St Margaret's Road and Banbury Road, and the freehold was owned by University College. The house was later demolished to make way for the Main Building of the college, which was constructed between 1914 and 1916 thanks to a gift from Clara Evelyn Mordan; the college's new library was named Mordan Hall in her honour. The first book was a copy of George Sale's 1734 translation of the Koran, which was given to the college by the then Bishop of Tokyo. In 1919, J. R. R. Tolkien began to tutor undergraduates at St Hugh's, given that the women's colleges were in great need of good teachers in their early years, and Tolkien as a married professor (then still not common) was considered suitable, as a bachelor don would not have been.

The college soon took over other properties nearby. The leasehold of 4 St Margaret's Road was acquired in 1919; it became the first "College house". The leasehold of 82 Woodstock Road was donated to the college by Joan Evans in 1924, and 89 Banbury Road was purchased from Lincoln College for £7,000 in 1927. The college obtained the freehold to the main site in 1927, and a year later the first stage of the Mary Gray Allen building was constructed on what had been the tennis courts. The freeholds of 1–4 St Margaret's Road and 74–82 Woodstock Road were purchased from St John's College in 1931 and 1932 respectively. The college received a royal charter in 1926.

In 1936, to mark 50 years since it was founded, a "Group Portrait" was painted of Evelyn Procter, History Tutor; Edith Wardale, English Language Tutor; Elizabeth Francis, French Tutor; Barbara Gwyer, Principal; and Cecilia Ady, History Tutor by Henry Lamb. In the same year 1 St Margaret's Road was demolished, and a new library was built in the Mary Gray Allen building; it was named the Moberly Library after the first principal of the college (the library was extensively renovated between 1999 and 2000 and renamed the Howard Piper Library after a St Hugh's alumnus, after his parents made a large donation to the college).

=== Second World War ===
At the outbreak of the Second World War the college site was requisitioned by the military for use as the Hospital for Head Injuries under the directorship of Hugh Cairns, the first Nuffield Professor of Surgery. Brick huts were constructed in the college grounds with space for 300 beds. Between 1940 and 1945, over 13,000 servicemen and women were treated at the college. Advances in medicine discovered at the hospital meant the mortality rate for brain-penetrating injuries fell from 90% to 9%. Staff and students were relocated to Holywell Manor, Savile House and St Hilda's College for the duration of the war.

In 1943 the college acquired the leasehold of 72 Woodstock Road (known as The Shrubbery) from Dame Gertrude Whitehead for £1,500. It was used as a club for American soldiers during the war. In 1946, it was leased to the University of Paris as the Maison française d'Oxford, an Anglo-French educational establishment. One of the cottages in the grounds of number 72 was later leased by Barbara Gwyer after her retirement as principal.

=== 1945 onwards ===
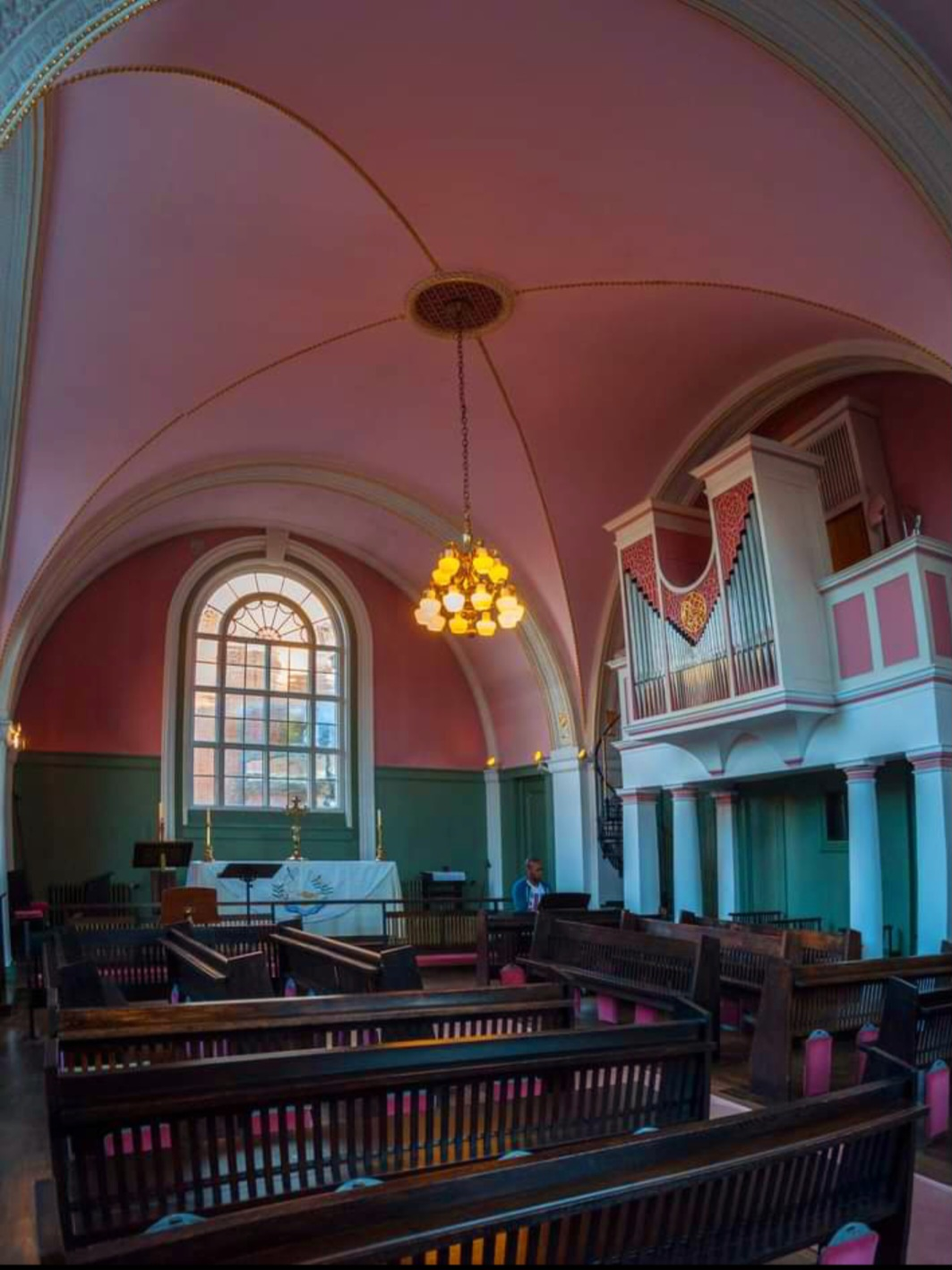
The college chapel

The college buildings were de-requisitioned in 1945. The hospital huts were initially leased as offices to university departments, including the Bureau of Animal Population, the Department of Zoological Field Studies and the Institute of Statistics, before being demolished in 1952. Agnes Headlam-Morley, a fellow of St Hugh's, became the first woman to hold a chair at the University of Oxford in 1948.

In 1951 the college purchased the freeholds to 85 and 87 Banbury Road and 9 to 13 Canterbury Road from St John's College. In addition, the freehold of The Shrubbery was acquired; this meant the college now owned the freehold of the entire 14 1/2-acre site. The college extended the Main Building in 1958.

The 1960s saw an extensive programme of building work at St Hugh's. The Shrubbery was converted into the principal's lodgings in 1963. Between 1964 and 1965 the Kenyon Building was constructed to provide accommodation for students (designed by modern architect David Roberts, the building has already been given a heritage listing). This was followed shortly after by the Wolfson Building, which was constructed between 1966 and 1967 and opened by Princess Alexandra and Harold Macmillan in his role as chancellor of the university.

The chapel was renovated in 1980; a new organ was installed. The following year, 78, 80 and 82 Woodstock Road were also renovated. The houses are now named SH Ho House, Ho Tim House and KK Leung House in recognition of the gifts from the three Hong Kong benefactors that funded the renovations.

=== Arrival of co-education ===
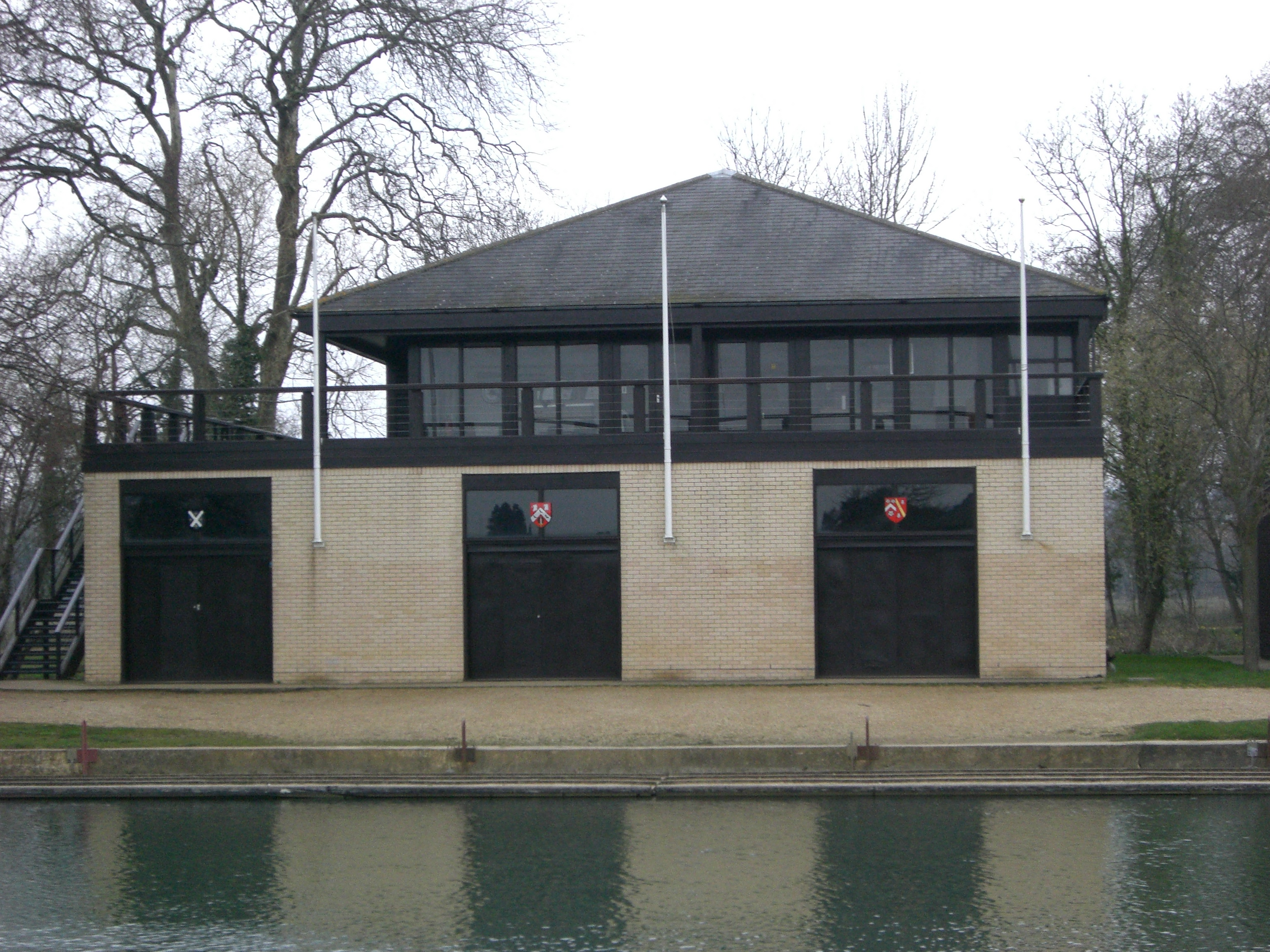
St Hugh's boathouse (far left)

In 1964, New College made a proposal for the admission of women to the men's colleges, and by the early 1970s several Oxford colleges had become mixed to a limited degree in this way. In 1979, two women's colleges, Lady Margaret Hall and St Anne's, reciprocated by admitting men as undergraduates, while St Hugh's, which was already employing male college lecturers, decided to admit men as Fellows. Resistance to full co-education was led by those who predicted that it would have severely negative effects on women academics and who saw other advantages in women's colleges. Admitting men as undergraduates was first proposed to the governing body in 1980, and there was a majority for it, but it did not secure the required two-thirds majority. The college principal, Rachel Trickett, fought off full co-education at St Hugh's for some years, even taking her case to the national newspapers, and it was not finally agreed until 1986. When Trickett retired in 1991, she was succeeded by the first male Principal, Derek Wood.

A new boathouse was constructed for the St Hugh's Boat Club (jointly with St Anne's and Wadham Colleges) between 1989 and 1990. This was followed by the construction of the Rachel Trickett Building between 1991 and 1992 at a cost of £3.4 million.

=== Present day ===
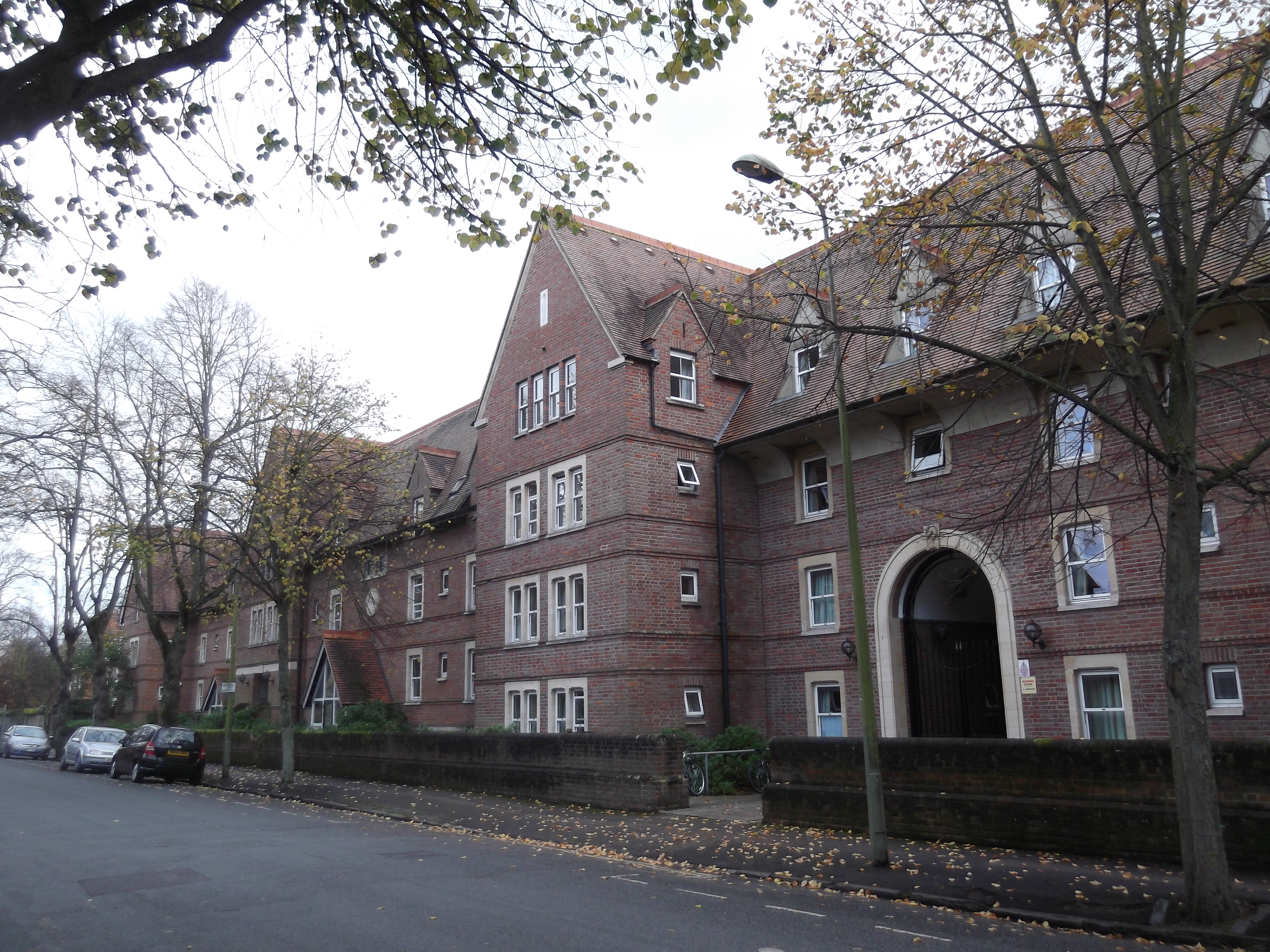
North side from St Margaret's Road

Between 1998 and 2000 the Maplethorpe Building was constructed; the building contains conference facilities on the ground floor and student accommodation on the upper three floors. The building missed its planned opening date of summer 2000, meaning students had to be accommodated in B&Bs throughout Michaelmas term. In addition, a new main entrance was constructed at the back of the college on Canterbury Road.

Between 1999 and 2000 the library was extensively renovated. It was reopened by Betty Boothroyd and was renamed after Howard Piper, a Maths student of the college who, shortly after graduating, died in a rafting accident. Mordan Hall, an older library, underwent a major refurbishment, reopening in 2007.

There are statues of both St Hugh and Elizabeth Wordsworth on the library stairs. These were presented to the college as gifts for its Jubilee in 1936. St Hugh carries a model of Lincoln Cathedral, which would have been very familiar to Elizabeth Wordsworth, and has his other hand resting on the head of a swan, the famous swan of Stow. Elizabeth Wordsworth is depicted wearing her doctoral robes.

St Hugh's College celebrated its 125th anniversary in 2011; a summer garden party was attended by over 1,200 guests. Aung San Suu Kyi sent a message to the college, saying "Happy moments are one of the pillars that keep the spirit uplifted during hard times. St Hugh’s and Oxford are inextricable from my happiest memories, those that I could draw on when the beauty of the world seemed dim. I so wish I could be with you at this very moment to relive old joys and to stir up new ones for the future. I would like to thank all my friends for the happiness we shared. To the present students of St Hugh’s I would simply like to say: Make the most of your time in this wonderful place."

In 2012 the college was sued for allegedly discriminating against the poor by requiring evidence of funds for living costs. St Hugh's, which filed defence papers to the court, accepted barring the student on financial grounds, but claimed the measure was necessary to ensure students can complete their studies. The college eventually settled the claim, with the university promising to conduct a review of the Financial Guarantee policy. In September 2013, it was revealed that the university had decided to abolish the Financial Guarantee policy and replace it with a less restrictive 'Financial Declaration'.

=== Recent development ===
In 2008, the college began a fundraising drive for a new building on the college site. In November 2010, it was confirmed that Hong Kong businessman Dickson Poon had made a £10 million donation to the college for the construction of the Dickson Poon China Centre. The centre houses the university's China Studies department, as well as providing accommodation for St Hugh's postgraduate students and The Wordsworth Tea Room. The Dickson Poon building was opened by Prince William in September 2014.

== Buildings and location ==
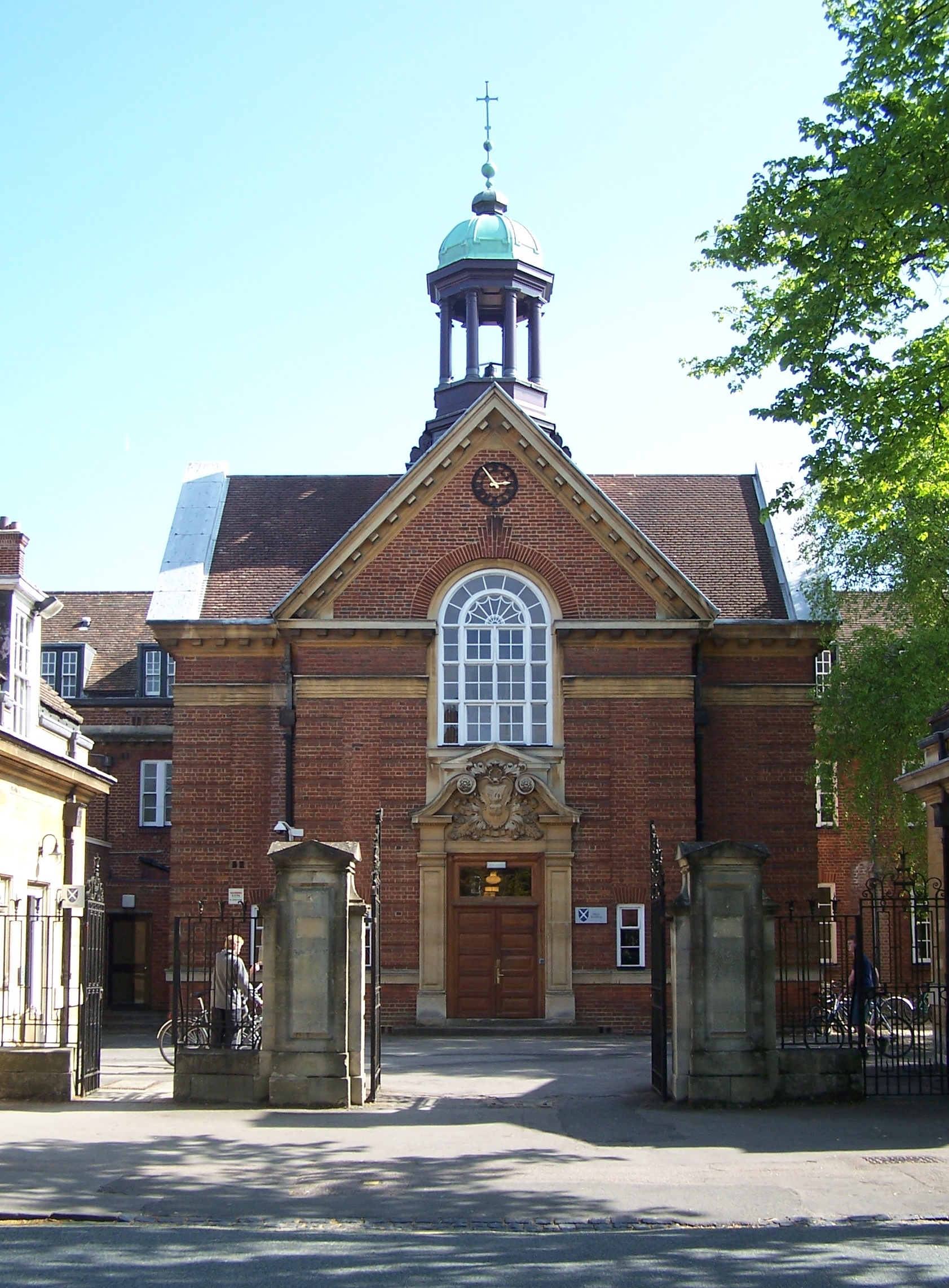
The front entrance of the college

St Hugh's occupies a rectangular site in North Oxford. It is bordered by Banbury Road to the east, Woodstock Road to the west, St Margaret's Road to the north (the front entrance) and Canterbury Road to the south (the back gate). The gardens of the college cover about ten and a half acres.

The main entrance of the college leads straight into the Main Building, containing accommodation, teaching facilities, the chapel, and the dining hall. As of 2022, the majority of first year students are housed in the Main Building, in addition to the Kenyon Building (named for Kathleen Kenyon). Some first years are housed in the Maplethorpe and Mary Gray Allen Buildings, although the majority within these buildings are second years and finalists. The Rachel Trickett Building (named for a past principal) and 82 Woodstock Road are further used as second and third year accommodation, whilst the Wolfson Building is almost exclusively used for second years. Further finalist accommodation is provided for in houses on Banbury Road. All undergraduate rooms have kitchen access, with the majority sharing bathroom access (barring Maplethorpe and the Rachel Trickett Building, which have en-suite access).

In 2018 the college adopted two cats – Admiral Flapjack and Professor Biscuit. Due to the installation of cat-flaps in 2019, the cats have free roam of the majority of buildings.

== Finances ==
In its 125th anniversary year, the college became a registered charity under the name 'The Principal and Fellows of St Hugh's College in the University of Oxford'. As of July 2018, the college's financial endowment was £37.6 million. By comparison, St John's college had a financial endowment of £551.5 million.

== Student life ==
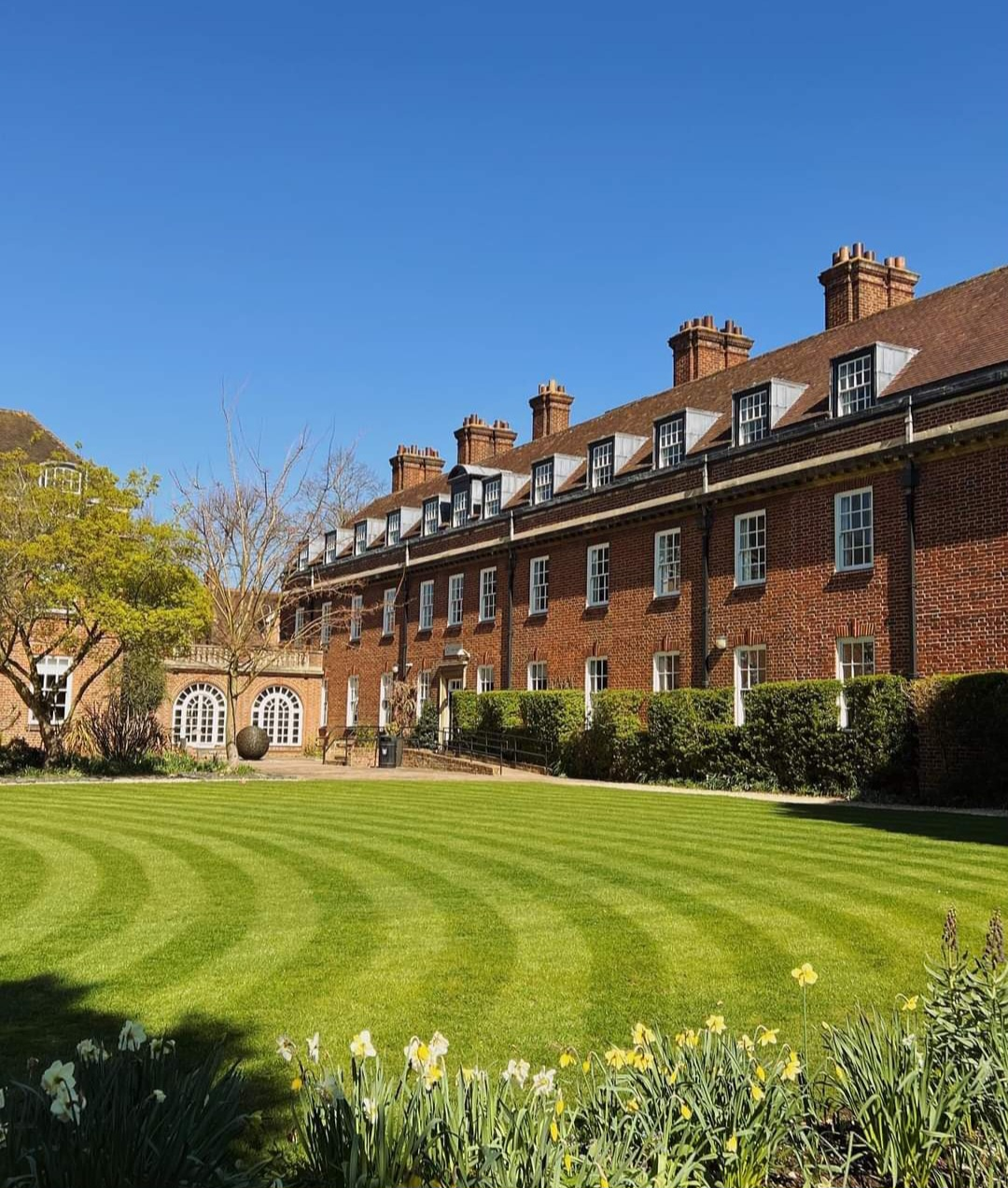
The college croquet lawn

The college is big enough to accommodate all its undergraduates for the duration of their studies. There are three large lawns for the use of students all year round. The gardens are also the venue for croquet. There are a wide range of clubs and societies – sporting, academic, and those supporting niche interests, such as horticulture.

The college has Formal Hall—a formal three or four course dinner—once a week. Students wait for Senior Members to come into High Table and Grace is said in Latin by the presiding fellow, usually the Principal, immediately prior to the meal:

Benedic nobis, Domine Deus, et his donis, quae ex liberalitate Tua sumpturi sumus, per Jesum Christum Dominum nostrum. Amen.

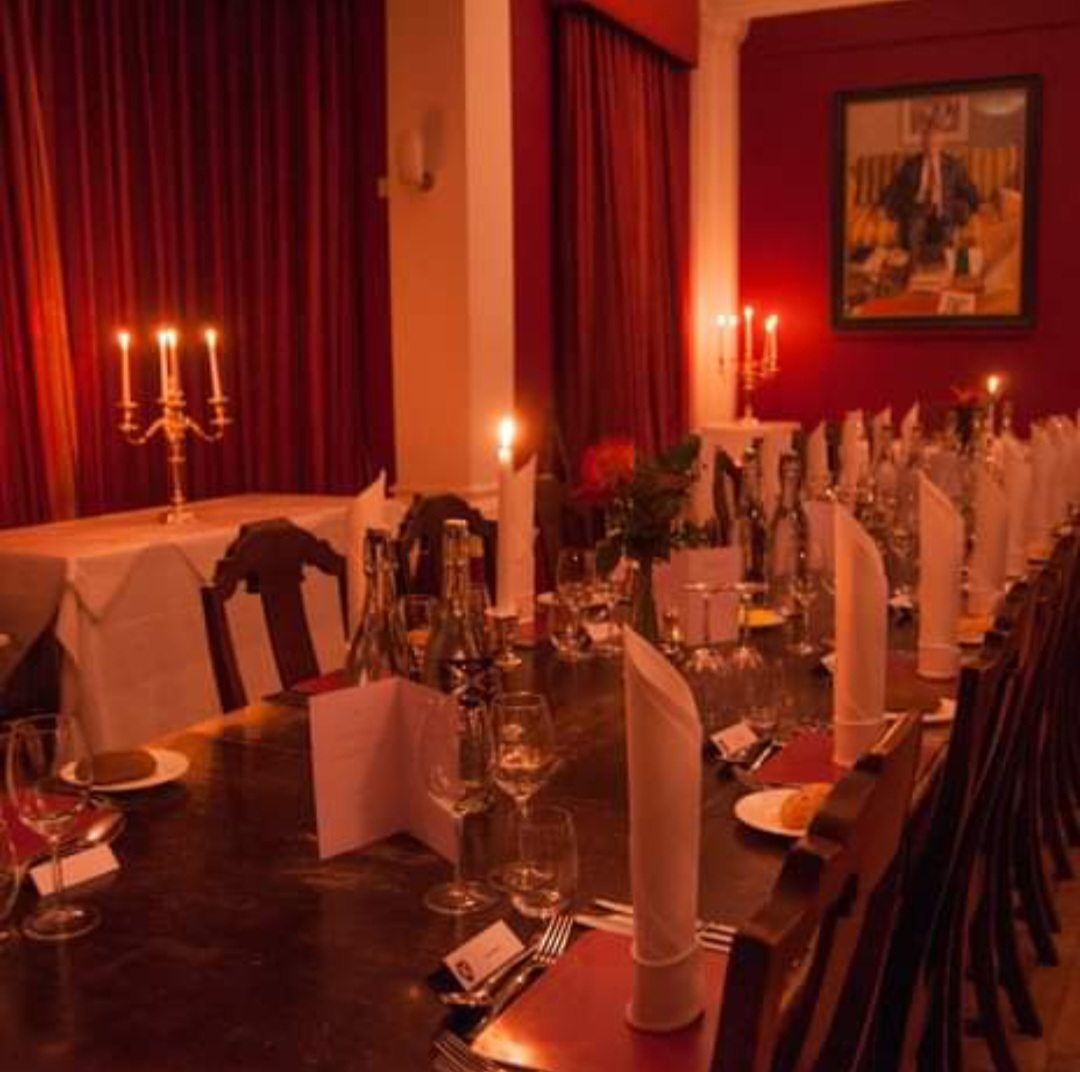
High Table in Dining Hall set for Formal Hall

=== Junior Common Room ===
As is the practice at all Oxford Colleges that offer undergraduate degrees, the undergraduate body is represented by a committee, known as the JCR Committee. Otherwise, 'JCR' refers to the physical common room in the college. The JCR was previously known as the Aung San Suu Kyi Junior Common Room, but in 2017 the student body voted to remove her name from the room's title.

The Swan is a weekly student-managed newspaper.

=== Middle Common Room ===
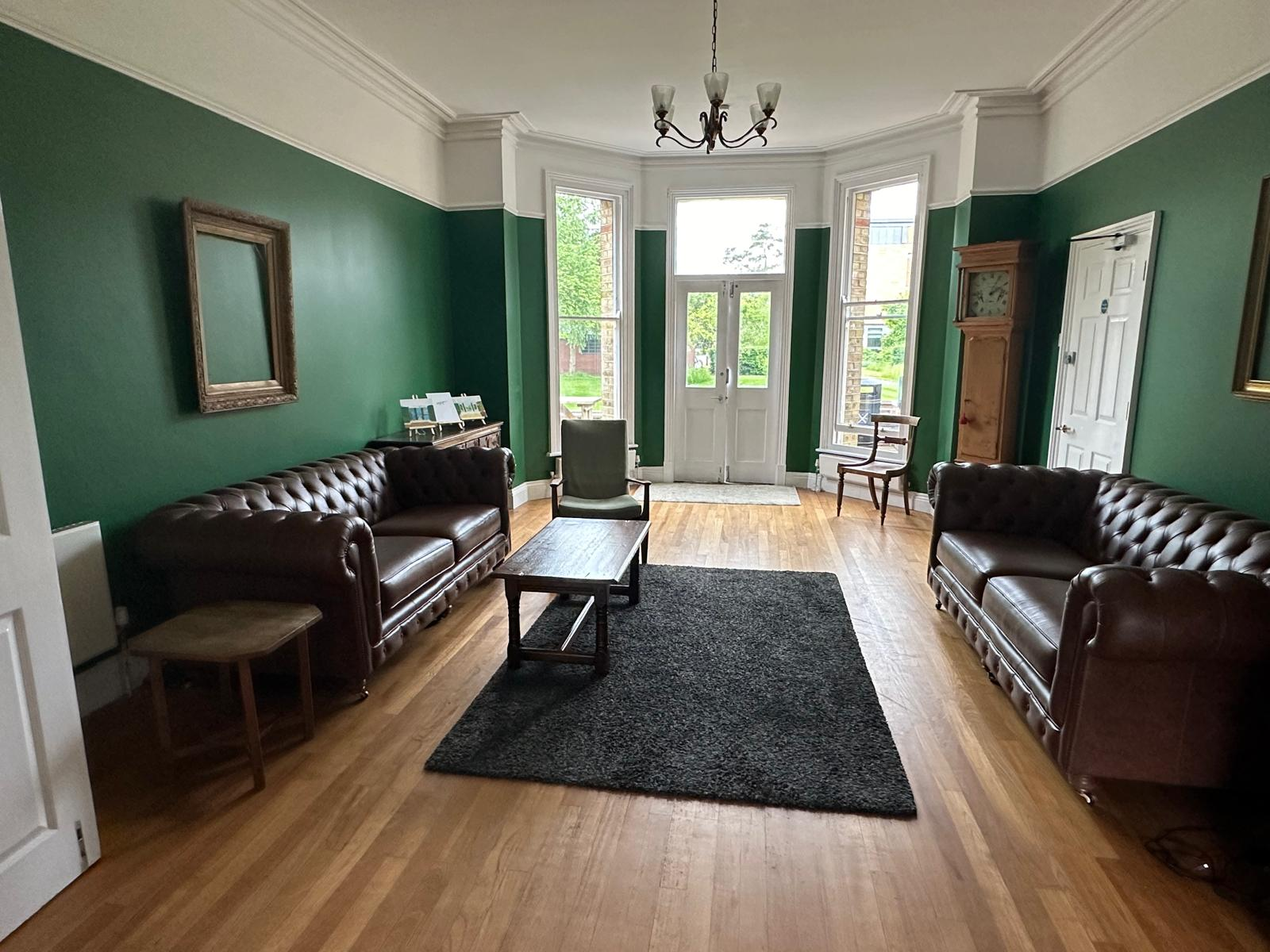
St Hugh's MCR

The college's Middle Common Room (MCR) is located at 87 Banbury Road.

=== Choir ===
St Hugh's has a choir which sings weekly evensong on Sundays. The choir draws its members from all three common rooms.

The present organ was constructed by the Italian organ-builder Tamburini in 1980. The college offers organ scholarships along with four choral exhibitions each year, and employs a professional organist to oversee the chapel music.

=== St Hugh's College Boat Club ===
St Hugh's Boat Club (SHBC) is the college rowing club. It is based on the Isis at Boathouse Island, Christ Church Meadow, Oxford. The boat club blazer is blue with white and yellow trim on the cuffs and lapels.

The establishment of the Boat Club occurred a few years after the college was founded, with 1891 being the first record of a boat being owned by the club. The boat was stored at the River Cherwell and only students "who can swim 50 feet" were permitted to use it. Almost 20 years later, the boat club was able to buy and acquire its first boathouse - the Middle Cherwell Boat House.

After a period of financial trouble, the Boat club was refounded in 1973. The newly rejuvenated club boasted 16 members coached by the members of the Brasenose College Boat Club with regular outings scheduled and a growing squad of Blues rowers. Two years later, in 1975, the St Hugh's Women's First VIII bumped Magdalen M4. and became the first and only women's boat to successfully bump a men's crew. This event was the catalyst for the creation of the Women's divisions for Summer Eight's since 1976, where St Hugh's was a strong contender. In 1979, St Hugh's W1 won the Boat Club's first Headship.

After two years of slipping down the order, the Boat Club was able to win Headship back again in 1982 until 1984. The Boat Club was also able to win Torpids Headship in the Women's division in 1986.

== People associated with St Hugh's ==
=== Principals ===
Years	Principal
1886–1915	Charlotte Anne Moberly
1915–1924	Eleanor Jourdain
1924–1946	Barbara Gwyer
1946–1962	Evelyn Procter
1962–1973	Kathleen Kenyon
1973–1991	Rachel Trickett
1991–2002	Derek Wood
2002–2012	Andrew Dilnot
2012–2025	Lady Elish Angiolini
2025–present	Michele Acton

=== Notable alumni ===
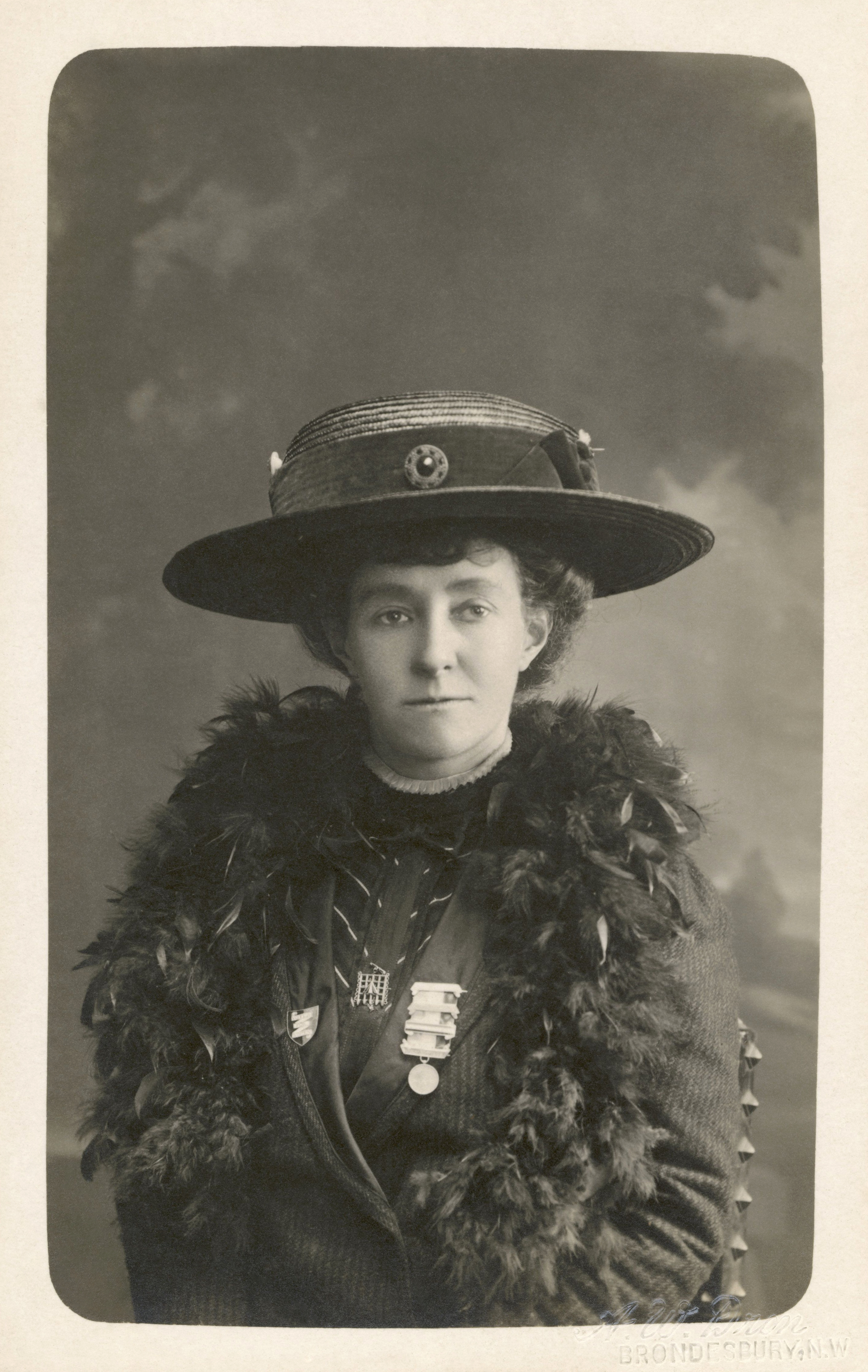
Emily Davison, suffragette

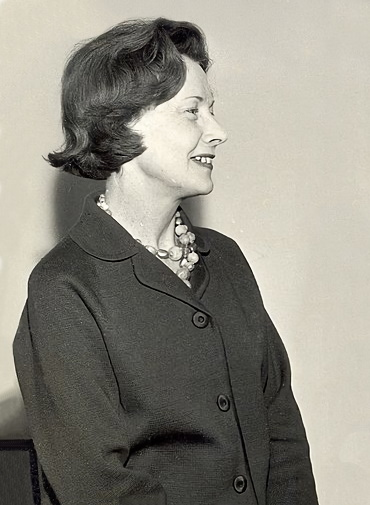
Barbara Castle, former Health Secretary

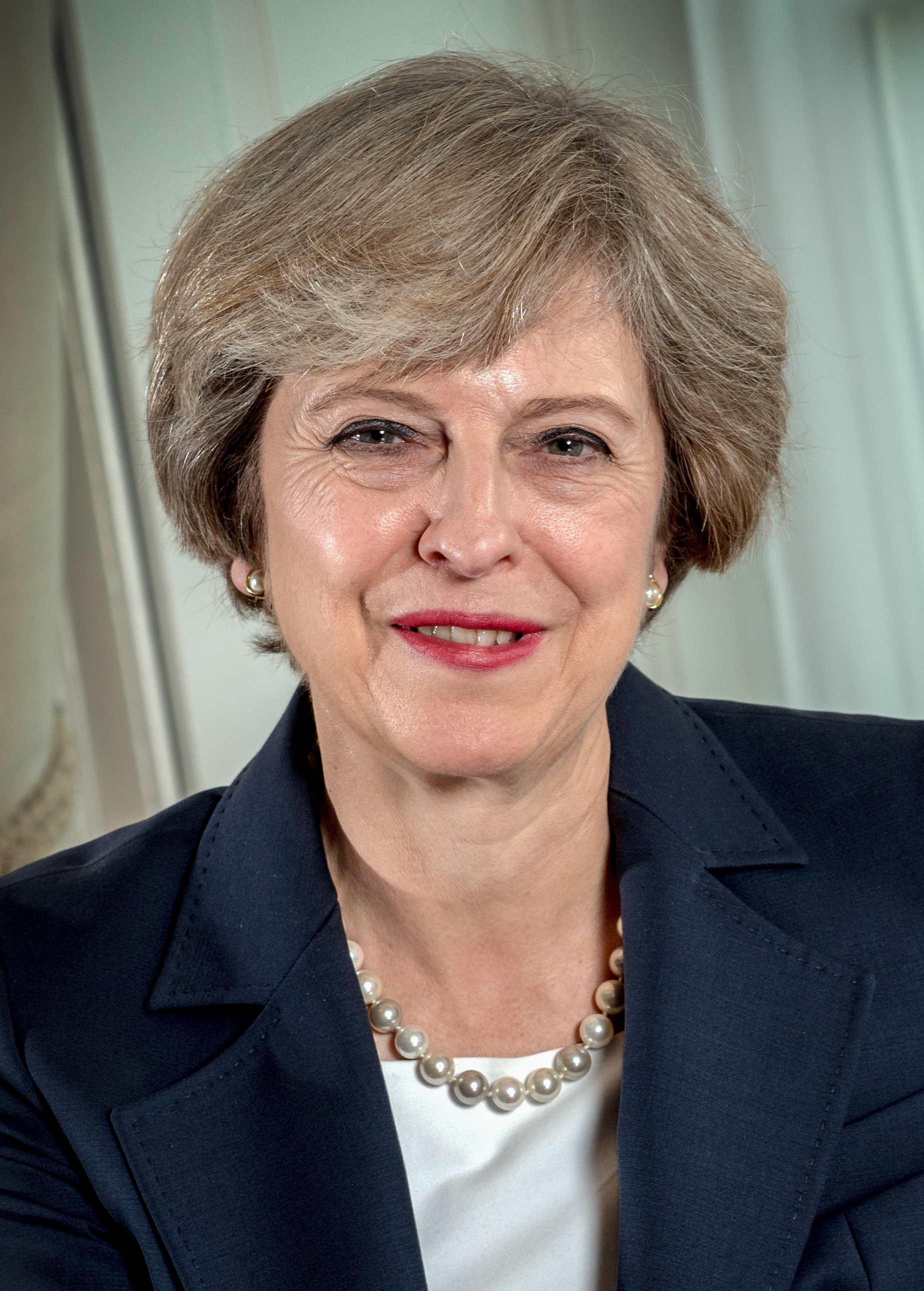
Theresa May, former British Prime Minister

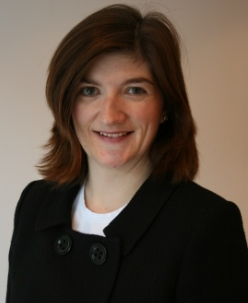
Nicky Morgan, former Education Secretary

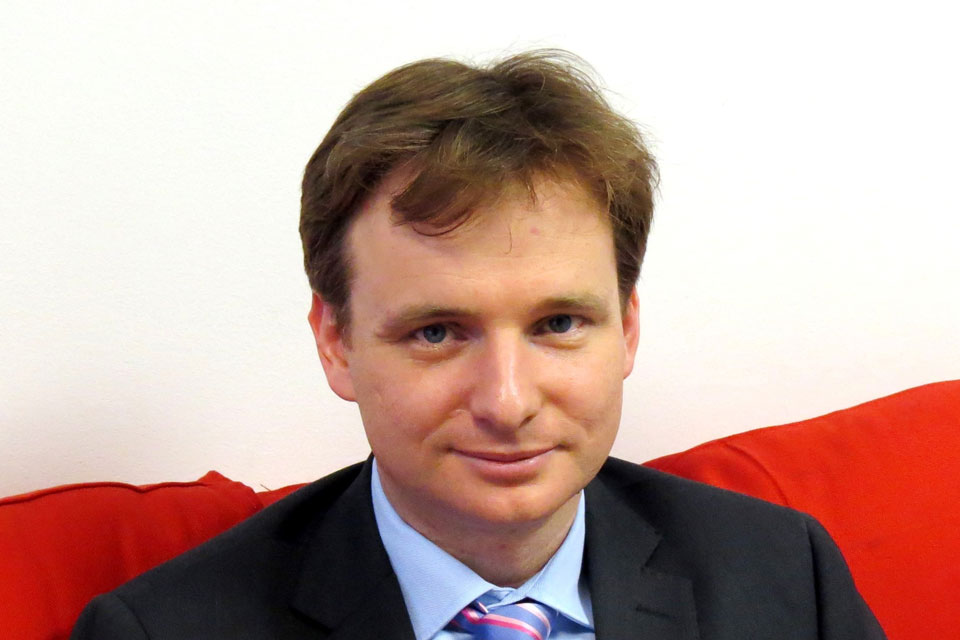
Lindsay Croisdale-Appleby, UK Ambassador to the EU

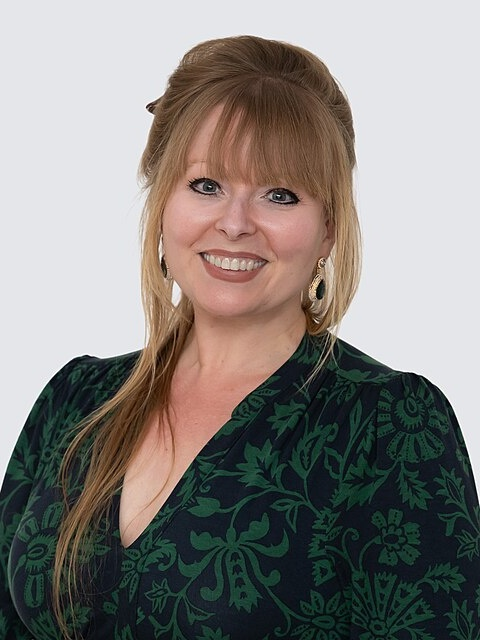
Delyth Jewell, Welsh Deputy Minister

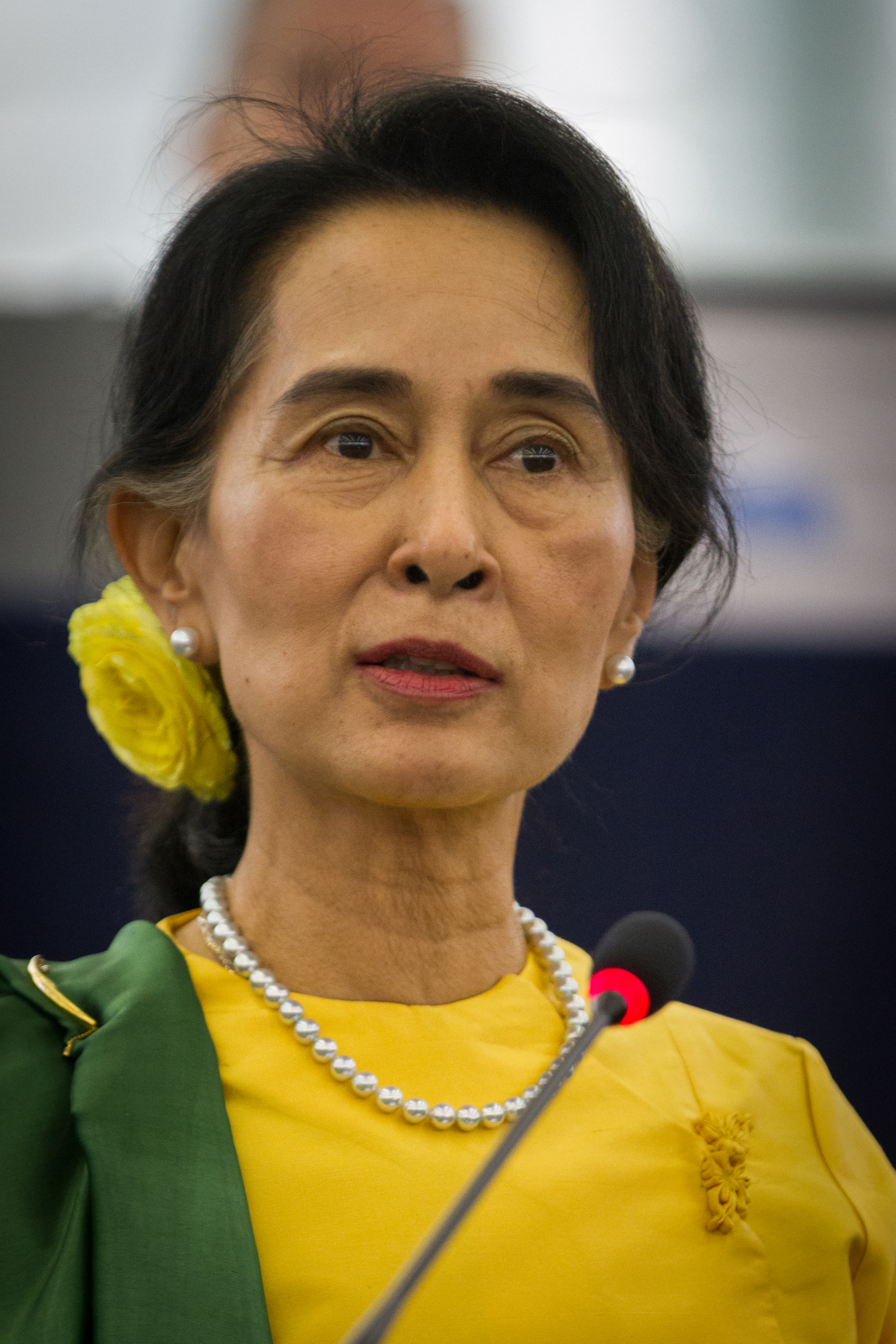
Aung San Suu Kyi, State Counsellor of Myanmar

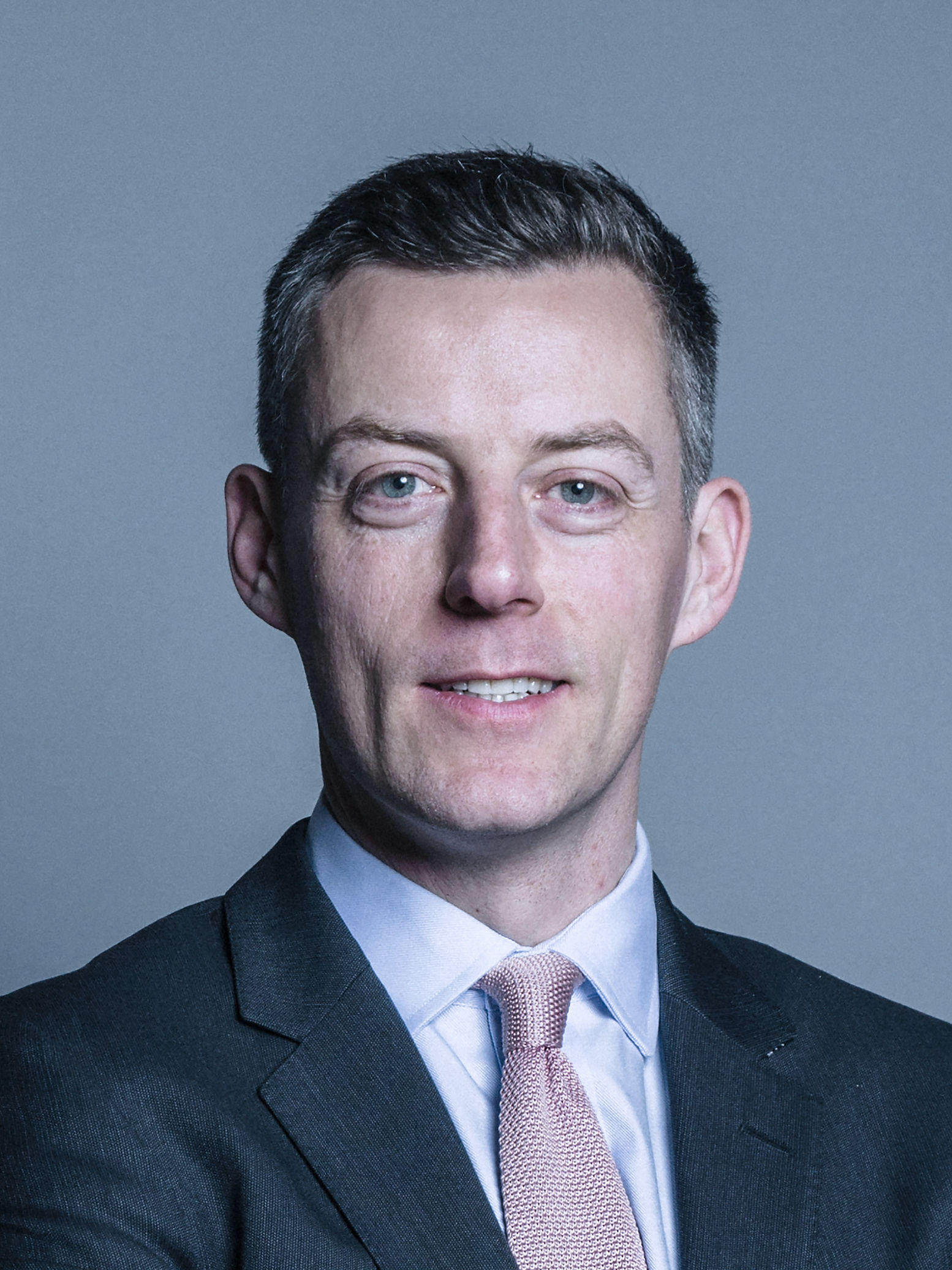
James O'Shaughnessy, Baron O'Shaughnessy, Member of the House of Lords

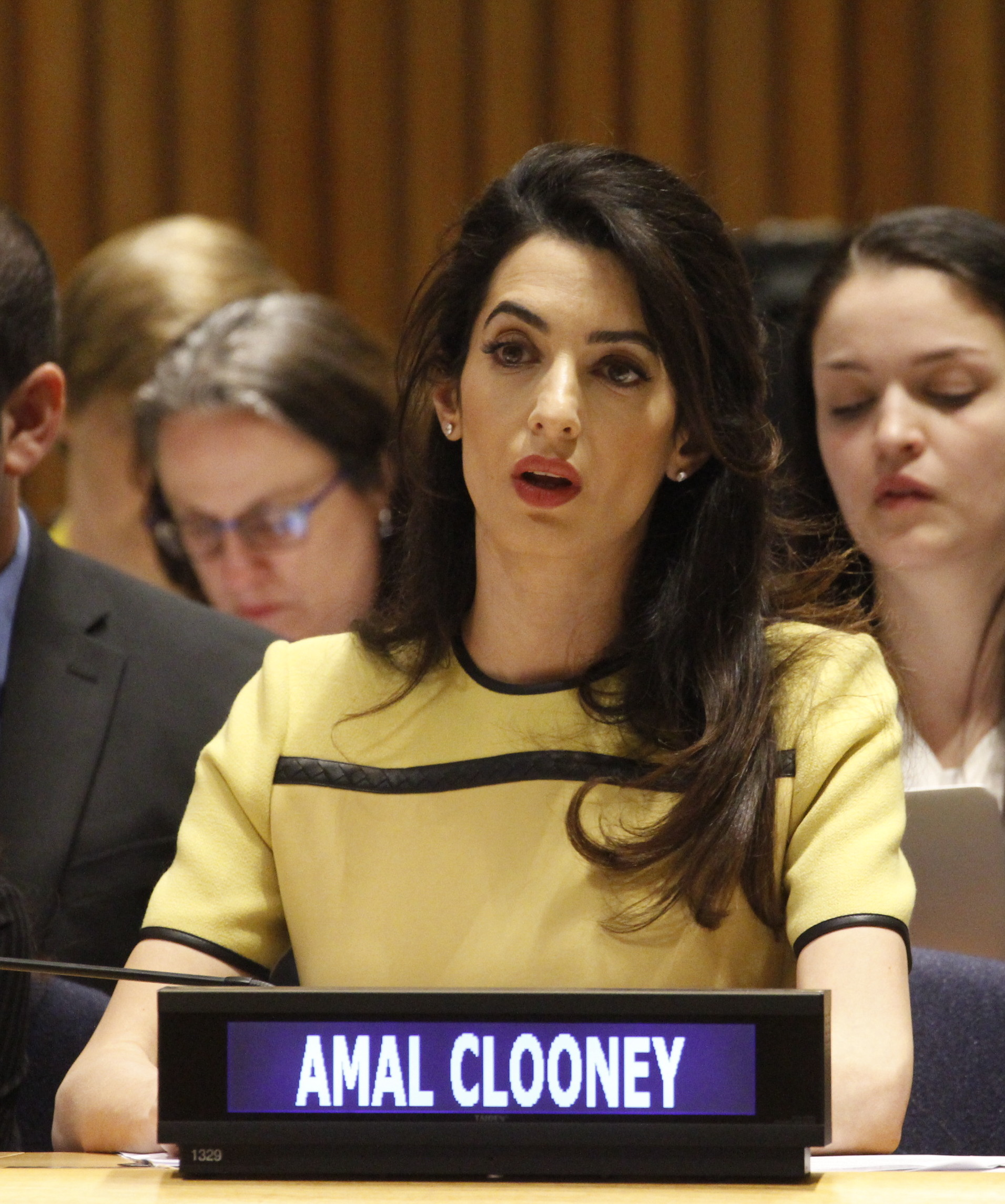
Amal Clooney, Human Rights Barrister

In politics, Theresa May, former Prime Minister of the United Kingdom; Nicky Morgan, former Secretary of State for Education; Rachel Maclean, former UK Housing Minister; Barbara Castle, former Secretary of State; Delyth Jewell, Welsh Deputy Minister; Khairy Jamaluddin, Malaysian Government Minister; and Aung San Suu Kyi, the Nobel Peace Prize laureate and State Counsellor of Myanmar.

Members of the House of Lords include James O'Shaughnessy, Baron O'Shaughnessy, Olivia Bloomfield, Baroness Bloomfield of Hinton Waldrist, and Jo Valentine, Baroness Valentine.

British diplomat Lindsay Croisdale-Appleby, ambassador to the European Union and former ambassador to Colombia, was educated at Eton College and St Hugh's. Suffragette Emily Davison enrolled at St Hugh's for one term to sit her finals.

In sport, American Olympic rower Anders Weiss competed for Oxford University in the 2018 Boat Race. Oskar Zorrilla coxed Oxford to victory in The Boat Race 2013. In The Boat Race 1982, graduate student Boris Rankov won a record number of boat races competing as a rower which was recognised by Guinness World Records and which led to the 'Rankov Rule'.

Notable alumni in business include Louise Patten, Philip J. K. James and Nate Morris.

In the arts, the musician Joe Goddard (from electropop outfit Hot Chip) studied at St Hugh's. Conductors Jane Glover and Alice Farnham read music at St Hugh's, as did BBC arts broadcaster and writer Suzy Klein. TV writer Richard Hurst wrote his first play at St Hugh's. BAFTA Award-winning actress and comedian Rebecca Front began her career at the college, touring with the Oxford Revue in 1984. Writers Mary Renault, Lady Selina Hastings, Jane Ridley and Juliet Nicolson studied at St Hugh's, as did Eileen Blair.

In science and academia, mathematical child prodigy Ruth Lawrence joined the college in 1983 aged 12. Dorothy Bishop, a psychologist specialising in developmental disorders, studied at St Hugh's. Other academics include sociologist and intelligence researcher Noah Carl; philosopher Gertrude Elizabeth Margaret Anscombe; linguist and revivalist Ghil'ad Zuckermann; Vina Mazumdar, women's studies academic; and mathematician Mary Cartwright. Another mathematician, Jillian Beardwood, known for her work on the travelling salesman problem, graduated from St Hugh's with first-class honours in 1956. Polar expedition leader Alex Hibbert read biological sciences at St Hugh's.

In law, Court of Appeal judge and chair of the UK Covid-19 Inquiry Heather Hallett, Baroness Hallett is a St Hugh's graduate. Other High Court Judges include Dame Jennifer Eady and Dame Florence Baron in London, the Honourable Madam Justice Maggie Poon in Hong Kong and Crown Court Recorder and former Oxford Union President Oliver Campbell. Human rights barrister Amal Clooney graduated with a BA in Jurisprudence from St Hugh's.

== More readings ==
- Schwartz, Laura (2011). A Serious Endeavour: Gender, Education and Community at St Hugh's, 1886-2011. Profile Books. ISBN 978-1-84765-780-0.
