= Derek Wood (barrister) =

British barrister (born 1937)

Derek Wood CBE KC

Principal of St Hugh's College, Oxford
- In office 1991–2002
- Preceded by: Rachel Trickett
- Succeeded by: Sir Andrew Dilnot

Personal details
- Education: University College, Oxford

Derek Alexander Wood, CBE, KC (born 14 October 1937) is a British barrister specialising in property law and former Deputy High Court Judge.

He was educated at University College, Oxford where he earned an MA degree in Literae Humaniores and the Bachelor of Civil Law degree. He was called to the Bar in 1964 and took Silk in 1978. Wood served as Principal of St Hugh's College, Oxford, from 1991 to 2002.

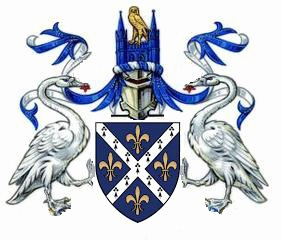
Coat of Arms of St Hugh's College where Wood served as Principal

He was Treasurer of the Middle Temple in 2006. Wood was a Recorder of the Crown Court from 1985 to 2002. He is an Honorary Fellow of University College, Oxford.

Academic offices
Preceded by Rachel Trickett	Principal of St Hugh's College, Oxford; 1991 to 2002	Succeeded by Andrew Dilnot
