= Barbara Gwyer =

British college principal

Principal of St Hugh's College, Oxford
- In office 1924–1946
- Preceded by: Eleanor Jourdain
- Succeeded by: Evelyn Procter

Personal details
- Born: Barbara Elizabeth Gwyer; 1 January 1881 Marylebone, London, England
- Died: 16 February 1974 (aged 93) Stokenchurch, Buckinghamshire, England
- Education: Lady Margaret Hall, Oxford

Barbara Elizabeth Gwyer (1 January 1881 – 16 February 1974) was an English academic administrator. She was principal of St Hugh's College, Oxford, from 1924 to 1946.

== Early life and education ==
Gwyer was born on 1 January 1881 in Marylebone, London, England. Her parents were John Edward Gwyer and Edith Gwyer (née Linford), and she had a brother, Sir Maurice Gwyer. She was educated at the Grove School, an all-girls school in Highgate, Middlesex. In 1900, she went to Lady Margaret Hall, Oxford to study classics. She achieved a second class in Mods in 1902, and a second class in Literae Humaniores in 1904. However, she could not graduate as at the time the University of Oxford only gave degrees to men. In 1920, when the statutes were changed, she graduated with a Bachelor of Arts (BA) degree and the Oxford MA.

== Career ==
Having completed her degree in 1904, Gwyer worked as a secretary for two years. From 1906 to 1908, she was an educational organiser for the West Riding County Council's educational department.

Gwyer then moved into overseeing female students at university, an area where she would spend the rest of her career. From 1910 to 1916, she was Vice-Warden of Ashburne Hall, a hall of residence for women at the Victoria University of Manchester. From 1917 to 1924, she was Warden of University Hall, Leeds. From 1924 to 1946, she served as principal of St Hugh's College, Oxford. She was the first principal of a women's college to be already a member of Convocation when she took office, owing to her own education at the University of Oxford. During her career as principal she oversaw the incorporation and drawing up of new statutes at St Hugh's, a process undertaken by the Oxford women's colleges in the 1920s in response to the Royal Commission of 1919.

== Later life ==
Following her retirement in 1946, Gwyer was made an honorary fellow of St Hugh's College, Oxford. She lived for the rest of her life in Stokenchurch, High Wycombe, Buckinghamshire, but was a regular visitor to St Hugh's. In old age, she became frail and used a wheelchair: she was described by Barbara Castle, who had studied at St Hugh's, as "a frail, gentle figure in a wheelchair—aeons away from the ogre I had known when she was principal". She died on 16 February 1974, aged 93.
