= Tim Tacchi =

British hedge fund manager

Timothy Alexander Tacchi (born 1955) is the founder of the hedge fund TT International. Before establishing TT International in 1988, Tacchi was an Investment Director with Fidelity International.

Tacchi is the owner of the Testbourne Estate, Longparish in Hampshire, England. In 2016, he was in dispute with neighbours over their plans to extend their home.
