= List of principals of Somerville College, Oxford =

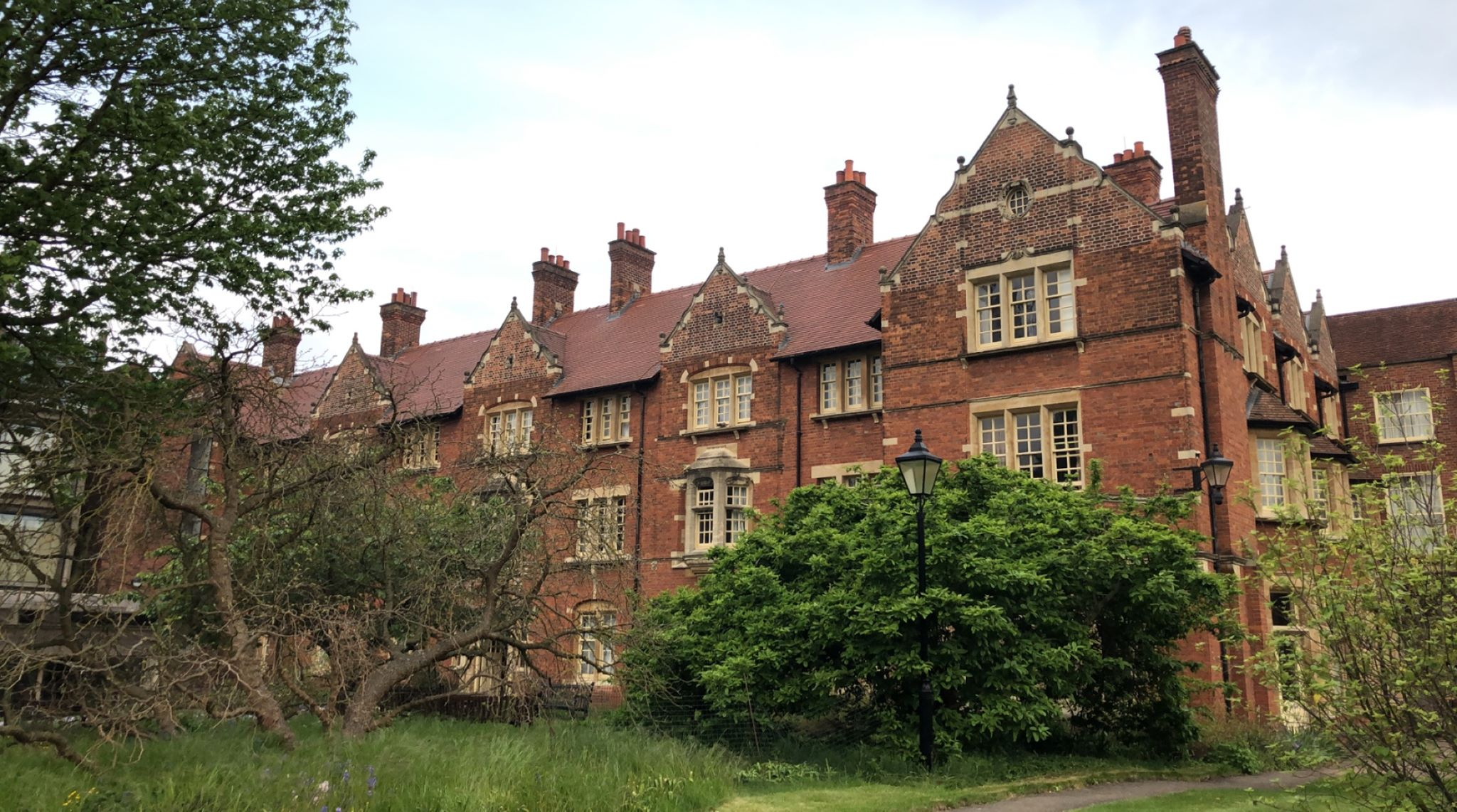
Park is one of a number of buildings at the college named in honour of former principals.

Somerville College is one of the constituent colleges of the University of Oxford. It was founded in 1879 as Somerville Hall, one of the university's first two women's colleges. Male students were admitted for the first time in 1994. The head of the college is the principal. Chosen by the college's governing body, the principal is charged with "general supervision over the conduct, administration, and educational work of the college". Somerville is the only Oxford college to have had exclusively female principals; St Hilda's, the last college other than Somerville to have been headed only by women, appointed its first male principal in 2014.

The first principal of Somerville Hall was Madeleine Shaw Lefevre, who was appointed on 3 May 1879. She was not an academic, but was well known for her social work. When approached by the chairman of the hall's council, John Percival, she was hesitant to accept the post and initially only agreed to take the role for one year, but ultimately remained in post until 1889. The first female tutor at the hall was appointed in 1882, and in 1884 women were permitted to sit university examinations for the first time. Upon Shaw Lefevre's retirement, she was succeeded by Agnes Catherine Maitland, under whom Somerville was the first of the five women's halls which now formed part of the university to formally adopt the title of college. The college's library opened for the first time during Maitland's tenure. During the tenure of the college's third principal, Emily Penrose, the requirement that female students be chaperoned while in the presence of male students was abolished, but male visitors to Somerville remained subject to a curfew. In 1927, Margery Fry, who had been appointed principal the previous year, spoke out publicly against the introduction of a limit on the numbers of students which the women's colleges could admit, but without success.

During Helen Darbishire's tenure as principal between 1931 and 1945, new additions were made to the college's buildings, including the east quadrangle which would later be named in her honour and the college chapel. In 1991, Catherine Pestell became the first principal to choose to get married while in office; as the statute of the college at the time did not permit the principal to marry, she resigned, married, and was re-elected as principal as Catherine Hughes. She was also the principal when the college opted to admit male students for the first time, a decision which proved controversial and to which many existing students were opposed, although the college's former principal Janet Vaughan told the press "I think the time had come for it. I am not sorry at all. I think it's very exciting actually." The current principal of Somerville is Catherine Royle, who took up the appointment in October 2025, succeeding Janet Royall, Baroness Royall of Blaisdon. Many former principals are commemorated in the names of buildings on the college site; the college's newest accommodation building, the Catherine Hughes Building, was opened in 2019, joining buildings named in honour of Maitland, Vaughan, Darbishire, Fry, Penrose, Barbara Craig, and Daphne Park. The longest-serving principal to date is Vaughan, who held the post from 1945 until 1967. The shortest-serving is Fry, who occupied the position from 1926 until 1931. The college's current statute states that the principal is normally appointed for a fixed term of seven years.

== List of principals ==
Key
| ‡ | Studied at Somerville College |

List of principals
| Image | Name | Birth | Death | Principal between | Notes | Ref(s). |
|---|---|---|---|---|---|---|
| | Madeleine Shaw Lefevre | 1835 | 1914 | 1879–1889 | First principal of Somerville Hall; formerly a social campaigner involved with the Workhouse Visiting Society and Metropolitan Association for Befriending Young Servants | |
| | Agnes Catherine Maitland | 1850 | 1906 | 1889–1906 | Second principal of Somerville Hall, and first principal of Somerville College, from 1894; formerly a writer and educator in domestic science | |
| | Emily Penrose ‡ | 1858 | 1942 | 1907–1926 | Classical scholar and archaeologist; formerly principal of Royal Holloway College (1898–1907); appointed Dame Commander of the Order of the British Empire (DBE) in 1927 | |
| | Margery Fry ‡ | 1874 | 1958 | 1926–1931 | Social reformer; formerly one of the UK's first female magistrates and Director of the Howard League for Penal Reform | |
| — | Helen Darbishire ‡ | 1881 | 1961 | 1931–1945 | Literary scholar, authority on the works of William Wordsworth and John Milton; academic at Somerville from 1908 until 1945 | |
| | Janet Vaughan ‡ | 1899 | 1993 | 1945–1967 | Haematologist and radiobiologist; appointed Dame Commander of the Order of the British Empire (DBE) in 1957 | |
| — | Barbara Craig ‡ | 1916 | 2005 | 1967–1980 | Classical archaeologist and authority on Mycenaean pottery | |
| — | Daphne Park ‡ | 1921 | 2010 | 1980–1989 | Diplomat and officer for British intelligence (MI6); created a life peer in 1990 as Baroness Park of Monmouth | |
| — | Catherine Pestell (later Hughes) | 1933 | 2014 | 1989–1996 | Diplomat; formerly First Secretary to the Organisation for Economic Cooperation and Development and assistant under-secretary of state at the Foreign Office | |
| | Fiona Caldicott | 1941 | 2021 | 1996–2010 | Psychiatrist and psychotherapist; first woman to be President of the Royal College of Psychiatrists (1993–1996); appointed Dame Commander of the Order of the British Empire (DBE) in 1996 | |
| | Alice Prochaska ‡ | 1947 | | 2010–2017 | Curator and archivist; formerly Director of Special Collections at the British Library and Head Librarian at Yale University | |
| | Janet Royall, Baroness Royall of Blaisdon | 1955 | | 2017–2025 | Politician; Leader of the House of Lords (2008–2010), then Leader of the Opposition in the House of Lords (2010–2015) | |
| | Catherine Royle ‡ | 1963 | | 2025– | Diplomat; British Ambassador to Venezuela (2007–2010) | |
