= 2015 Forest of Dean District Council election =

2015 UK local government election

← 2011	7 May 2015	2019 →

All 48 seats to Forest of Dean District Council 25 seats needed for a majority
	First party	Second party	Third party
Party	Conservative	Labour	UKIP
Seats won	21	13	7
Seat change	▲3	▼4	▲6
Popular vote	27,253	21,022	13,213
Percentage	34.12%	26.32%	16.54%
Swing	▼5.15	▼3.30	▲15.45
	Fourth party	Fifth party	Sixth party
Party	Independent	Green	Liberal Democrats
Seats won	6	1	0
Seat change	▼5	▲1	▼1
Popular vote	8,123	8,176	2,091
Percentage	10.17%	10.24%	2.62%
Swing	▼9.43	▲6.64	▼4.21
Council control before election
No Overall Control
Council control after election
No Overall Control

Elections for all seats on Forest of Dean District Council were held on 7 May 2015 as part of the 2015 United Kingdom local elections. No party gained overall control.

The Conservatives remained the largest party on the council, having increased their number of Councillors, but failing to gain an overall majority. This election saw the Green Party gain their first seats on the council, while the Liberal Democrats lost their only Councillor.

2015 local election results in the Forest of Dean

== Ward results ==
=== Alvington, Aylburton & West Lydney ===
Alvington, Aylburton & West Lydney (2 seats)
Party	Candidate	Votes	%	±%
Conservative	Frankie Evans	747	44.02	−5.70
UKIP	Jim Simpson	659	20.70	+20.70
Conservative	Marion Murdoch Winship	654		
Labour	Hazel Joan Brookshaw	599	18.82	−2.46
Green	Alan David Olney	405	12.72	+12.72
Independent	Claude Ronald Mickleson	119	3.74	+3.74
Turnout				
Conservative hold		Swing		
UKIP gain from Independent		Swing		

=== Awre ===
Awre (1 seat)
Party	Candidate	Votes	%	±%
Conservative	Gareth Rhys Hughes	353	37.12	−13.31
Green	Andy Blake	341	35.86	−13.71
UKIP	Roger Ashley Jean Wilkinson	257	27.02	+27.02
Turnout				
Conservative hold		Swing		

=== Berry Hill ===
Berry Hill (1 seat)
Party	Candidate	Votes	%	±%
Labour	Tim Gwilliam	459	51.00	−4.15
Conservative	Nigel John Bluett	319	35.44	−9.40
Green	Tony Clapp	122	13.56	+13.56
Turnout				
Labour hold		Swing		

=== Blaisdon and Longhope ===
Blaisdon and Longhope (1 seat)
Party	Candidate	Votes	%	±%
Independent	Dave East	551	47.91	−14.24
Conservative	Kate Elisabeth Robinson	260	22.61	−7.06
Labour	Jan Royall	142	12.35	+4.17
UKIP	Ian Mitchell Aitken	137	11.91	+11.91
Green	Nicky Packer	60	5.22	+5.22
Turnout				
Independent hold		Swing		

=== Bream ===
Bream (2 seats)
Party	Candidate	Votes	%	±%
Labour	Paul John Hiett	597	36.23	−12.38
UKIP	Richard Nicholas Leppington	528	30.45	+30.45
Labour	Bill Evans	513		
Conservative	Brian Joseph Edwards	464	26.31	−13.44
UKIP	Averil Elizabeth Sumners	405		
Conservative	Julia Ann Lawton	342		
Green	Paul Tyrone Lounds	215	7.02	+7.02
Turnout				
Labour hold		Swing		
UKIP gain from Labour		Swing		

=== Bromsberrow & Dymock ===
Bromsberrow & Dymock (1 seat)
Party	Candidate	Votes	%	±%
Conservative	Roger Yeates	686	57.89	+4.64
UKIP	Simon Roberts	309	26.08	+26.08
Green	Sue Clarke	190	16.03	+16.3
Turnout				
Conservative hold		Swing		

=== Christchurch and English Bicknor ===
Christchurch and English Bicknor (1 seat)
Party	Candidate	Votes	%	±%
Conservative	Marrilyn Jane Smart	413	42.23	−57.77
Labour	Jamie Elsmore	253	25.87	+25.87
UKIP	Ralph Lawrence Wintle	150	15.34	+15.34
Independent	Eileen Marie Dyer	87	8.90	+8.90
Green	Geraint Slingsby Williams	75	7.67	+7.67
Turnout				
Conservative hold		Swing		

Note: During the 2011 elections, this ward was only contested by the Conservatives, who were elected unopposed.

=== Churcham and Huntley ===
Churcham and Huntley (1 seat)
Party	Candidate	Votes	%	±%
Conservative	Brian Anthony Jones	413	37.51	−5.90
Independent	Alan Stephen Wood	272	24.70	−17.28
UKIP	Sandy Sparks	232	21.07	+21.07
Labour	Shaun Brown	115	10.45	−4.16
Green	Alan Rupert Clarke	69	6.27	+6.27
Turnout				
Conservative hold		Swing		

=== Cinderford East ===
Cinderford East (2 seats)
Party	Candidate	Votes	%	±%
Labour	Max Coborn	749	54.80	−16.42
Labour	Di Martin	689		
Conservative	Grace Bensted	355	25.19	−3.59
UKIP	Aodha Daithi Conall O'Carroll	336	12.80	+12.80
Conservative	Donald Leonard Ogilvie Horne	306		
Green	Kate De Selincourt	189	7.20	+7.20
Turnout				
Labour hold		Swing		
Labour hold		Swing		

=== Cinderford West ===
Cinderford West (3 seats)
Party	Candidate	Votes	%	±%
Labour	Graham Leslie Morgan	1,064	45.62	−17.12
Labour	Lynn Iris Sterry	831		
Labour	Roger Anthony Sterry	712		
UKIP	Roy Bardo	672	21.44	+21.44
UKIP	Ann Guyton	553		
Conservative	Diana Katherine Bensted	534	25.90	+2.64
Conservative	Charles William Wray Smart	476		
Conservative	Jonathan Burns	470		
Green	Jill Raymond	402	7.04	+7.04
Turnout				
Labour hold		Swing		
Labour hold		Swing		
Labour hold		Swing		

=== Coleford Central ===
Coleford Central (2 seats)
Party	Candidate	Votes	%	±%
Conservative	Carole Ann Allaway Martin	583	33.22	−7.98
Independent	Clive Terence Elsmore	487	17.84	−3.63
Labour	Gray Grindle	439	31.21	−6.11
Labour	Kate Williams	413		
Conservative	Nicholas Gordan Wright	324		
Liberal Democrats	Heather Margaret Lusty	272	9.96	+9.96
Green	Andrew Peter Clarke	212	7.77	+7.77
Turnout				
Conservative hold		Swing		
Independent hold		Swing		

=== Coleford East ===
Coleford East (3 seats)
Party	Candidate	Votes	%	±%
Labour	Roger John James	951	41.41	+4.39
UKIP	Martin Robert Hill	914	15.14	+15.14
Conservative	David William Easton	866	27.04	−11.76
Labour	Yazmine Zora Alimi	860		
Conservative	Denis Riley	766		
Labour	Malcolm Thomas Sadley	688		
Independent	Maria Ann Edey	447	7.41	−7.40
Green	Elliot Dean Clarke	436	7.22	+7.22
Independent	Danny Faux	107	1.77	+1.77
Turnout				
Labour hold		Swing		
UKIP gain from Labour		Swing		
Conservative gain from Independent		Swing		

=== Hartpury ===
Hartpury (1 seat)
Party	Candidate	Votes	%	±%
Independent	Philip Howard Joseph Burford	601	55.75	−0.94
Conservative	Ben Stone	378	35.6	−8.24
Green	Caroline Vieira	99	9.18	+9.18
Turnout				
Independent hold		Swing		

=== Hewelsfield and Woolaston ===
Hewelsfield and Woolaston (1 seat)
Party	Candidate	Votes	%	±%
Conservative	Patrick Christopher John Molyneux	605	53.54	−9.69
Green	Robin Charles Larkham	192	16.99	−19.78
UKIP	Sandra Hazel Leppington	167	14.78	+14.78
Labour	Jane Johnson	166	14.69	+14.69
Turnout				
Conservative hold		Swing		

=== Littledean & Ruspidge ===
Littledean & Ruspidge (2 seats)
Party	Candidate	Votes	%	±%
Conservative	David John Hawthorne	736	31.06	−6.41
Labour	Bernie O'Neill	566	25.96	−9.33
Conservative	Dawn Lucas	513		
Labour	Rowland David Pritchard	478		
Green	Sid Phelps	469	21.39	+21.39
UKIP	David O'Carroll	448	21.59	+21.59
UKIP	Anthony Reeve	420		
Green	Bob Rhodes	391		
Turnout				
Conservative hold		Swing		
Labour hold		Swing		

=== Lydbrook & Ruardean ===
Lydbrook & Ruardean (3 seats)
Party	Candidate	Votes	%	±%
Independent	Andrew Edward Gardiner	927	13.02	−10.79
Labour	Bruce Alan Hogan	865	31.7	−6.41
UKIP	Colin Firth Guyton	817	21.36	+7.97
Labour	Karen Leigh Brown	813		
UKIP	Jimmy Jewell	704		
Conservative	Joanna Carolyn Markham	636	25.83	+0.51
Conservative	Sarah Cuthbert	631		
Green	Eddie Parsons	621	8.72	+8.72
Conservative	Helen Mary Victoria McMillan	572		
Labour	David Stewart Thomson	534		
Turnout				
Independent hold		Swing		
Labour hold		Swing		
UKIP gain from Labour		Swing		

=== Lydney East ===
Lydney East (3 seats)
Party	Candidate	Votes	%	±%
Conservative	James Arthur Bevan	955	35.06	−1.24
UKIP	Carol Elizabeth Harris	861	26.34	+26.34
Labour	Bill Osborne	818	26.20	−0.64
Labour	Val Hobman	787		
UKIP	Claire Elizabeth Vaughan	753		
Conservative	David Cooksley	665		
Conservative	Steph Lord	528		
Green	Steve Stockham	484	7.90	−4.02
Independent	Brian Pearman	276	4.50	+4.50
Turnout				
Conservative hold		Swing		
UKIP gain from Labour		Swing		
Labour hold		Swing		

=== Lydney North ===
Lydney North (1 seat)
Party	Candidate	Votes	%	±%
UKIP	Alan Preest	414	36.64	+36.61
Conservative	Judy Davis	348	30.80	−4.50
Labour	Dave Clarke	261	23.10	−7.27
Green	Destiny Rose Blake	107	9.47	+9.47
Turnout				
UKIP gain from Conservative		Swing		

=== Mitcheldean & Drybrook ===
Mitcheldean & Drybrook (3 seats)
Party	Candidate	Votes	%	±%
Labour	Jackie Fraser	788	31.14	−7.99
Labour	Douglas Martin Scott	689		
Conservative	Brian Richard Robinson	682	26.42	+1.68
Conservative	Zoe Clare Boyles	622		
UKIP	Malcolm Albert Berry	592	18.27	+18.27
UKIP	Steve Beaumont	540		
Independent	Ian Richard Whitburn	517	8.35	−7.35
Labour	Andrew James Knight	542		
Liberal Democrats	Sue Henchley	417	11.44	−8.99
Conservative	Syed Babar Abbas Zaidi	333		
Green	Nigel Duncan Salter	271	4.37	+4.37
Liberal Democrats	Heather Dalziel	165		
Liberal Democrats	Jonathan Gault	127		
Turnout				
Labour hold		Swing		
Labour gain from Independent		Swing		
Conservative hold		Swing		

=== Newent Central ===
Newent Central (2 seats)
Party	Candidate	Votes	%	±%
Independent	Julia Denise Gooch	815	24.65	−7.75
Conservative	Len Lawton	768	40.50	+1.92
Conservative	Eli Heathfield	571		
Labour	Justin Kneen	418	12.64	−3.15
Green	Ken Power	302	9.13	+9.13
Liberal Democrats	Gill Moseley	261	7.89	+7.89
Independent	Nick Winter	171	5.17	+5.17
Turnout				
Independent hold		Swing		
Conservative hold		Swing		

=== Newland and St Briavels ===
Newland and St Briavels (2 seats)
Party	Candidate	Votes	%	±%
Conservative	Terry Hale	791	38.47	+0.18
Green	Chris McFarling	633	18.20	+18.20
Independent	Arthur James Thomas	586	16.85	−4.85
Conservative	Alan Roy John Bensted	547		
Labour	Anna Victoria Parry-Hearn	487	14.00	−5.61
Independent	David Andrew John Wheeler	434	12.48	+12.48
Turnout				
Conservative hold		Swing		
Green gain from Independent		Swing		

=== Newnham & Westbury ===
Newnham & Westbury (2 seats)
Party	Candidate	Votes	%	±%
Conservative	Richard Henry Boyles	679	36.22	+1.90
Independent	Simon Charles Phelps	609	20.91	+20.91
Green	Tom Marshall-Andrews	444	15.24	+1.63
Conservative	Michaela Dawn Lucas	376		
UKIP	John Hector Cumper	293	10.06	+10.06
Labour	Glyn Ford	277	17.58	−0.69
Labour	Alessandro Aled Ford	235		
Turnout				
Conservative hold		Swing		
Independent gain from Independent		Swing		

=== Oxenhall and Newent North East ===
Oxenhall and Newent North East (1 seat)
Party	Candidate	Votes	%	±%
Conservative	Craig Lawton	398	38.34	−39.43
Independent	Martyn Raymond Thomas Vick	280	26.97	+26.97
Independent	Mary Duncan	163	15.70	+15.70
Labour	Gillian Hickling	119	11.46	−10.76
Green	Johnny Back	78	7.51	+7.51
Turnout				
Conservative hold		Swing		

=== Pillowell ===
Pillowell (2 seats)
Party	Candidate	Votes	%	±%
Conservative	Diana Mary Edwards	686	31.51	−5.98
UKIP	Alan Philip Grant	659	29.73	+29.73
Conservative	John Alan Clissold	573		
Labour	Andy Hewlett	569	27.70	+0.43
Labour	Chris Witham	538		
UKIP	John Duncan William McOwan	529		
Green	Andy Moore	442	11.06	−7.81
Turnout				
Conservative hold		Swing		
UKIP gain from Labour		Swing		

=== Redmarley ===
Redmarley (1 seat)
Party	Candidate	Votes	%	±%
Conservative	Clayton Dean Williams	730	62.66	−17.31
UKIP	Alec Robert Tritton	184	15.79	15.79
Labour	Carolyn Hewlett	127	10.90	−9.13
Green	Brian James Greenwood	124	10.64	+10.64
Turnout				
Conservative hold		Swing		

=== Tibberton ===
Tibberton (1 seat)
Party	Candidate	Votes	%	±%
Conservative	Jane Henson Horne	748	66.31	−10.68
Green	David Richard Humphreys	169	14.98	+14.98
Labour	Russell Hickling	138	12.23	−10.78
Liberal Democrats	Ian Iredale King	73	6.47	+6.47
Turnout				
Conservative hold		Swing		

=== Tidenham ===
Tidenham (3 seats)
Party	Candidate	Votes	%	±%
Conservative	Gethyn Joffre Davies	1,060	50.60	−6.01
Conservative	Maria Jane Edwards	897		
Conservative	Helen Mary Molyneux	894		
Labour	David John Pearce	823	11.33	+11.33
Liberal Democrats	Roy William Birch	776	10.69	−11.22
UKIP	Simon Paul Williams	680	9.37	9.37
Independent	Gabriella Kirkpatrick	674	9.28	−12.20
Green	Fiona Bowie	634	8.73	8.73
Turnout				
Conservative gain from Liberal Democrats		Swing		
Conservative gain from Liberal Democrats		Swing		
Conservative hold		Swing		
