= Catherine Royle =

British diplomat

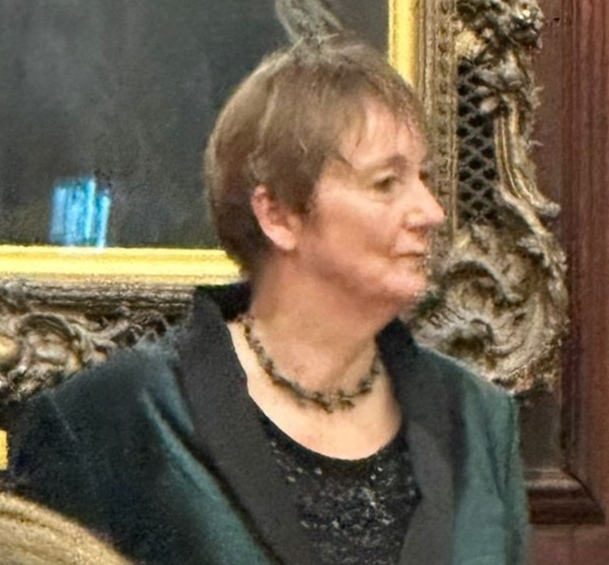
- Royle in October 2025

Principal of Somerville College, Oxford
- Incumbent
- Assumed office October 2025
- Preceded by: Baroness Royall of Blaisdon

British Ambassador to Venezuela
- In office January 2007 – August 2010
- Monarch: Elizabeth II
- Prime Minister: Gordon Brown; David Cameron
- Preceded by: Donald Lamont
- Succeeded by: Catherine Nettleton

Personal details
- Born: 1963 (age 62–63)
- Education: Somerville College, Oxford (BA); Aberystwyth University (MA)

Catherine Jane Royle de Camprubi (born 1963) is a British diplomat who served as British Ambassador to Venezuela from 2007 to 2010. She was political adviser to the commander of the Allied Joint Force Command Brunssum from 2015 to May 2025. In October 2025, she succeeded Janet Royall, Baroness Royall of Blaisdon as Principal of Somerville College, Oxford.

== Career ==
Catherine Royle gained a BA degree in philosophy, politics and economics (PPE) from Somerville College, Oxford in 1985, later converted into an MA. In 1986, she gained an MA from Aberystwyth University. She joined the Foreign and Commonwealth Office in 1986.

Her first post was in Chile. She returned to the UK at the end of 1991 where she worked on various aspects of UK policy in Iraq until 1997. Royle then served in Dublin, and from 2001 to 2003 as Head of the Policy Unit on the Convention on the Future of Europe. She acted as policy adviser to Peter Hain during the drafting of Treaty of Lisbon.

Royle spent seven years in Latin America where she served as Deputy Head of Mission in Buenos Aires (2003–2006) and as British Ambassador to Venezuela (2007–2010), succeeding Donald Lamont and preceding Catherine Nettleton.

In September 2010, she was posted to Kabul as Deputy Ambassador at the British Embassy. In August 2012 she took up the role as Head of the Secretariat of the International Police Co-ordination Board, and later served at personal adviser to the Interior Minister of Iraq.

Royle joined NATO in January 2015 as political adviser to the commander of the Allied Joint Force Command Brunssum. In 2017, she was awarded the NATO Meritorious Service Medal by General Salvatore Farina.

In February 2025, it was announced by Somerville College, Oxford that in October 2025 Royle would succeed Janet Royall, Baroness Royall of Blaisdon as Principal of Somerville College, Oxford, of which she is an Honorary Fellow.

Diplomatic posts
Preceded by Donald Lamont	British Ambassador to Venezuela; 2007 – 2010	Succeeded by Catherine Nettleton
Academic offices
Preceded by Baroness Royall of Blaisdon	Principal of Somerville College, Oxford; 2025–	Succeeded by Incumbent
