= Richard Ralph =

British diplomat

Richard Peter Ralph CMG CVO (born 27 April 1946) is a former British diplomat who was ambassador to Peru and then chairman of a mining company that operates in Peru.

== Diplomatic career ==
Ralph was educated at The King's School, Canterbury, and Edinburgh University. He joined the Foreign and Commonwealth Office (FCO) in 1969 and served at Vientiane, Lisbon, Harare and Washington, D.C., as well as at the FCO. He was ambassador to Latvia 1993–95, governor of the Falkland Islands (and commissioner for South Georgia and the South Sandwich Islands) 1996–99, ambassador to Romania and concurrently to Moldova 1999–2002, and ambassador to Peru 2003–06.

While Ralph was ambassador to Romania, the government sold its national steel firm, Sidex, to a company owned by Lakshmi Mittal, a major donor to the British Labour party which was then in power under Tony Blair as prime minister. Ralph was said to have a mistress who was employed by a legal firm which worked on the steel deal, and he had previously worked alongside Jonathan Powell, who later became Blair's chief of staff, at the British Embassy in Washington. However, Ralph was defended by the foreign secretary, Jack Straw.

== Monterrico Metals ==
Ralph left the diplomatic service in 2006 and became executive chairman of Monterrico Metals plc, a publicly listed company with a copper mine at Rio Blacos in Peru. In 2008 he was fined for insider trading associated with Monterrico Metals.

== Sources ==
- RALPH, Richard Peter, Who's Who 2014, A & C Black, 2014; online edn, Oxford University Press, 2014

Diplomatic posts
Preceded by Richard Samuel	Ambassador to Latvia; 1993–1995	Succeeded by Nicholas Jarrold
Government offices
Preceded by David Tatham	Governor of the Falkland Islands; 1996–1999	Succeeded by Donald Lamont
Diplomatic posts
Preceded by Christopher Crabbie	Ambassador to Romania and Moldova; 2000–2002	Succeeded by Quinton Quayle
Preceded by Roger Hart	Ambassador to Peru; 2003–2006	Succeeded by Catherine Nettleton
