= Donald Lamont =

British diplomat

Donald Alexander Lamont (born 13 January 1947) is a retired British diplomat who was Governor of the Falkland Islands and Commissioner for South Georgia and the South Sandwich Islands from 1999 to 2002.

== Career ==
Lamont attended Aberdeen Grammar School, then graduated in Russian Studies from the University of Aberdeen. He was employed in the motor industry for four years (1970–74) He was a member of Her Majesty's Diplomatic Service from 1974 to 2006. He served in Austria, the Soviet Union, Berlin (through the Fall of the Wall), and Bosnia & Herzegovina. He was British Ambassador to Uruguay (1991–94), Governor of the Falkland Islands and Commissioner for South Georgia and the South Sandwich Islands (1999–2002) and British Ambassador to Venezuela (2003–06). After retirement he was Chief Executive of Wilton Park (2007–09).

He served as Chairman of the UK Antarctic Heritage Trust, He was a Founding Board Member of Sistema Scotland, Trustee of "Enable Me" (a disability awareness charity based in Sussex), Chairman of the British Uruguayan Society; Chairman of Friends of the Falkland Islands Museum and the Jane Cameron National Archives, and is now Chairman of the Falklands Maritime Heritage Trust (FMHT). The FMHT organised and funded the Endurance22 Expedition that in 2022 located, filmed and surveyed the wreck of Sir Ernest Shackleton's ship, Endurance.

== Personal life ==
Lamont lives in Stirling, Scotland.

Diplomatic posts
Preceded by Colum John Sharkey	British Ambassador to Uruguay; 1991–1994	Succeeded by Robert Hendrie
Government offices
Preceded by Richard Ralph	Governor of the Falkland Islands and Commissioner for South Georgia and the South Sandwich Islands; 1999–2002	Succeeded by Howard Pearce
Diplomatic posts
Preceded by John Hughes	British Ambassador to Venezuela; 2003–2006	Succeeded by Catherine Royle
