= Catherine Nettleton =

British diplomat

Catherine Nettleton CMG OBE
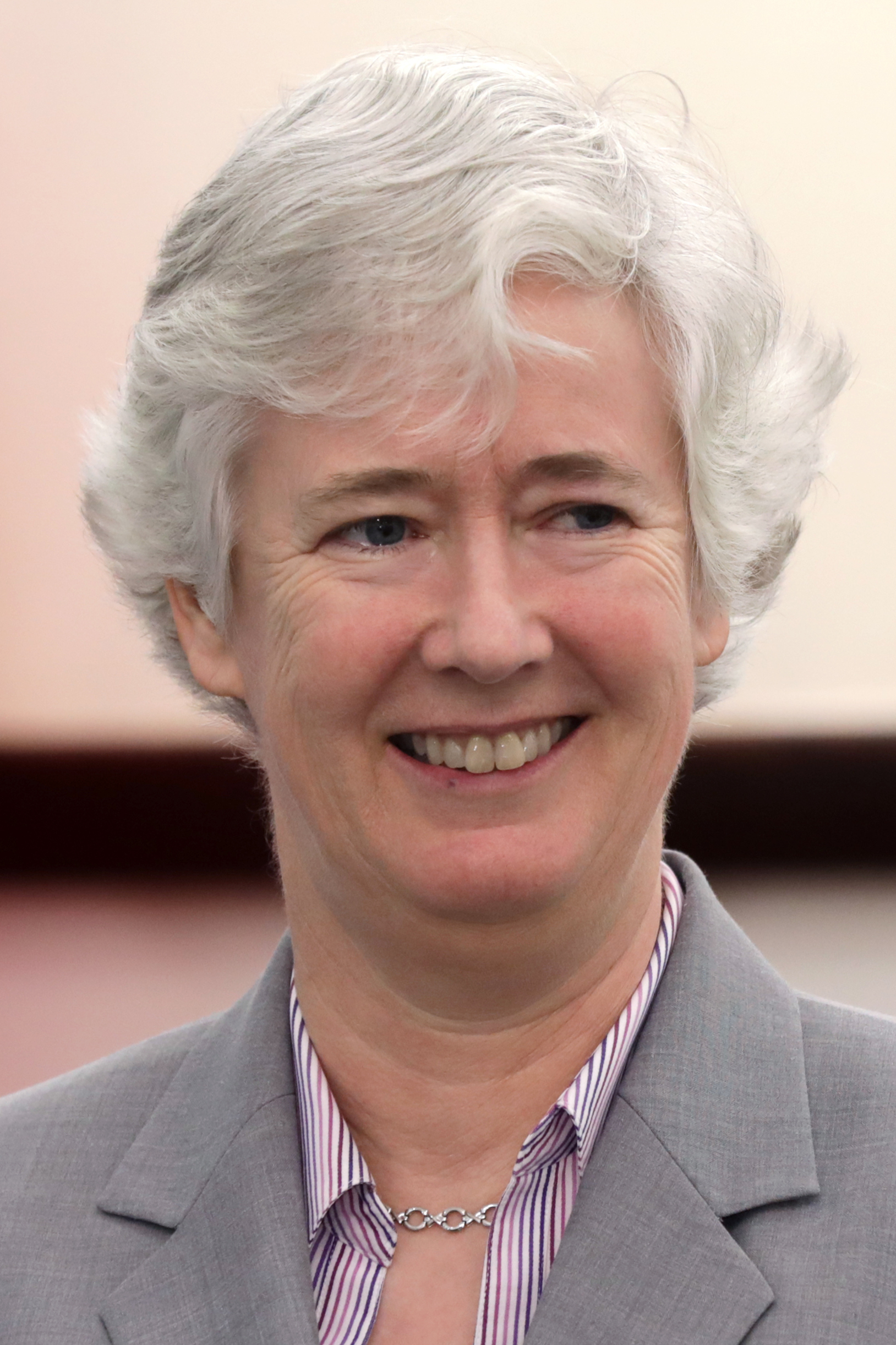
- Nettleton in 2020

Representative, British Office Taipei
- In office December 2016 – December 2020
- Monarch: Elizabeth II
- Prime Minister: Theresa May; Boris Johnson
- Preceded by: Damion Potter
- Succeeded by: Andrew Pittam

British Ambassador to Venezuela
- In office August 2010 – 2014
- Monarch: Elizabeth II
- Prime Minister: David Cameron
- Preceded by: Catherine Royle
- Succeeded by: John Saville

British Ambassador to Peru
- In office 2006–2010
- Monarch: Elizabeth II
- Prime Minister: Tony Blair; Gordon Brown
- Preceded by: Richard Ralph
- Succeeded by: James Dauris

Personal details
- Born: 13 March 1960 (age 66)
- Education: University of Exeter (BA); University of Manchester (MA)

Catherine Nettleton CMG OBE (born 13 March 1960) is a British diplomat who has been ambassador to Peru, ambassador to Venezuela, and UK Representative in Taiwan.

== Career ==
Catherine Elizabeth Nettleton gained a BA degree from Exeter University and an MA from Manchester University. She worked for the Inland Revenue for a year before joining the Foreign and Commonwealth Office (FCO) in 1983. She learned Mandarin Chinese and served in British Embassy Beijing 1987–89 and also in 2000–03. She also served in British Embassy Mexico City and at the FCO. After six months at the Royal College of Defence Studies in 2004, she was Head of FCO Services (Presidencies) 2004–05 (at this time the UK held the presidencies of both the G8 and the EU). She was Ambassador to Peru 2006–10 and Ambassador to Venezuela 2010–14. In 2015 she became Director of Protocol at the FCO and deputy Marshal of the Diplomatic Corps. In 2016 she was appointed as the Representative at the British Office Taipei. Nettleton stepped down from her post in Taipei in December 2020.

== Honours ==
Nettleton was appointed Officer of the Order of the British Empire (OBE) in the 1999 Birthday Honours and Companion of the Order of St Michael and St George (CMG) in the 2015 New Year Honours.

Diplomatic posts
Preceded by Richard Ralph	British Ambassador to Peru; 2006 – 2010	Succeeded by James Dauris
Preceded by Catherine Royle	British Ambassador to Venezuela; 2010 – 2014	Succeeded by John Saville
Preceded by Damion Potter	Representative, British Office Taipei; 2016 – 2020	Succeeded by Andrew Pittam (acting)
