= Janet Royall, Baroness Royall of Blaisdon =

British politician and life peer (born 1955)

The Right Honourable The Baroness Royall of Blaisdon PC
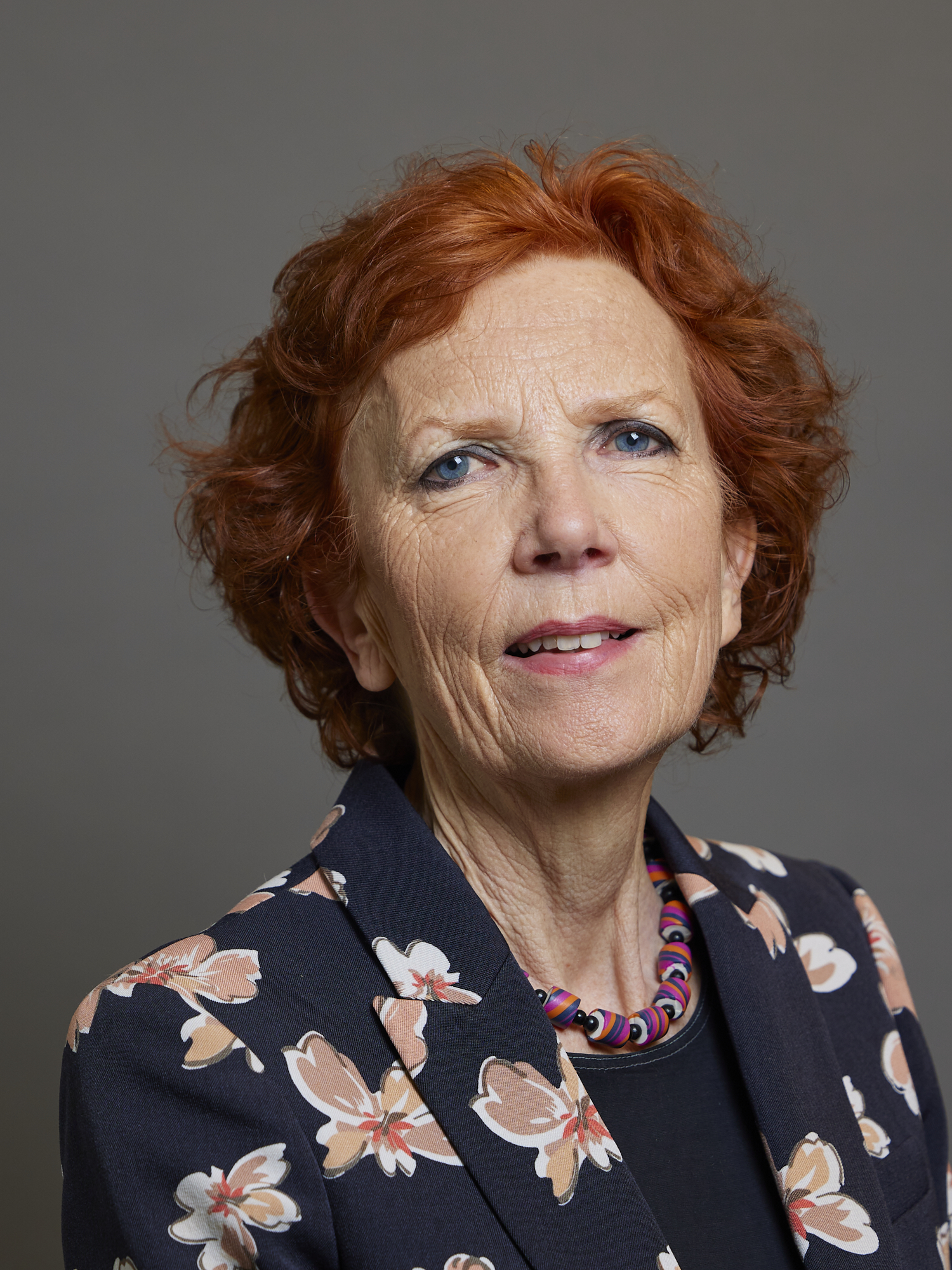
- Official portrait, 2024

Principal of Somerville College, Oxford
- In office August 2017 – October 2025
- Preceded by: Alice Prochaska
- Succeeded by: Catherine Royle

Leader of the Opposition in the Lords Shadow Leader of the House of Lords
- In office 11 May 2010 – 27 May 2015
- Leader: Harriet Harman (Acting); Ed Miliband
- Preceded by: The Lord Strathclyde
- Succeeded by: The Baroness Smith of Basildon
Ministerial offices 2005–2010
Chancellor of the Duchy of Lancaster
In office 5 June 2009 – 11 May 2010
Prime Minister	Gordon Brown
Preceded by	Liam Byrne
Succeeded by	The Lord Strathclyde
Leader of the House of Lords
In office 3 October 2008 – 11 May 2010
Prime Minister	Gordon Brown
Preceded by	The Baroness Ashton of Upholland
Succeeded by	The Lord Strathclyde
Lord President of the Council
In office 2 October 2008 – 5 June 2009
Prime Minister	Gordon Brown
Preceded by	The Baroness Ashton of Upholland
Succeeded by	The Lord Mandelson
Chief Whip of the House of Lords Captain of the Honourable Corps of Gentlemen-at-Arms
In office 24 January 2008 – 3 October 2008
Prime Minister	Gordon Brown
Preceded by	The Lord Grocott
Succeeded by	The Lord Bassam of Brighton
Baroness-in-waiting Government Whip
In office 10 May 2005 – 25 January 2008
Prime Minister	Tony Blair; Gordon Brown
Preceded by	The Lord Triesman
Succeeded by	The Baroness Thornton

Member of the House of Lords
- Lord Temporal
- Life peerage 25 June 2004

Personal details
- Born: 20 August 1955 (age 71) Gloucester, Gloucestershire, England
- Party: Labour and Co-operative
- Spouse: Stuart Hercock (m. 1980; died 2010)
- Children: 3
- Education: Westfield College, London (BA) Modern Languages (French and Spanish)

Janet Anne Royall, Baroness Royall of Blaisdon (born 20 August 1955), is a British Labour Co-operative Party politician. A former secretary and adviser to Neil Kinnock, Royall was appointed to the House of Lords in 2004 after having stood unsuccessfully to be MEP for The Cotswolds, and to be MP for Ipswich and Ogmore. She also stood to be a member of Gloucestershire County Council.

From October 2008, she was Leader of the House of Lords for the last eighteen months of Gordon Brown's premiership.

Royall was Principal of Somerville College, Oxford from August 2017 until October 2025 and was a candidate in the 2024 University of Oxford Chancellor election. She was succeeded by Catherine Royle in October 2025. She is the current Chair of the Association of Leading Visitor Attractions.

== Education and early political career ==
Royall grew up in Gloucestershire in Hucclecote and Newnham on Severn and was educated at the Royal Forest of Dean Grammar School and Westfield College, London, where she gained a 2.2 (BA) degree in Modern Languages (Spanish and French) in 1977.

Royall's first job after graduating was importing flowers from Colombia and she also trained as a secretary. Royall was a secretary and adviser to Neil Kinnock, the leader of the Labour Party, in the 1980s, and she has remained a close ally of his ever since. She is reputed to have bought the infamous donkey jacket worn by former leader Michael Foot for his Rembrance Day appearance at the Cenotaph in 1982.

In 1984, Royall stood to be MEP for The Cotswolds, finishing third with 20.7% of the vote. She sought selection as Labour's candidate for Ipswich in a 2001 by-election, losing to Chris Mole; and for Ogmore in a 2002 by-election, losing to Huw Irranca-Davies. In 2003 she became head of the European Commission office in Wales; her appointment was criticised at the time as "an inappropriate political appointment" by Hans-Gert Pöttering. The head of the EU's offices in the UK, Jim Dougal, told BBC Wales that the appointment was above board and that proper procedures were followed at every stage. Royall did not respond to the demands for her resignation and turned down all requests for interviews.

== House of Lords ==
On 25 June 2004, she was created a life peer as Baroness Royall of Blaisdon, of Blaisdon in the County of Gloucestershire. She spoke for the Labour party on Health, International Development and Foreign and Commonwealth Affairs.

On 24 January 2008 Royall was appointed government chief whip in the House of Lords, on the resignation of Lord Grocott. She was appointed a Privy Counsellor later in the year. On 3 October 2008, she was appointed to the cabinet by Gordon Brown, as Leader of the House of Lords and Lord President of the Council. On 5 June 2009, Royall was succeeded as Lord President by Peter Mandelson, the Business Secretary, and was appointed Chancellor of the Duchy of Lancaster.

She voted for a 100% elected House, on the last occasion that the House of Lords voted on Reform of the House of Lords in March 2007. She has called for a national referendum on any reforms of the chamber.

Since 2012, Royall has campaigned for tougher sentencing for people convicted of stalking offences, including the successful tabling of an amendment to increase the maximum sentence for stalking. She has advocated for cross-agency information sharing to enable joined-up approaches to combatting stalking.

In September 2012, she spoke out against the proposed badger cull.

In 2013, Royall stood for election to Gloucestershire County Council, finishing fourth with 12% of the vote.

She announced in May 2015 that she would not seek re-election as the Leader of the Opposition in the House of Lords.

In 2016, she chaired an investigation into allegations of antisemitism in Oxford University Labour Club and was subsequently one of two Vice-Chairs of the Chakrabarti Inquiry into antisemitism in the UK Labour Party. Royall's report concluded that people thrown out of the Labour Party for anti-semitic views should not be banned for life.

Royall voted against the Higher Education (Freedom of Speech) Act 2023 citing concerns about the bureaucracy the Bill would entail as well as her opposition to proposed fines. Royall has spoken in the Lords about the importance of free speech in universities and her belief that existing legislation is sufficient. In October 2024, the Free Speech Union commented that Royall had an "apparently lackadaisical approach to free speech."

== Principal of Somerville College ==
In February 2017, Somerville College, Oxford, announced the selection of Baroness Royall as its next principal. She succeeded Alice Prochaska at the end of August 2017. In 2019, Royall attracted media attention following her decision to remove octopus from the college menu and supported the introduction of gender-neutral toilets. As Principal, Royall implemented mandatory unconscious bias training for students, leading to criticism from Toby Young of the Free Speech Union.

She also oversaw an expansion of scholarship provision at Somerville College and initiated outreach to local primary schools. She served as Chair of the Conference of Colleges from 2020 to 2023 and for two years before that was Deputy Chair. In 2021, Royall led a campaign for Somerville to become a College of Sanctuary, offering a pathway to Oxford for students displaced by war or internal unrest. The University of Oxford later adopted this campaign and formed such a Community of Sanctuary. In May 2024, Royall instructed Thames Valley Police, who were monitoring pro-Palestine protests, to leave the grounds of Somerville College. In 2024, the UK Campaign Against Anti-Semitism wrote a formal letter of complaint after the Somerville College magazine, with a foreword by Royall, omitted any mention of Jewish victims in three articles on the Holocaust. It was announced that she would be standing down from the role of Principal of Somerville College at the end of the 2024/25 academic year at the age of 70.

== Personal life ==
She was married to Stuart Hercock from 1980 until his death in 2010, and has three children.

Political offices
Preceded by The Lord Grocott	Chief Whip in the House of Lords; 2007–2008	Succeeded by The Lord Bassam of Brighton
Preceded by The Lord Grocott	Captain of the Honourable Corps of Gentlemen-at-Arms; 2007–2008	Succeeded by The Lord Bassam of Brighton
Preceded by Catherine Ashton	Lord President of the Council; 2008–2009	Succeeded by Peter Mandelson
Preceded by Catherine Ashton	Leader of the House of Lords; 2008–2010	Succeeded by The Lord Strathclyde
Preceded by Liam Byrne	Chancellor of the Duchy of Lancaster; 2009–2010	Succeeded by The Lord Strathclyde
Preceded by The Lord Strathclyde	Shadow Leader of the House of Lords; 2010–2015	Succeeded by The Baroness Smith of Basildon
Party political offices
Preceded by The Baroness Ashton of Upholland	Leader of the Labour Party in the House of Lords; 2008–2015	Succeeded by The Baroness Smith of Basildon
Academic offices
Preceded by Alice Prochaska	Principal of Somerville College, Oxford; 2017–2025	Succeeded by Catherine Royle
