= Somerville College, Oxford =

College of the University of Oxford

Somerville College
- University of Oxford
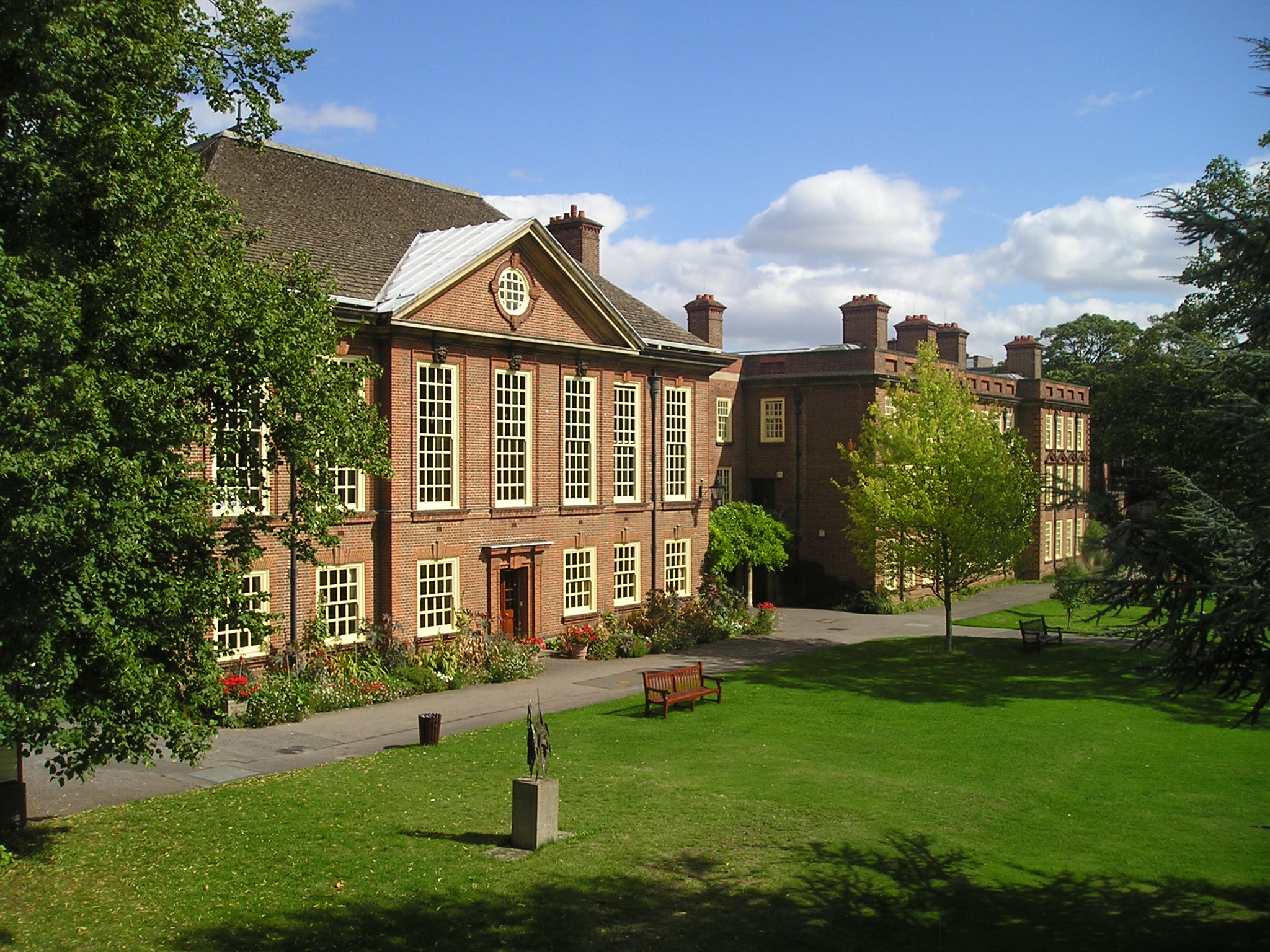
- Somerville College Hall

- Arms: Argent, three mullets in chevron reversed gules, between six crosses crosslet fitched sable
- Location: Woodstock Road, Oxford OX2 6HD
- Coordinates: 51°45′33″N 1°15′45″W
- Full name: Somerville College in the University of Oxford
- Latin name: Collegium de Somerville
- Motto: Donec rursus impleat orbem (translated: Until it should fill the world again)
- Established: 1879; 147 years ago
- Named for: Mary Somerville
- Former names: Somerville Hall (1879–1894)
- Colours
- Sister college: Girton College, Cambridge
- Principal: Catherine Royle
- Undergraduates: 437 (2020–21)
- Postgraduates: 235
- Endowment: £106 million (2021)
- Website: www.some.ox.ac.uk
- Boat club: Somerville College Boat Club

Map
- Location within Oxford city centre

Somerville College is a constituent college of the University of Oxford in England. It was founded in 1879 as Somerville Hall, one of its first two women's colleges. It began admitting men in 1994. The college's liberal tone derives from its founding by social liberals, as Oxford's first non-denominational college for women, unlike the Anglican Lady Margaret Hall, the other to open that year. In 1964, it was among the first to cease locking up at night to stop students staying out late. No gowns are worn at formal halls.

In 2021 it was recognised as a sanctuary campus by City of Sanctuary UK. It is one of three colleges to offer undergraduates on-site lodging throughout their course. It stands near the Science Area, University Parks, Oxford University Press, Jericho, and Green Templeton, St Anne's, Keble and St Benet's. Over a third of its 650 students are not from the UK. Over half the UK admissions are from state schools – close to the university average. Its total net assets decreased from £238 million after 2021, recovering its value in 2024, and reached £247.6 million in 2025, the seventh highest of an Oxford undergraduate college. Its sister college at Cambridge is Girton.

Among its alumnae have been Margaret Thatcher, Indira Gandhi, Dorothy Hodgkin, Iris Murdoch, Philippa Foot, Vera Brittain and Dorothy L. Sayers.

== History ==
=== Founding ===
In June 1878, the Association for the Higher Education of Women was formed, aiming for the eventual creation of a college for women in Oxford. Some of the more prominent members of the association were George Granville Bradley, Master of University College, T. H. Green, a prominent liberal philosopher and Fellow of Balliol College, and Edward Stuart Talbot, Warden of Keble College. Talbot insisted on a specifically Anglican institution, which was unacceptable to most of the other members. The two parties eventually split, and Talbot's group (the "Christ Church camp") founded Lady Margaret Hall, which opened its doors for students in 1879, the same year as Somerville did.

Thus, in 1879, a second committee was formed to create a college "in which no distinction will be made between students on the ground of their belonging to different religious denominations." This committee was called the "Balliol camp" and had close ties to the Liberal Party. This second committee included A. H. D. Acland, Thomas Hill Green, George William Kitchin, James Legge, Henry Nettleship, Walter Pater, Henry Francis Pelham, its chairman John Percival, Grace Prestwich, Eleanor Smith, A. G. Vernon Harcourt, and Mary Ward. Other people who assisted in the founding were Anna Swanwick, Bertha Johnson, Charlotte Byron Green, and Owen Roberts.

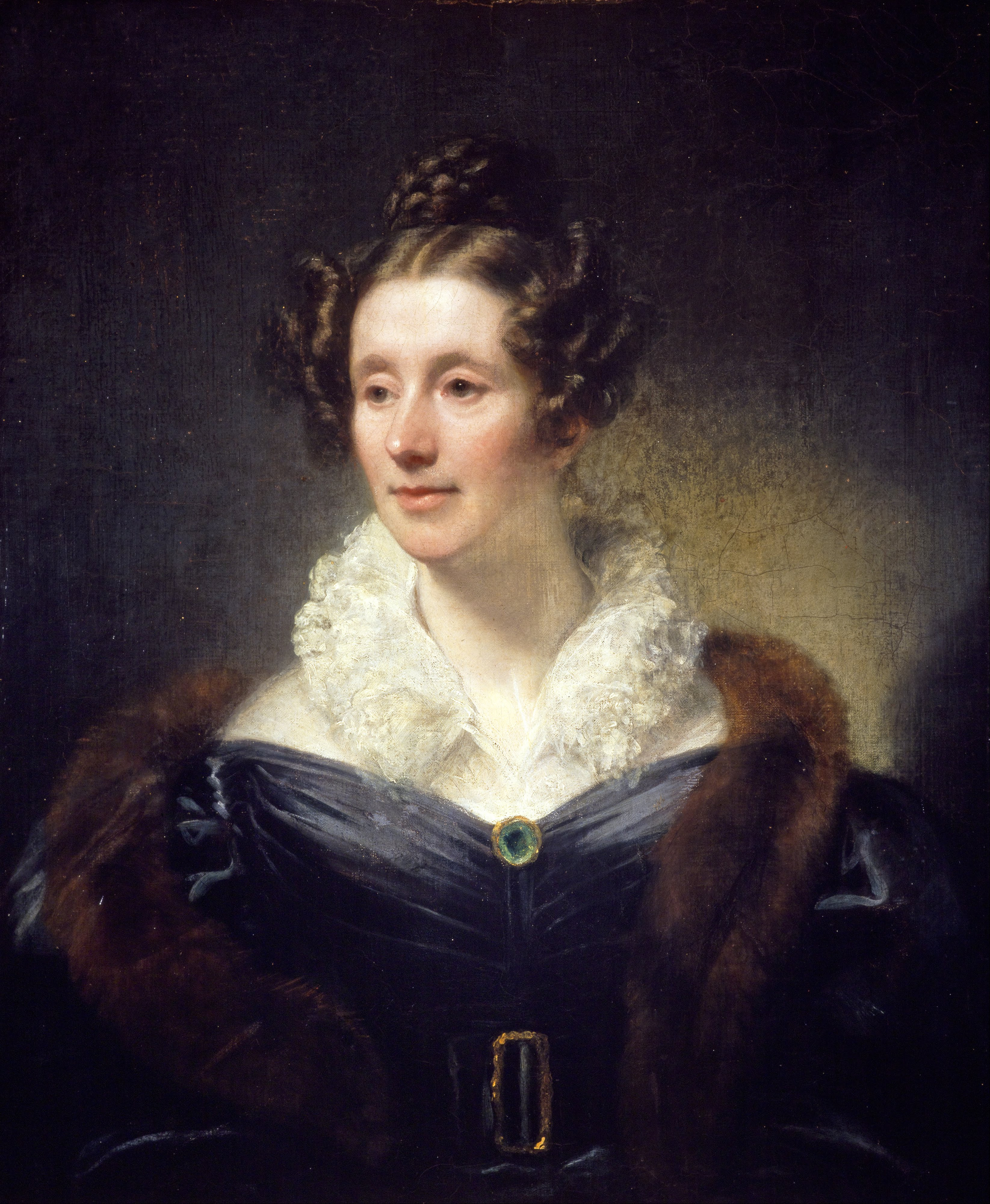
The mathematician and scientist Mary Somerville, 1780–1872, after whom the college is named. Portrait of Mary Somerville by Thomas Phillips, 1834

This new effort resulted in the founding of Somerville Hall, named after the then recently deceased Scottish mathematician and renowned scientific writer Mary Somerville. It was felt that the name would reflect the virtues of liberalism and academic success which the college wished to embody. She was admired by the founders of the college as a scholar, as well as for her religious and political views, including her conviction that women should have equality in terms of suffrage and access to education.

Madeleine Shaw-Lefevre was chosen as the first principal because, though not a well-known academic at the time, her background was felt to reflect the college's political stance. Because of its status as both women's college and non-denominational institution, Somerville was widely regarded within Oxford as "an eccentric and somewhat alarming institution."

=== Women's college ===
When it opened, Somerville Hall had twelve students, ranging in age between 17 and 36. The first 21 students from Somerville and Lady Margaret Hall attended lectures in rooms above a baker's shop on Little Clarendon Street. Just two of the original 12 students admitted in 1879 remained in Oxford for three years, the period of residence required for male students to complete a bachelor's degree.

Increasingly, however, as the college admitted more students, it became more formalised. Somerville appointed Lilla Haigh as its first in-house tutor in 1882, and by the end of the 1890s female students were permitted to attend lectures in almost all colleges. In 1883, the college was visited by the prominent suffragette Susan B. Anthony, calling it "a shelter for girls". In 1891 it became the first women's hall to introduce entrance exams and in 1894 the first of the five women's halls of residence to adopt the title of college (changing its name to Somerville College), the first of them to appoint its own teaching staff, and the first to build a library. In Oxford legend it soon became known as the "bluestocking college", its excellent examination results refuting the widespread belief that women were incapable of high academic achievement.

In the 1910s, Somerville became known for its support for the women's suffrage campaign. Prior to becoming secretary of the Women's Employment Federation Irene Hilton taught natural sciences at Somerville. In 1920, Oxford University allowed women to matriculate and therefore gain degrees. From the college's inception, all female students had to be chaperoned when in the presence of male students. The practice was abolished in 1925, although male visitors to the college were still subject to a curfew. In the same year the college was granted its charter.

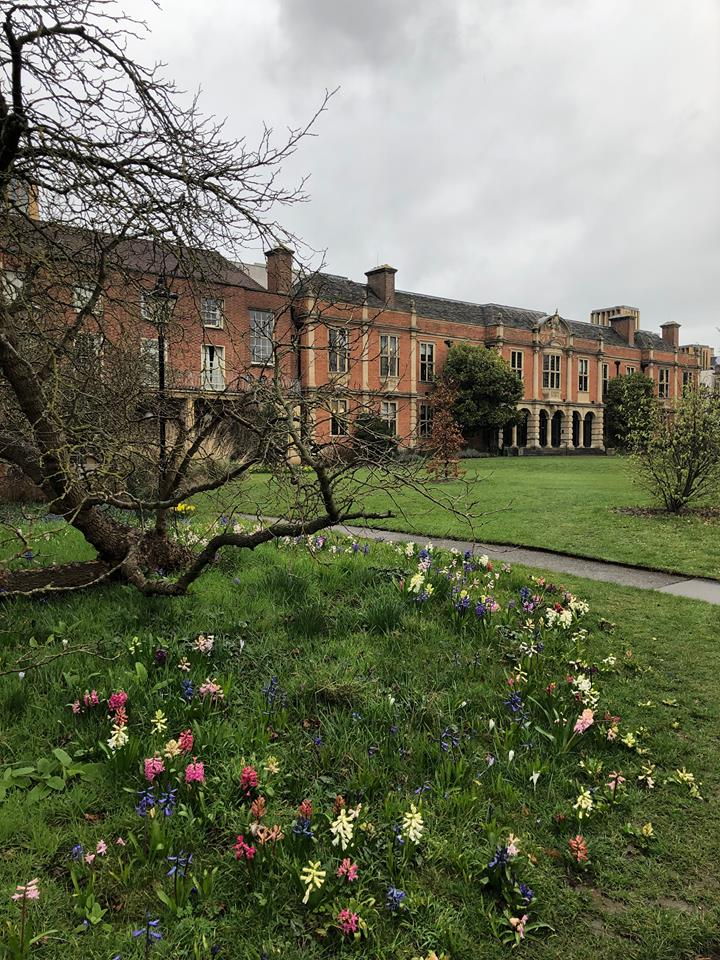
Somerville College Library with hyacinths

=== The Mutual Admiration Society ===
The Mutual Admiration Society (MAS) was a literary society (or literary circle) of women who became friends at Somerville College. Its members included Dorothy L. Sayers, Muriel St Clare Byrne, Charis Frankenburg, Dorothy Rowe, and Amphilis Throckmorton Middlemore, among others.

The society of the title was a real club. The members composed poetry and prose for each other's pleasure. Apart from Sayers, none of them was a household name, though all were notable. Mo Moulton argued in their Agatha Award-winning book, The Mutual Admiration Society: How Dorothy L. Sayers and Her Oxford Circle Remade the World For Women, that each one lived a life worthy of attention.

Years later, the writer Vera Brittain — a Somerville contemporary of the group, but not one of its members — recalled that the MAS “took themselves very seriously”.

=== First World War ===
During the First World War, Somerville College together with the Examination Schools and other Oxford buildings were requisitioned by the War Office to create the Third Southern General Hospital, a facility for the Royal Army Medical Corps to treat military casualties. For the duration of the war, Somerville students relocated to Oriel College. Because many male students had left Oxford to enlist in the military, Somerville was able to rent St Mary Hall Quad which they bricked off from the rest of the college to segregate it from Oriel's remaining male students. Many students and tutors were involved in work in World War I and some of them went to the Western Front in France.

Notable patients who stayed in Somerville include the war poets Robert Graves, Siegfried Sassoon and R. E. Vernède. Sassoon arrived on 2 August 1916. Graves and Sassoon later reminisced about their time at Somerville Hospital: How unlike you to crib my idea of going to the Ladies' College at Oxford, Sassoon wrote to Graves in 1917, and called it very much like Paradise. At Somerville College, Graves met his first love, a nurse and professional pianist called Marjorie. About his time at Somerville, he wrote: I enjoyed my stay at Somerville. The sun shone, and the discipline was easy. Alfred Mills was received in the hospital in 1916 and officer Llewelyn Davies died at the college.

Once the war ended, the return to normality between Oriel and Somerville was delayed, sparking both frustration and an incident in spring 1919 known as the "Oriel raid," in which male students made a hole in the wall dividing the sexes. In July 1919 the principal (Emily Penrose) and fellows returned to Somerville. Alumna Vera Brittain wrote about the impact of the war in Oxford and paid tribute to the work of the principal, Miss Penrose, in her memoir Testament of Youth.

=== Admission of men ===
Starting in the 1970s, the traditionally all-male colleges in Oxford began to admit female students. Since it was assumed that recruiting from a wider demographic would guarantee better students, there was pressure on single-sex colleges to change their policy to avoid falling down the rankings. All-female colleges, like Somerville, found it increasingly difficult to attract good applicants and fell to the bottom of the intercollegiate academic rankings during the period.

During the 1980s, there was much debate as to whether women's colleges should become mixed. Somerville remained a women's college until 1992, when its statutes were amended to permit male students and fellows; the first male fellows were appointed in 1993, and the first male students admitted in 1994. Somerville became the second-to-last college (after St Hilda's) to become coeducational. A 50 per cent male/female gender balance has been maintained to this day, though without formal quotas.

In the 1890s Somerville helped fashion the "New Woman"; a century later... the college has set itself the perhaps greater challenge of educating the "New Man."

— Pauline Adams, Somerville for Women (1996)

== Buildings and grounds ==
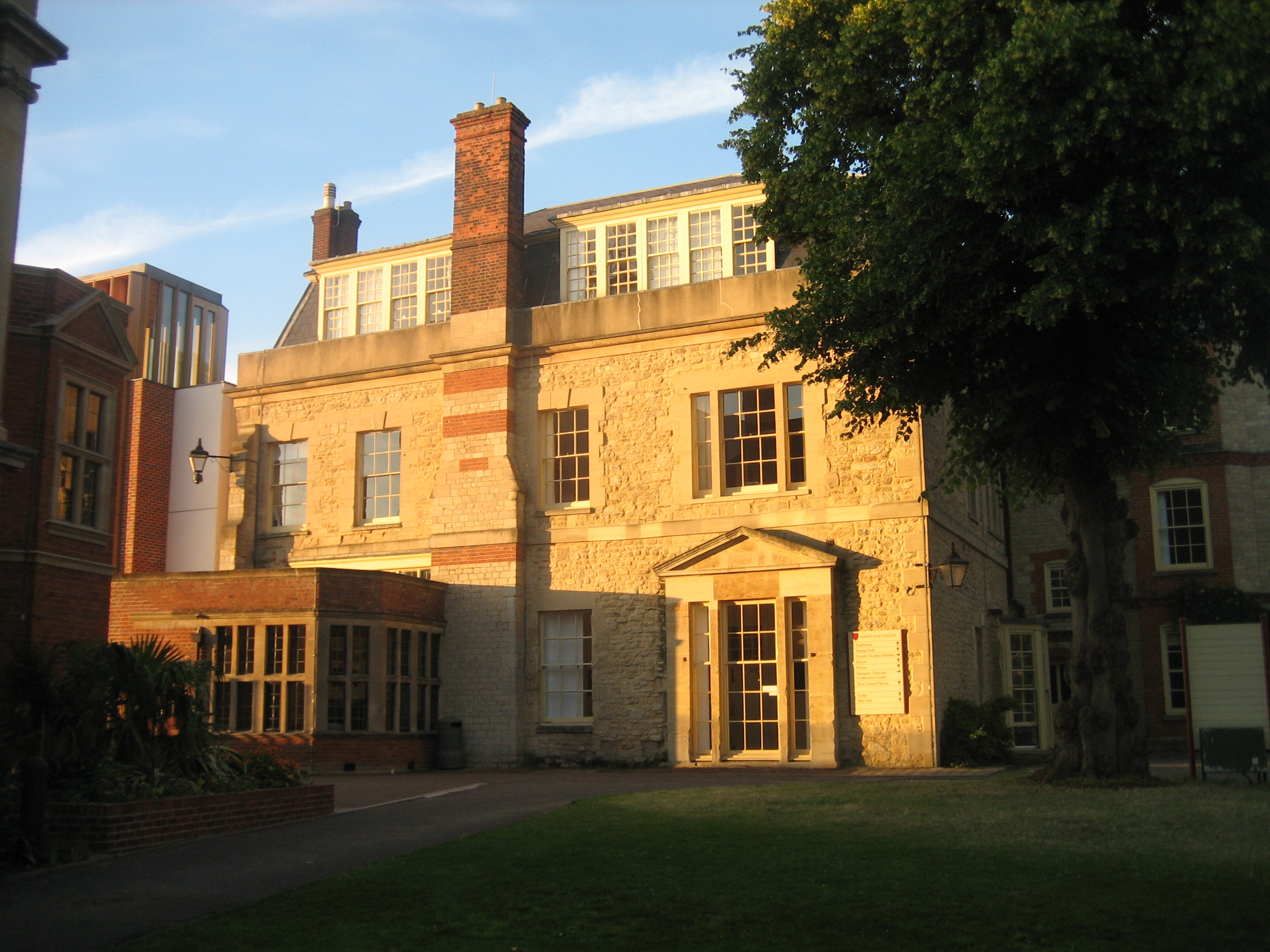
House seen from the Quad

The college and its main entrance, the Porters' Lodge, are located at the southern end of Woodstock Road, with Little Clarendon Street to the south, Walton Street to the west and the Radcliffe Observatory Quarter to the north. The front of the college runs between the Oxford Oratory and the Faculty of Philosophy. Somerville has buildings of various architectural styles, many of which bear the names of former principals of the college, located around one of Oxford's biggest quads. Five buildings are Grade II-listed.

A 2017 archaeological evaluation of the site shows that in the medieval period the area now occupied by Somerville lay in fields beyond the boundary of Oxford. There is evidence of 17th-century building and earthworks beneath the site, some of which almost certainly relates to the defensive network placed around the city by Royalists during the Civil War. There are also remains of some 19th-century buildings, including a stone-lined well.

=== Walton House ===
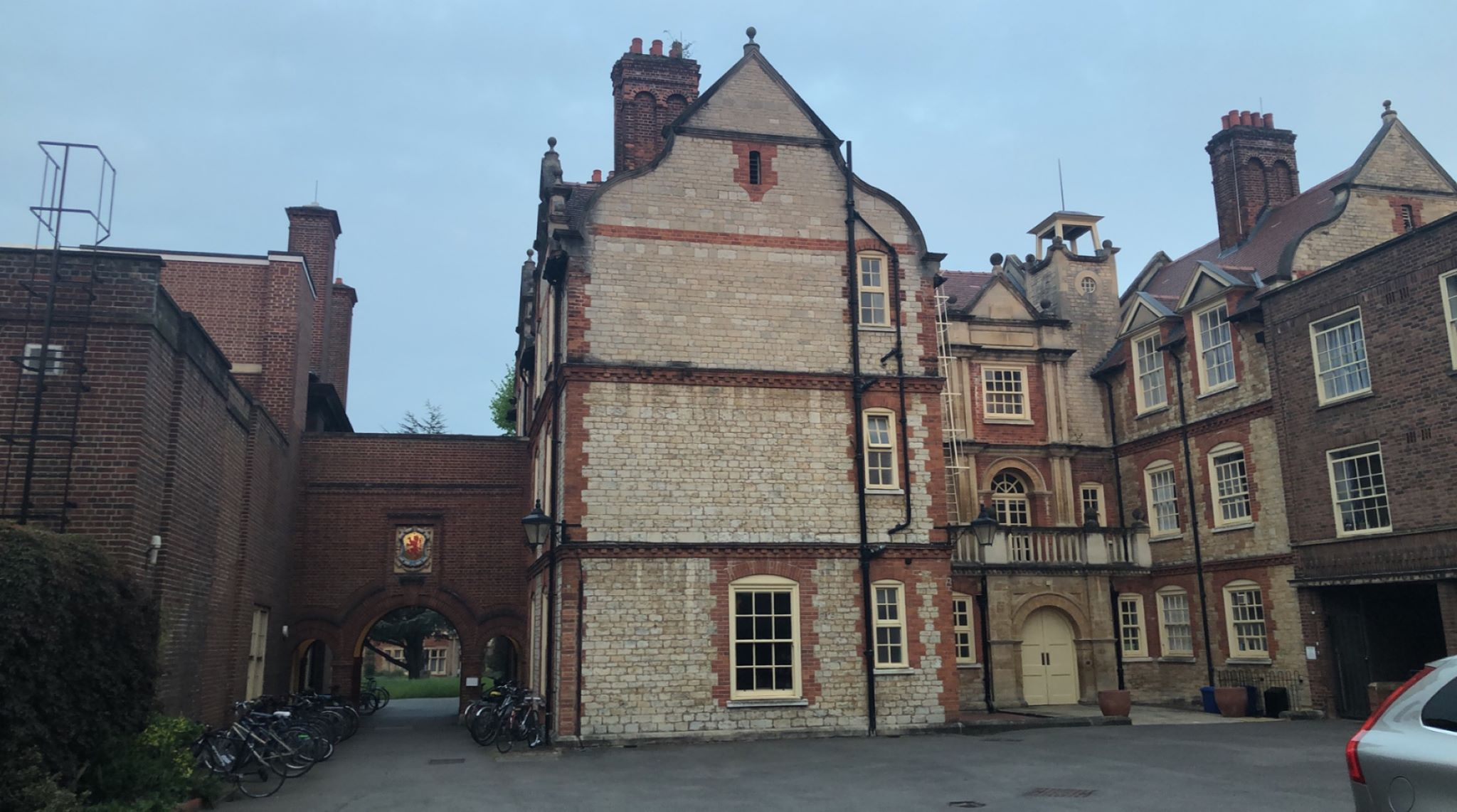
House seen from the east

The original building of Somerville Hall, Walton House (commonly called House) was built in 1826 and purchased from St John's College in 1880 amid fears that the men's colleges might, in the future, repossess the site for their own purposes. The house could only accommodate seven of the twelve students who came up to Oxford in the first year. In 1881, Sir Thomas Graham Jackson was commissioned to build a new south wing which could accommodate eleven more students. In 1892, Walter Cave added a north wing and an extra storey. He also installed a gatehouse at the Woodstock Road entrance. In 1897/98, the Eleanor Smith Cottages were added, adjoining Walton House.

Today House is home to only one or two students, and, until 2014, it housed the college bar. It also contains Green Hall, where guests to college are often greeted and in which prospective students are registered and wait for interviews; some of the college's paintings by Roger Fry are located here. Most of the administration of college, and the academic pigeon-holes are in House, as is the Mary Somerville Room, a reception room featuring paintings by Mary Somerville, George Romney and George Frederic Watts.

=== Park ===
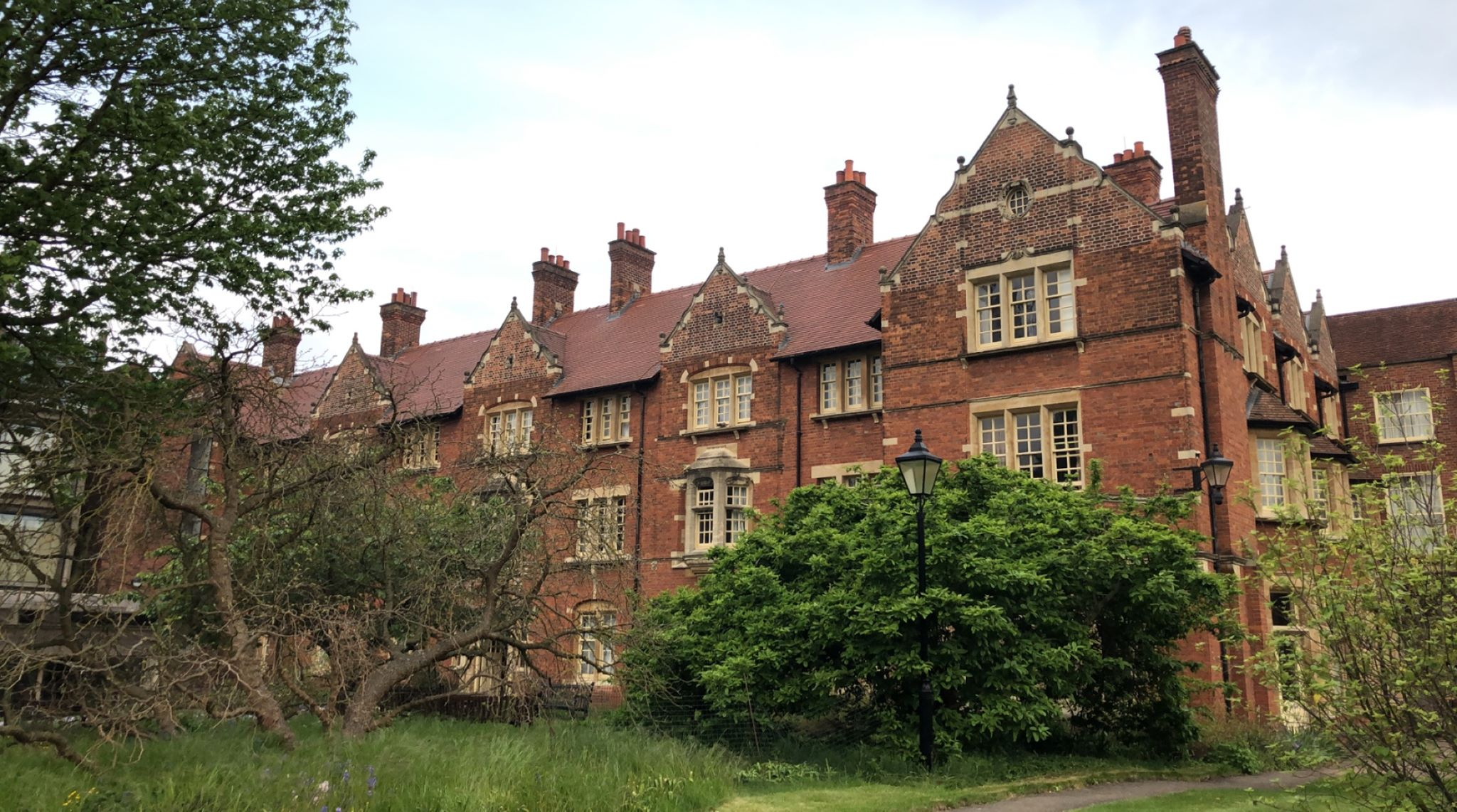
Park Building

Originally known as West, from its location in the college, the idea of building a second self-contained hall was inspired by Newnham College, Cambridge. It was designed by Harry Wilkinson Moore and built in two stages. The 1885–1887 phase saw the construction of rooms for 18 students with their own dining-room, sitting rooms and vice-principal. This was a deliberate policy aimed at replicating the family environment that the women students had left. It had the effect of turning House and West into rivals. The second building stage (1888–1894) created two sets of tutors' rooms, a further 19 rooms and the West Lodge (now Park Lodge). In 2004 it was renamed Park in honour of Daphne Park, Principal from 1980 to 1989.

Today there are over 60 student and fellows' rooms in the building along with a music room and a computer room. Park is a Grade II-listed building.

=== Library ===
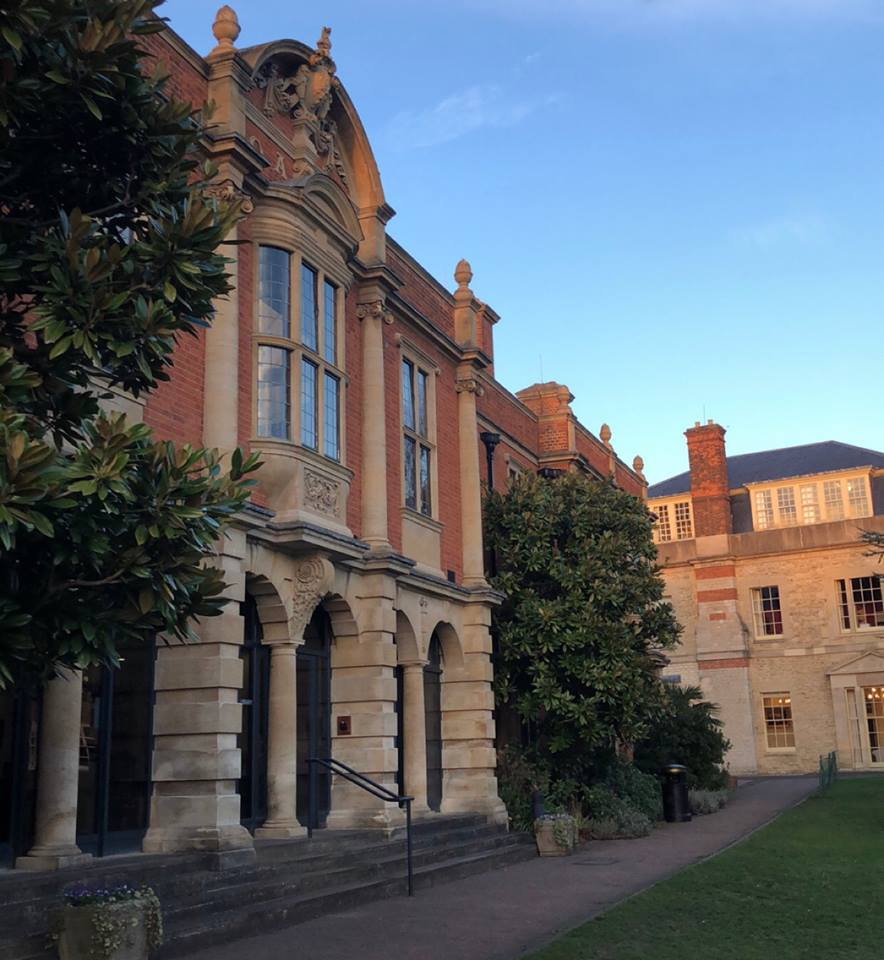
Somerville College Library

The Grade II-listed library designed by Basil Champneys in 1903 was opened by John Morley the following year. Specially for the opening, Demeter was written by Robert Bridges and performed for the first time. Somerville Library was the first purpose-built library in the women's colleges of the university. With some foresight it was designed to contain 60,000 volumes, although the college only possessed 6,000 when it opened. It now holds around 120,000 items (95,000 on open shelves), as one of the largest college libraries in the university.

Amelia Edwards, John Stuart Mill, John Ruskin and Vera Brittain have been notable benefactors to the library. It contains paintings by Mary Somerville, John Constable, Maud Sumner and Patrick George.

The John Stuart Mill room contains what was Mill's personal library in London at the time of his death, with annotations in many of the books.

The library dominates the north wing of the main quadrangle, having been designed to bring the college together, and is open 24 hours, with access to college-wide wifi, a group study room, and computing and printing facilities. It gives full satisfaction according to several annual student surveys.

=== Hall and Maitland ===
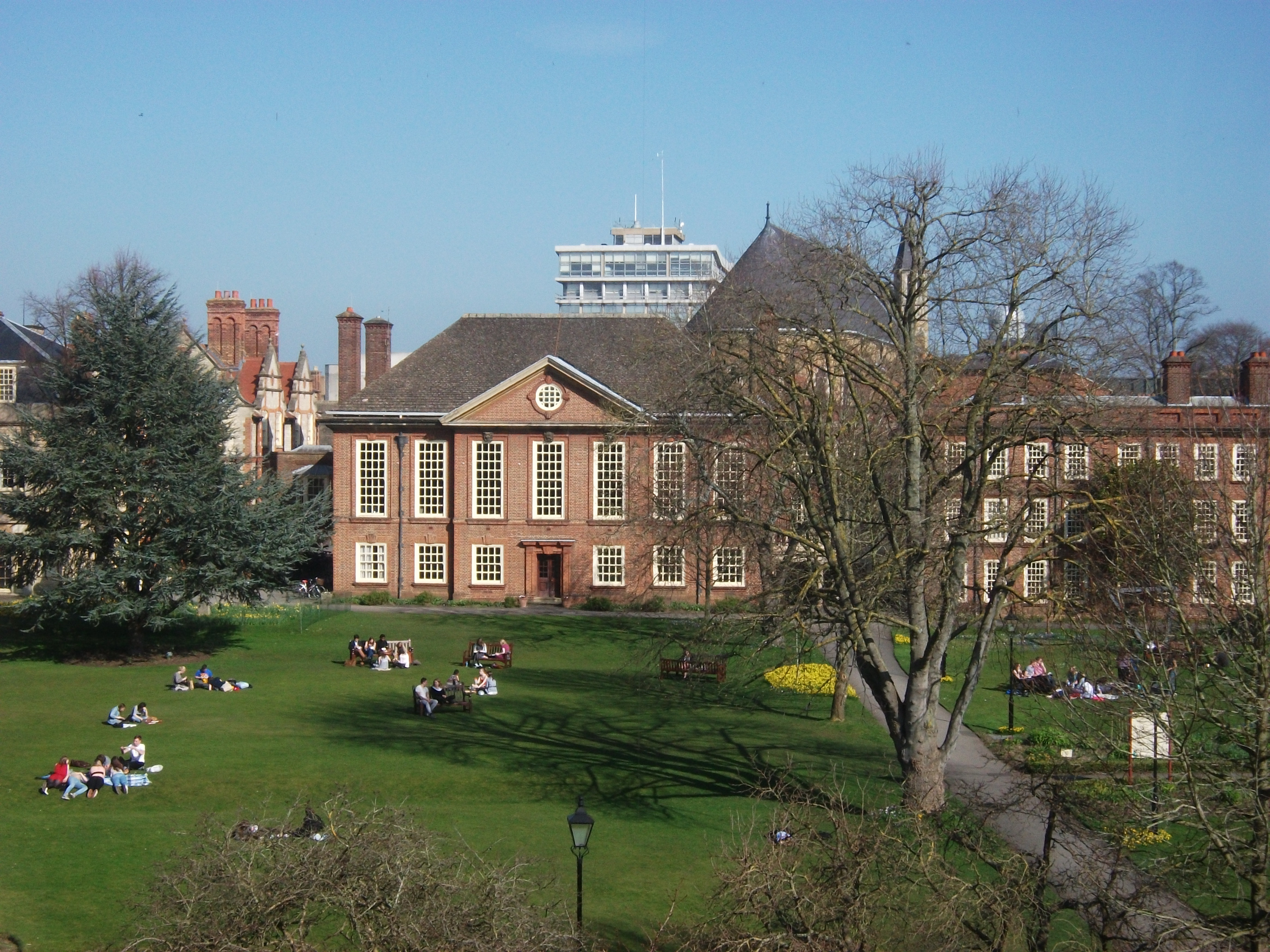
View of Hall and Maitland (right) from the quad

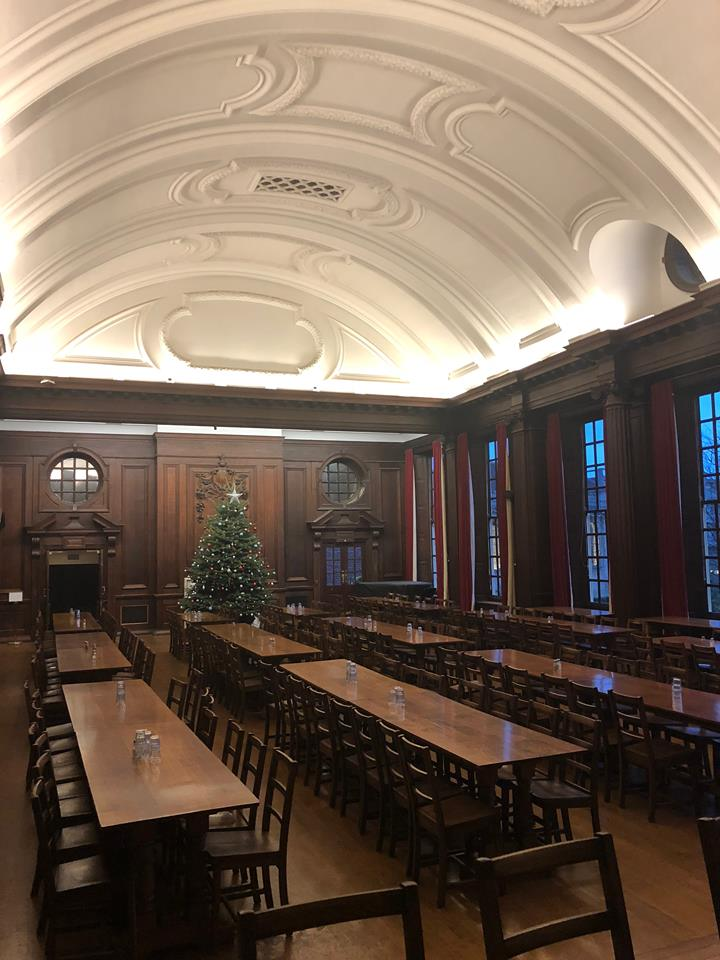
Hall

There was no hall large enough to seat the entire college until 1911, when Maitland Hall and Maitland, designed by Edmund Fisher in Queen Anne style and Edwardian Baroque, were opened by H. A. L. Fisher, the Vice-Chancellor of the university and Gilbert Murray. Murray, whose translations of Greek drama were performed at Somerville in 1912 and 1946, supported Somerville in many ways, including endowing its first research fellowship. A fund was raised as a memorial to Miss Maitland, Principal of Somerville Hall (College from 1894) from 1889 to 1906, and the money was used to pay for oak panelling in Hall. The panelling of the south wall was designed to frame a portrait of Mary Somerville by John Jackson. The buildings were constructed on the site of an adjoining building gifted to Somerville by E. J. Forester in 1897 and bought from University and Balliol Colleges for £4,000 and £1,400 respectively. There was difficulty in constructing the buildings, now thought to have resulted from the outer limit of the Oxford city fortifications running under the site. In 1935, Morley Horder reconstructed the archway connecting Maitland Hall and the south wing of Walton House, creating a Reading Room off the main hall; in 1947, André Gide gave a lecture that filled both these rooms and the staircase and quadrangle outside.

Somerville's is the one Oxford dining hall where all portraits show women. They were painted by Michael Noakes, Herbert James Gunn, George Percy Jacomb-Hood, William Coldstream, John Whittall, Francis Helps, Claude Rogers, Humphrey Ocean, Thomas Leveritt, Richard Twose, and Tania Rivilis.

Hall and Maitland form the east face of the main quad, as Grade II-listed buildings. The Senior Common Room is situated on the ground floor. The first floor holds the pantry and the hall, in which Formal Hall (called guest night) is held weekly in term time.

Maitland now houses few students, being mainly occupied by fellows' offices. The building, named after former Principal Agnes Maitland, stands to the south of Hall.

=== Penrose ===
The Penrose block was designed by Harold Rogers in 1925 and its first students were installed in 1927. A row of poplars had to be removed in 1926 to construct the south-western end of the main quadrangle on the site of 119 and 119A Walton Street. It was refurbished in 2014, with carpets replacing the bare wooden floorboards, and new furniture. Penrose is named after Dame Emily Penrose, third Principal of the college. It contains mainly first-year accommodation in about 30 rooms.

=== Darbishire ===
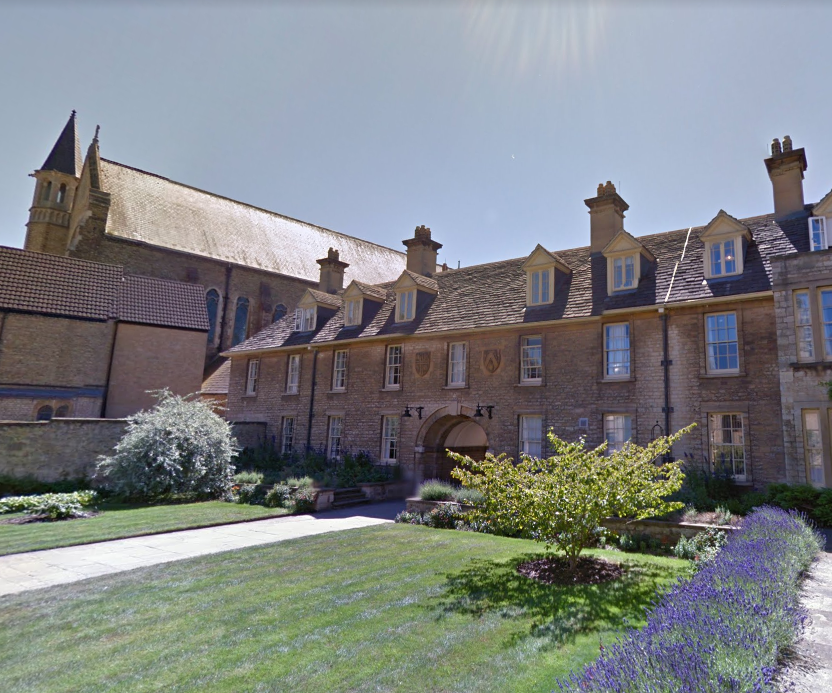
Darbishire Quad

Darbishire Quad was the culmination of a long-standing project to absorb Woodstock Road properties above the Oxford Oratory. In 1920, three houses (29, 31 and 33) were bought by the college from the vicar of St Giles' Church, Oxford for £1,300. The three had been constructed in 1859 and rented by the college before the purchase. The adjoining Waggon and Horses pub was purchased from St John's College in 1923. These buildings were demolished in 1932–1933 together with the old Gate House.

Morley Horder was commissioned to build a quadrangle that would fill the space left by the demolished structures, using a loan of £12,000 from Christ Church. The porters' lodge and New Council Room were constructed at the entrance to the quad, which housed undergraduates and fellows. The coat of arms of Somerville and of co-founder John Percival, first Principal Madeleine Shaw-Lefevre and Helen Darbishire were carved by Edmund Ware inside the quadrangle. The archway leading to Hall was added in 1938.

Originally the East Quadrangle, it was opened in June 1934 by Lord Halifax as "a notable addition to buildings of varying styles" (varii generis aedificiia additamentum nobile) in the Creweian Oration during the Encaenia. Darbishire was renamed in 1962 in honour of the principal of the college during its construction, Helen Darbishire.

Today Darbishire contains some 50 student rooms, along with tutors' offices, the college archive and a medical room. The offices of the Global Ocean Commission, co-chaired by José María Figueres, Trevor Manuel and David Miliband, were housed in Darbishire as part of a partnership with Somerville in 2012–2016, when the organisation completed its work.

Darbishire Quad is described on the opening page of Gaudy Night by alumna Dorothy L. Sayers. The clock was donated by alumna Eleanor Rathbone.

=== Chapel ===
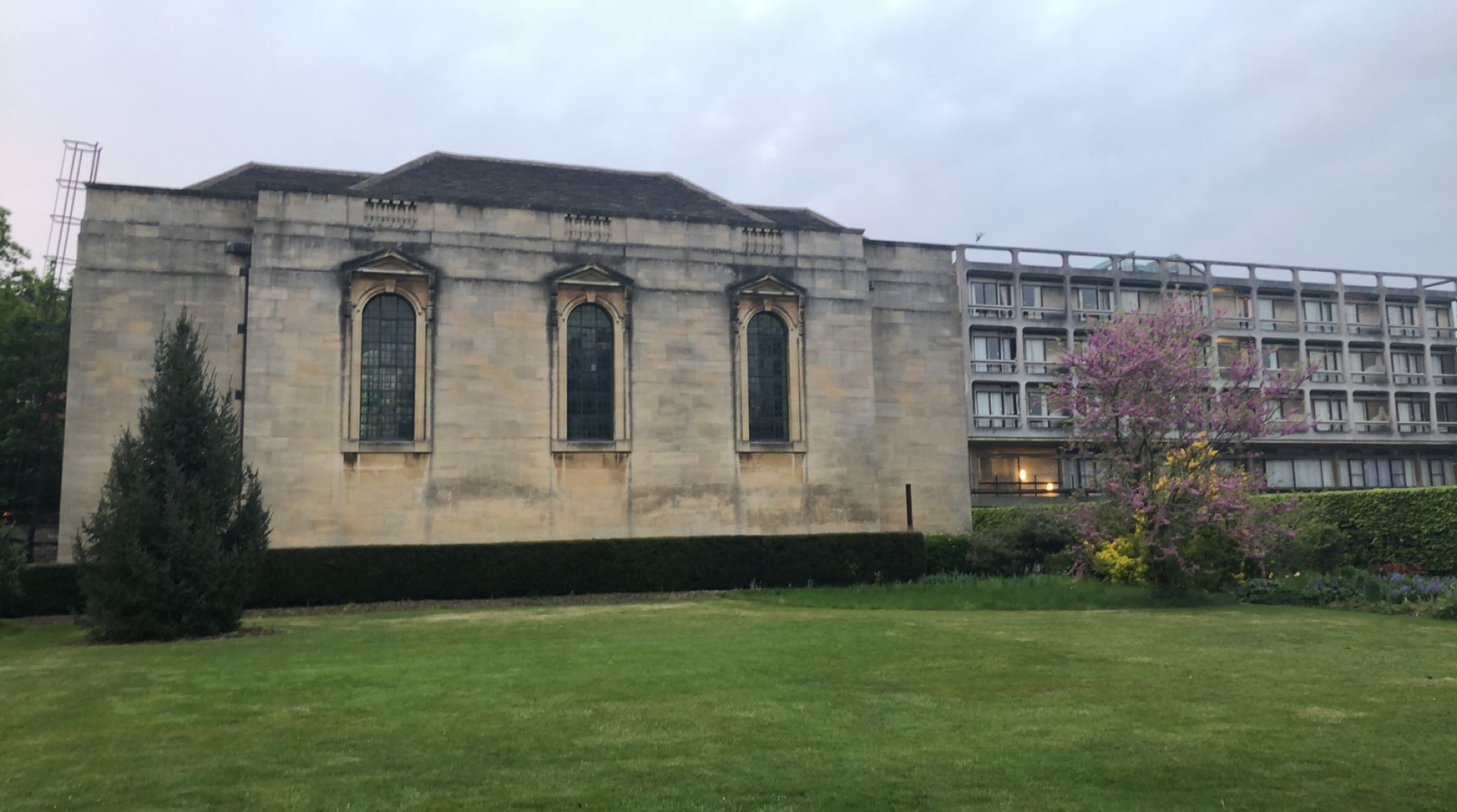
Somerville College Chapel with Vaughan on the right

Built largely with funds provided by alumna Emily Georgiana Kemp in 1935, Somerville Chapel reflects the non-denominational principle on which the college was founded in 1879. No religious tests were used for admission and non-denominational Christian prayers were said in college.

Instead of a chaplain, there is a "Chapel Director", in keeping with its non-denominational tradition. The chapel provides opportunities for Christian worship in addition to hosting speakers with a multiple range of religious perspectives. It holds an excellent mixed-voice Choir of Somerville College, which tours and issues occasional recordings.

=== Hostel and Holtby ===
Hostel is a small block between House and Darbishire completed in 1950 by Geddes Hyslop. It houses 10 students on three floors. The Bursary is on the ground floor.

Holtby, designed in 1951 and completed in 1956 by Hyslop, lies above the library extension, adjacent to Park. It has ten rooms for undergraduates and is named after the alumna Winifred Holtby.

=== Vaughan and Margery Fry & Elizabeth Nuffield House ===
Designed by Sir Philip Dowson between 1958 and 1966, Vaughan and Margery Fry & Elizabeth Nuffield House (commonly shortened to Margery Fry) are both named for former principals of the college, while Elizabeth Nuffield was an important proponent of women's education and along with her husband Lord Nuffield, a financial benefactor of the college. Margery Fry was opened in 1964 by Vijaya Lakshmi Pandit and Vaughan in 1966. Constructed in the same architectural style, with an exterior concrete frame standing away from the walls of the interior edifice, the two buildings overlie a podium of shops and an arcaded walkway in Little Clarendon Street.

Vaughan is the larger of the two, with eleven rows to its concrete frame compared to eight. It is Grade II-listed and contains some 60 undergraduate rooms, smaller than those of Margery Fry and used exclusively for first-year students, along with the junior deans. Vaughan was refurbished in 2013, with new bathroom facilities, including, for the first time, sinks. Beneath the two buildings, a tunnel provides access to Somerville from Little Clarendon Street.

Margery Fry serves as the centre of the postgraduate student community at Somerville, with 24 graduate rooms. Other accommodation for graduate students is provided in buildings adjacent to the college.

=== Wolfson ===
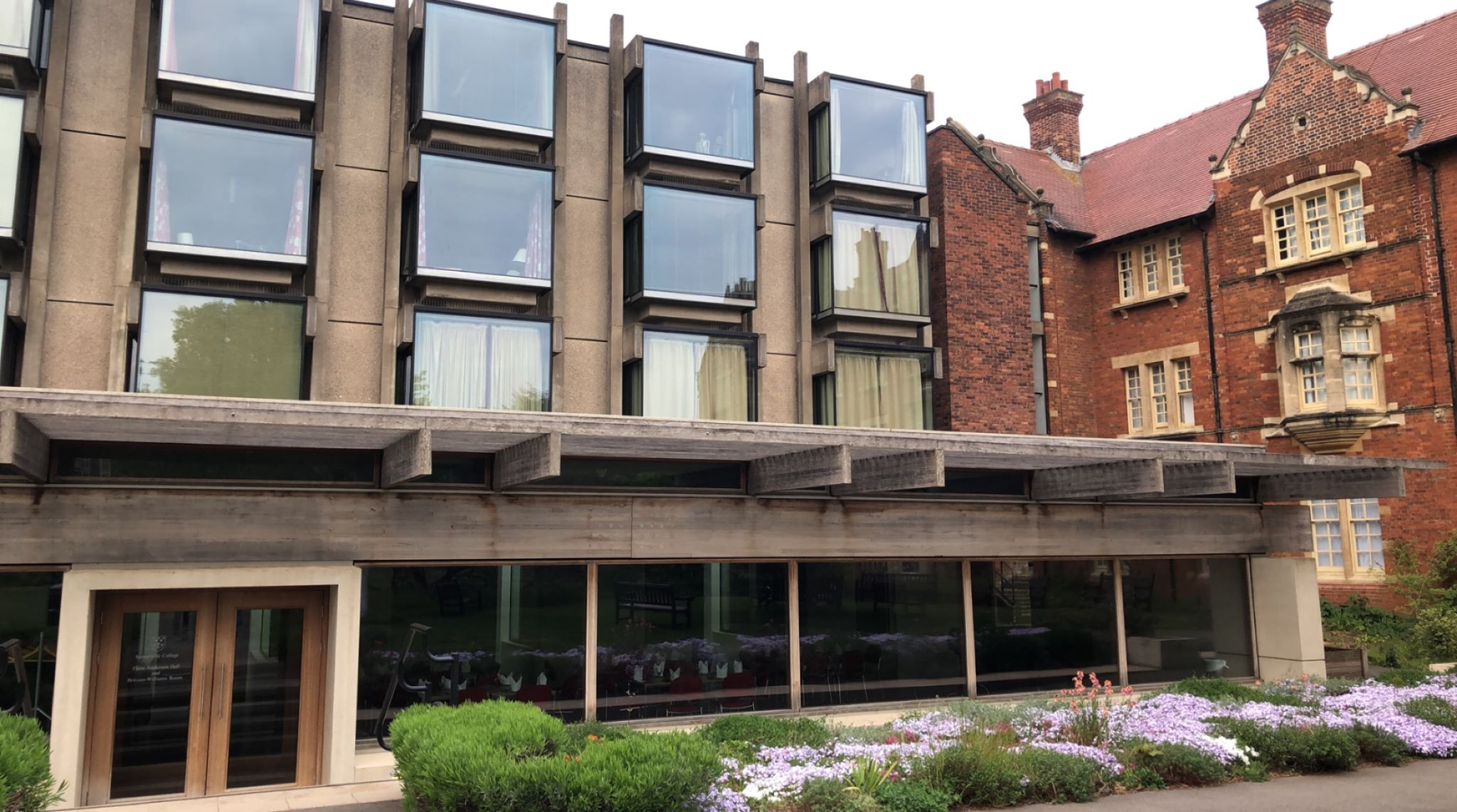
Wolfson building

Sir Philip Dowson was commissioned to design a building at the back of the college to house undergraduates and offices for fellows and Wolfson. Like his other work in Somerville, it is constructed largely of glass and concrete; it is also Grade II listed. A four-storey building with five bays on each floor, Wolfson has impressive views of Walton Street from the rear and Somerville's main quadrangle from the front. Wolfson is named after the building's main benefactor, Sir Isaac Wolfson, and was opened in 1967 by Principal Barbara Craig, with Harold Macmillan, Dorothy Hodgkin and Lord Wolfson giving speeches.

The ground floor contains the Flora Anderson Hall (FAH) and Brittain-Williams Room, named after Vera Brittain and Shirley Williams, the college's most famous mother-daughter alumnae. The room was designed in 2012 by the architect Niall McLaughlin and opened on 29 November 2013 by Williams at an event that included her unveiling a portrait of herself, which now hangs in the room. The FAH is used for lectures and events, notably college parties (or bops) and mock exams, known as Collections.

=== Margaret Thatcher Centre and Dorothy Hodgkin Quadrangle ===
Named after the alumna-Prime Minister, the MTC comprises a lecture room, ante room and lobby used for meetings, conferences and other internal college events. The lecture room has full AV facilities and for 60 seated patrons. A bust of Margaret Thatcher stands in the lobby and the meeting room has portraits of Somerville's two prime-minister alumnae: of Margaret Thatcher by Michael Noakes and Indira Gandhi by Sanjay Bhattacharyya.

The Dorothy Hodgkin Quad (DHQ) was conceived in 1985, completed in 1991 and named after Somerville's Nobel Prize-winner. The quadrangle is above the MTC and designed around self-contained flats of two and four bedrooms with communal kitchens, housing mainly finalists and some second-year students.

Architect Geoffrey Beard's scheme was submitted to Oxford City Council in 1986 and the energies of Sir Geoffrey Leigh and alumna and former principal Baroness Daphne Park brought support from around the world. The buildings were opened in 1991 by Margaret Thatcher, Dorothy Hodgkin, Principal Catherine Hughes and College Visitor Baron Roy Jenkins.

=== St Paul's Nursery ===
Somerville College was the first Oxford college to provide a nursery for children of Fellows and staff and is still one of the few colleges to do so. Alumna Dorothy Hodgkin donated much of her Nobel Prize money to the project. St Paul's Nursery is also open to families unconnected with the college and cares for 16 children between the ages of three months and five years.

=== Radcliffe Observatory Quarter ===
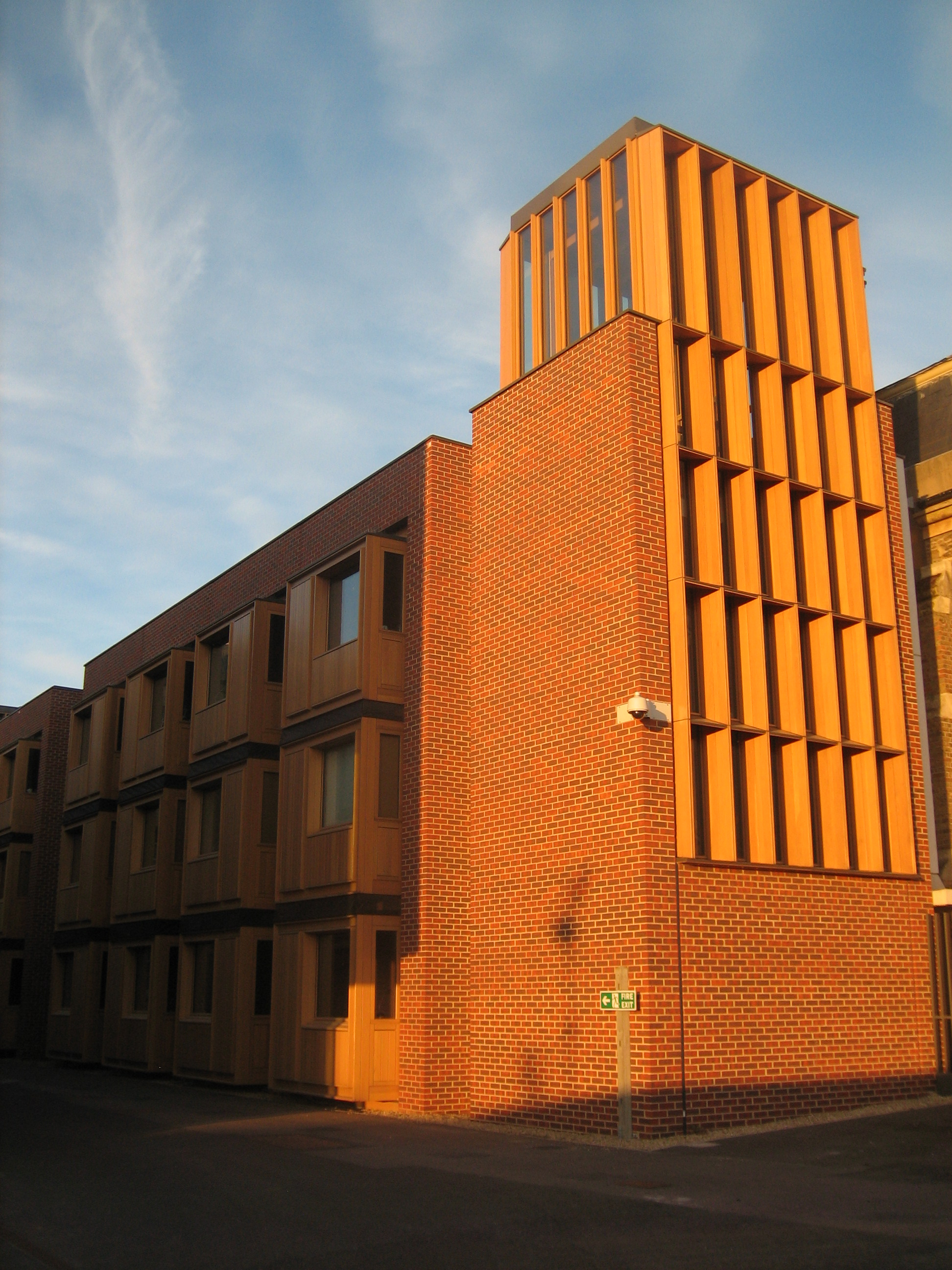
ROQ East from outside the college

ROQ East and West flank the north side of Somerville and overlook the site of the university's new Blavatnik School of Government and Mathematical Institute. Completed in 2011, they were the first new buildings in the university's Radcliffe Observatory Quarter and have won four awards for their architect Niall McLaughlin. The project was also awarded Oxford City Council's David Steel Sustainable Building Award, being commended for balancing Somerville's collegiate heritage with the need for energy efficiency. Energy-efficiency measures include renewable technologies such as solar thermal energy and ground source heat pumps.

The buildings house 68 students in en-suite rooms. There are several rooms and facilities designed to help those with disabilities, including lifts and adjoining carer rooms. The buildings were funded by donations of over £2.7 million from over 1,000 alumni and friends of the college and by a significant loan. There is now an unimpeded view of the Radcliffe Observatory.

=== The Terrace ===
The bar and café of the college, The Terrace, opened in 2013 (replacing the old bar in House) and is attached to the Vaughan building. It is housed in a mainly glass structure, with seating in the college colours of red and black. It has an open-air terrace looking down on Little Clarendon Street. The Terrace has the usual pool table and bar facilities and serves the college drink, "Stone-cold Jane Austen", consisting of blue VK, Southern Comfort, and Magners cider, as well as the "College Triple" and the non-alcoholic "Somerville Sunset".

=== Catherine Hughes Building ===
Named after Somerville's late principal in 1989–1996, the Catherine Hughes Building was completed in October 2019 and provides 68 additional bedrooms. Designed by Niall McLaughlin Architects, it includes en suite bathrooms, kitchens and accessible rooms on every floor and a new communal study area for graduate students.

The red-brick building has a frontage onto Walton Street and additional access from the college gardens, aligning with key levels on the adjacent Penrose Building. The bedrooms are arranged in clusters with kitchens and circulation spaces forming social focal points.

The building's construction has given Somerville sufficient accommodation to be one of three Oxford colleges which can allow all students applying from 2017 to live in college for the entirety of their three or four-year undergraduate degree courses.

=== Gardens ===
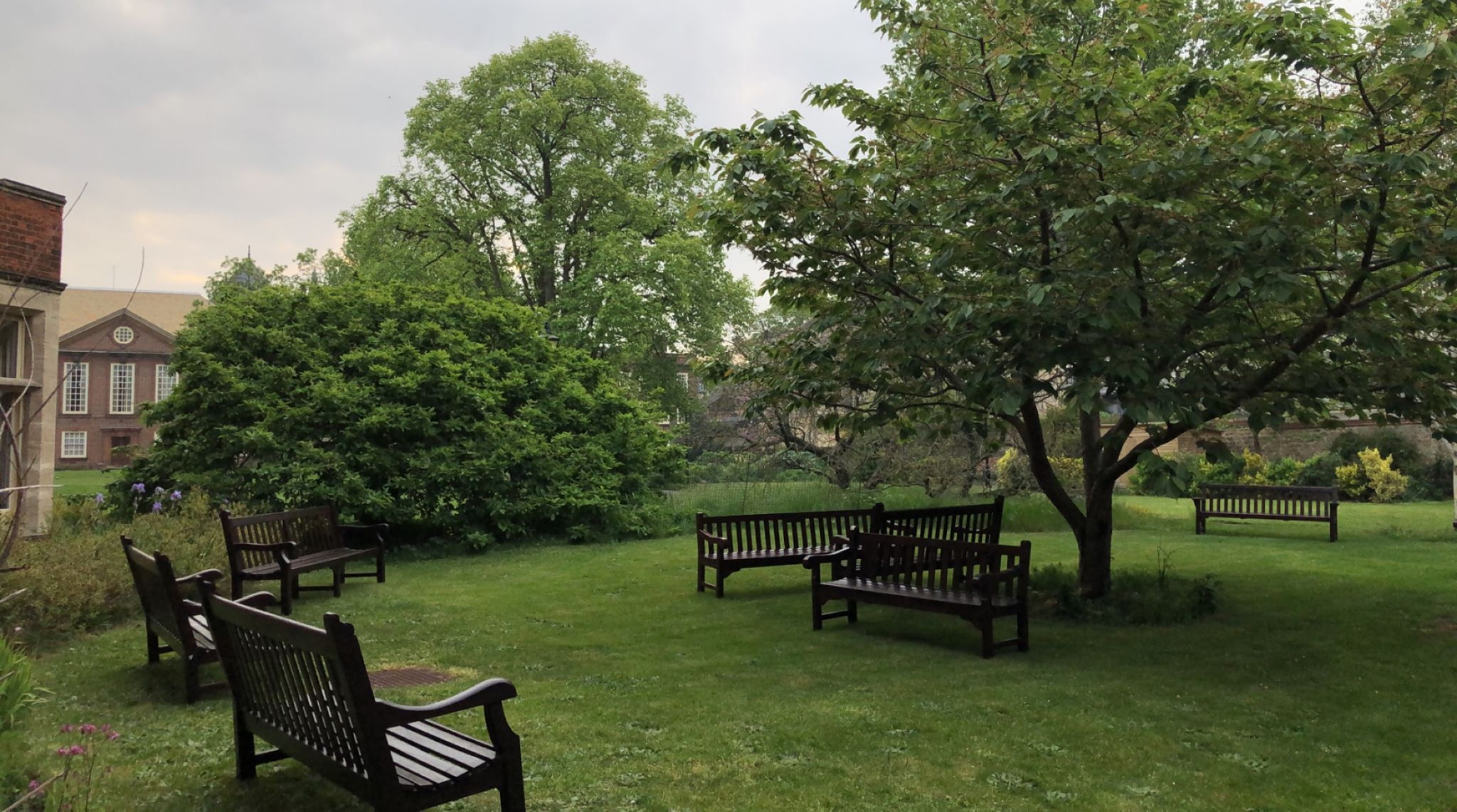

Somerville is one of few Oxford colleges where students may walk on the grass. An unassuming frontage opens onto a vast green space looked after by two gardeners. The original site consisted of a paddock, an orchard and a vegetable garden and was bounded by large trees. It was home to a donkey, two cows, a pony and a pig. The paddock was soon transformed into tennis courts, where huge tents were erected during World War I. During World War II, large water tanks were dug in the Main Quad and in Darbishire Quad in case of firebombing, and the lawns dug up and planted with vegetables.

In the Main or Library Quad there is a cedar planted by Harold Macmillan in 1976, after an earlier cedar fell victim to a winter storm. Another tree, a Picea likiangensis (var. rubescens), was planted in 2007 on the chapel lawn, providing Somerville with an outdoor Christmas tree. The library border of lavender and Agapanthus references the bluestocking reputation of Somerville. The tory blue Ceratostigma willmottianum stands outside the Margaret Thatcher Centre. The garden outside the Thatcher Centre, now dedicated to Lisa Minoprio, was originally designed by the former director of the Oxford Botanic Garden and Lecturer in Plant Sciences Timothy Walker, and retains yellow and blue as its theme colours.

There are nods to Somerville's long-standing links with India, the most notable being a large specimen of the Indian horse chestnut, Aesculus indica, planted on the Library lawn in 2019. Features of interest include a narrow bed of low-growing Mediterranean plants in front of Wolfson in a modernist style, a varied selection of mature trees in the Library Quad, and large herbaceous borders containing emblematic Somerville thistles (Echinops).

The annual summer and winter bedding plants in Darbishire Quad, the beds outside the SCR, and those in pots around site have traditionally been in the Victorian style, to reflect the era of inception of the college. However, this is evolving due to a change in garden management in late 2019, with aims of following more environmentally friendly growing principles and developing a more contemporary style. The western wall of Penrose and the northern wall of Vaughan form a secluded area, historically known as the Fellows' Garden (currently in a transitional phase). It is distinct from the main quad and separated from it by a hedge and a wall, and which were previously kitchen gardens. This walled garden is home to a sundial, commissioned in 1926 and commemorating first principal Madeleine Shaw-Lefevre, and a garden roller gifted by the parents of tutor Rose Sidgwick.

In 1962, Henry Moore lent his work Falling Warrior to the college and Barbara Hepworth lent Core shortly afterwards. There are also permanent sculptures by Wendy Taylor, Friedrich Werthmann and Somervillian Polly Ionides. The most striking sculpture on site is Taylor's Triad (1971), situated on the Chapel Lawn in front of Maitland building.

== Student life ==
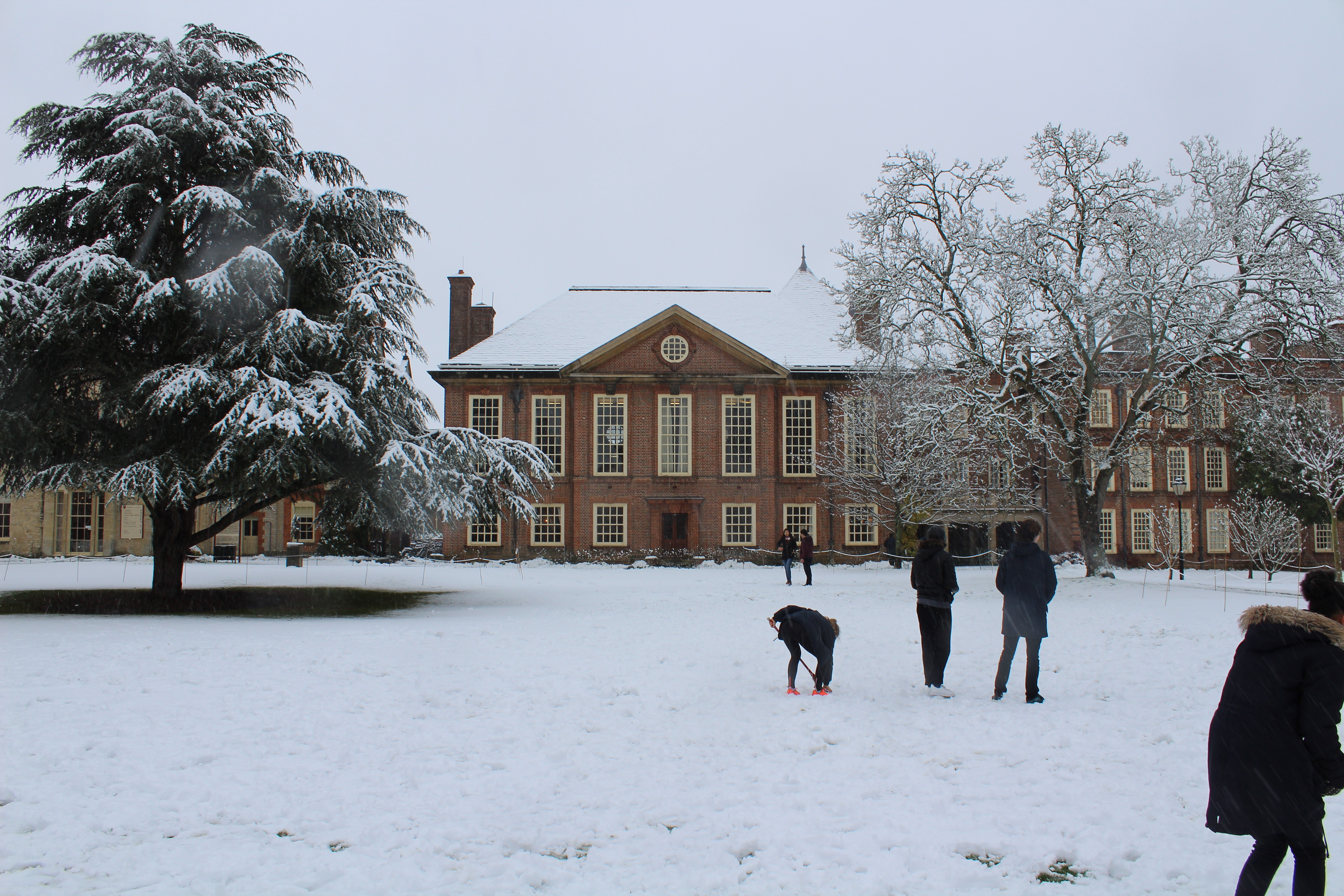
Somerville College in snow

In 2011 student satisfaction was rated in some categories as the highest in the university. Central to it is its large quad, onto which most accommodation blocks back; it is often filled with students in summer. Somerville is one of the few Oxford colleges where students (as opposed to just fellows) may walk on the grass. Somerville is sometimes nicknamed The Ville. Formal Halls take place on some Tuesdays and Fridays about six times a term. No gowns are worn and the grace is Benedictus benedicat. The college song is Omnes laetae nunc sodales.

=== Sports ===
Somerville has a gym beneath Vaughan with treadmills, cross-trainers and weights. It shares a sports ground with Wadham College and St Hugh's College, in Marston Ferry Road. There are clubs and teams in men's and women's football, rugby (with Corpus Christi), mixed lacrosse, cricket, swimming, hockey, netball, basketball, pool, water polo, tennis, squash, badminton, cycling, golf, rounders, and croquet.

Both the Somerville cricket and netball team won Cuppers for the 2014/15 season. The swimming team won Cuppers for the 2015/16 season.

==== Rowing ====
Rowing blade design of Somerville College Boat Club

Somerville formed a rowing team in 1921. It competes in both of the annual university bumps races, Torpids and Summer Eights. The women are the most successful women's rowing team at the university, having won the title Head of the River eight times in Summer Eights and five times in Torpids. The club shares the award-winning University College Boathouse on The Isis with St Peter's College, University College and Wolfson College.

=== Choir ===
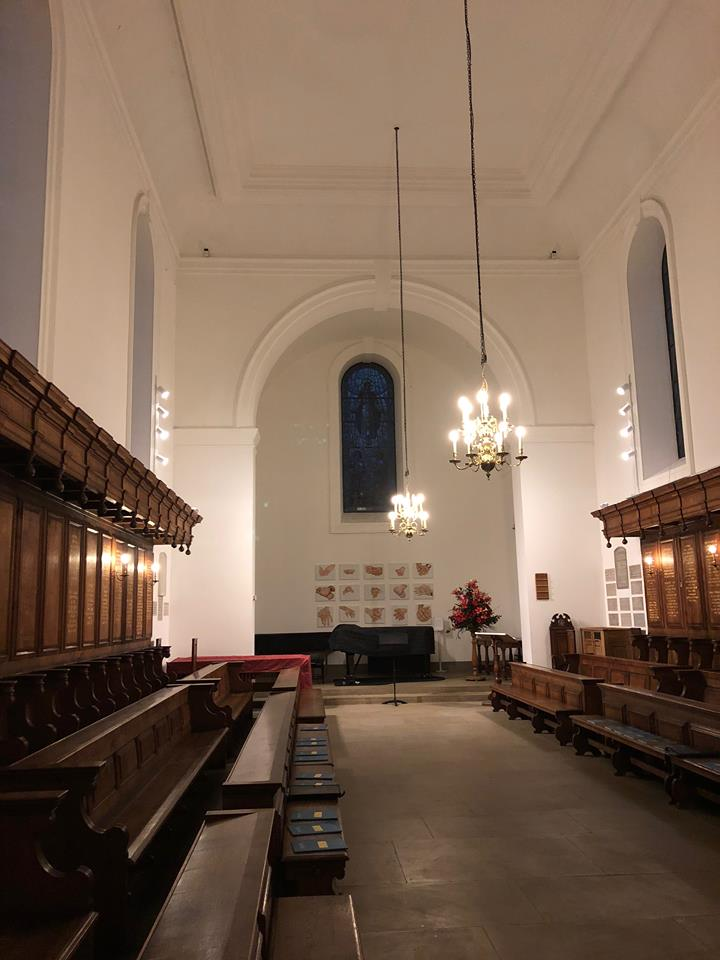
Somerville College Chapel

The Choir of Somerville College is mixed voice and led by the Director of Chapel Music, Will Dawes. In conjunction with the organ scholars, the choir is central to the musical life at the college.

There are regular concerts and cathedral visits, and recitals featuring soloists from the choir. In recent years it has toured Germany (2005 and 2009), Italy (2010) and the United States (2014 and 2016). It sings every term-time Sunday at the evening service. The organ of the college chapel is a traditionally voiced instrument by Harrison & Harrison.

Somerville offers up to eight Choral Exhibitions a year to applicants reading any subject.

The college choir has released two CDs on the Stone Records label, "Requiem Aeternam" (2012) and "Advent Calendar" (2013).

=== Triennial Ball ===
Once every three years, Somerville hosts a ball jointly with Jesus College, Oxford. The last, for over a thousand people, was held in April 2022 and the next ball will come in 2025.

However, the 2013 ball, The Last Ball, was mired in controversy reported in national news. The organisers had intended to display a live nurse shark as entertainment. Permission for the shark was initially granted by the principal Alice Prochaska, but was subsequently revoked following student protests. The ball was widely condemned for poor organisation, examples of which included a lack of canapés and the presence of only one food stand, serving pork; the vegetarian options were said to run out quickly and revellers were reportedly set on fire by the pork rôtisserie. The Guardian reported "The ball descended into farce with guests questioning what the organisers had done with the money paid by 1,000 guests."

=== Academic reputation ===
Somerville's Position in the Norrington Table since 2006

Before men were admitted Somerville, under the principalship of Barbara Craig, established a position at or near the head of the Norrington Table. More recently, Somerville was in the lower half of the university's colleges for academic achievement. For the academic year 2018/19, it came 21st out of 30 in the Norrington Table, which listed the university's undergraduate colleges in order of their students' examination performances. However, in 2021/22, after which the Norrington Table was discontinued, Somerville scored 76.4% and was ranked 9th on the Table, marking a considerable improvement from its previous scores. The college has been recognised as a University College of Sanctuary by the UK charity City of Sanctuary, and offers a fully-funded postgraduate Sanctuary scholarship.

=== University Challenge ===
Somerville has had recent success disproportionate to its size on the TV quiz show University Challenge. It won the competition once, triumphing in the University Challenge 2001–02 series by beating Imperial College, London by 200 points to 185. Croatian quizzer Dorjana Širola was one of the contestants. Recently the college team reached the final of the University Challenge 2013–14 series, losing in the final to Trinity College, Cambridge, with a score of 135 to 240.

== India ==
Somerville College plays a major role in relations between Oxford and India. Cornelia Sorabji, born in the Bombay Presidency of British India, became the first Indian woman to study at any British university, when she came to Somerville in 1889 to read law, while Indira Gandhi, India's first female prime minister, read Modern History at the college in 1937. Radhabai Subbarayan, the first woman member of the Indian Council of States (Rajya Sabha) studied at Somerville College as well, as did princess Bamba Sutherland, the last surviving member of a family that had ruled the Sikh Empire in the Punjab, and her sister Catherine Hilda Duleep Singh. Other alumni with links to India include Moon Moon Sen, Agnes de Selincourt, Smit Singh, Gurmehar Kaur, Hilda Stewart Reid and Utsa Patnaik. Former principal of Somerville College Barbara Craig from 1967 to 1980 and fellow Aditi Lahiri were born in Kolkata.

Sonia Gandhi visited Somerville in 2002 and presented a portrait of her late mother-in-law to her alma mater. Indira Gandhi received an honorary degree from the college in 1971.

In 2012, under Principal Alice Prochaska, the college and Oxford University announced a £19 million Indira Gandhi Centre for Sustainable Development. India provided £3 million and the university and college £5.5 million. The name was later changed to the Oxford India Centre for Sustainable Development (OICSD). The OICSD carries out research on sustainable development challenges facing India and provides scholarships for outstanding Indian students. As of 2018, the centre hosted 12 India scholars, which has since increased and in 2022, there were a total of 19 scholars. A new building is planned in the Radcliffe Observatory Quarter, adjacent to the college's ROQ accommodation.

Somerville's choir was in 2018 the first Oxford college choir to tour India. In December 2023, they did another (three-city) tour of India, along with representatives from the OICSD, to celebrate the 10th anniversary of the sustainability partnership with the country. Earlier the same year, a new scholarship for Indian students from underrepresented backgrounds was also launched.

In 2024, following the death of Ratan Tata, the chairman of Tata Group and Tata Sons from 1991 to 2012, and Honorary Patron of the Oxford India Centre for Sustainable Development, it was announced that the Group and Somerville had planned a collaboration to construct the Ratan Tata Building in his honour. On the 23rd of September, 2025, a ground-breaking ceremony for the new building which "will serve as a permanent home" for the OICSD, and designed by the London- and Copenhagen-based Morris & Co., was officiated by Catherine Royle, Somerville's newly-appointed Principal.

Also in 2024, following a collaboration between the OICSD and the Piramal family, Somerville launched a scholarship honouring Dr Gita Piramal, a prominent business historian, and one of their Senior Associate Fellows. The scholarship was set to run for an initial five years.

== People associated with Somerville ==
=== Alumni ===
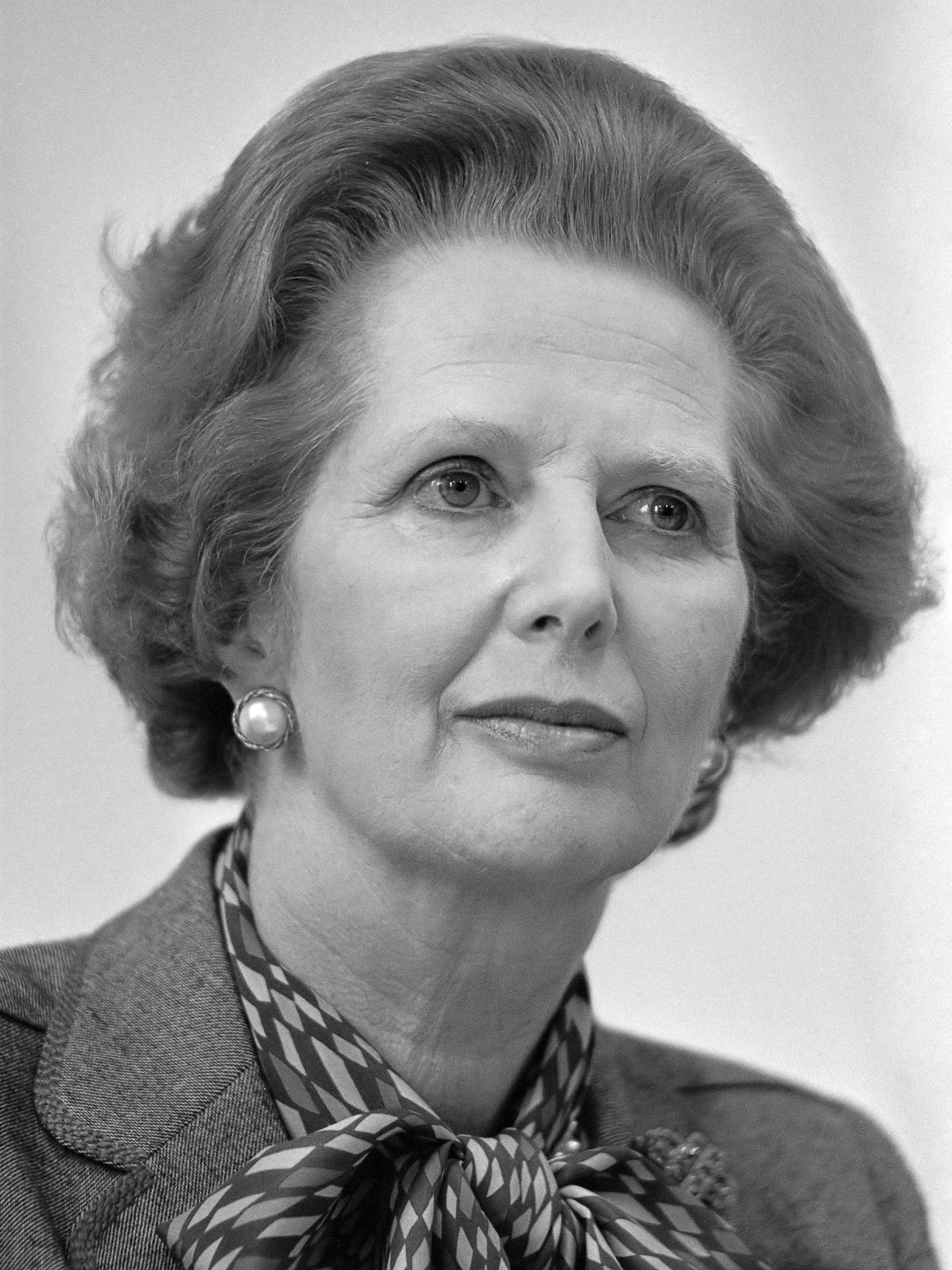
Margaret Thatcher, Prime Minister of the United Kingdom (1979–1990)

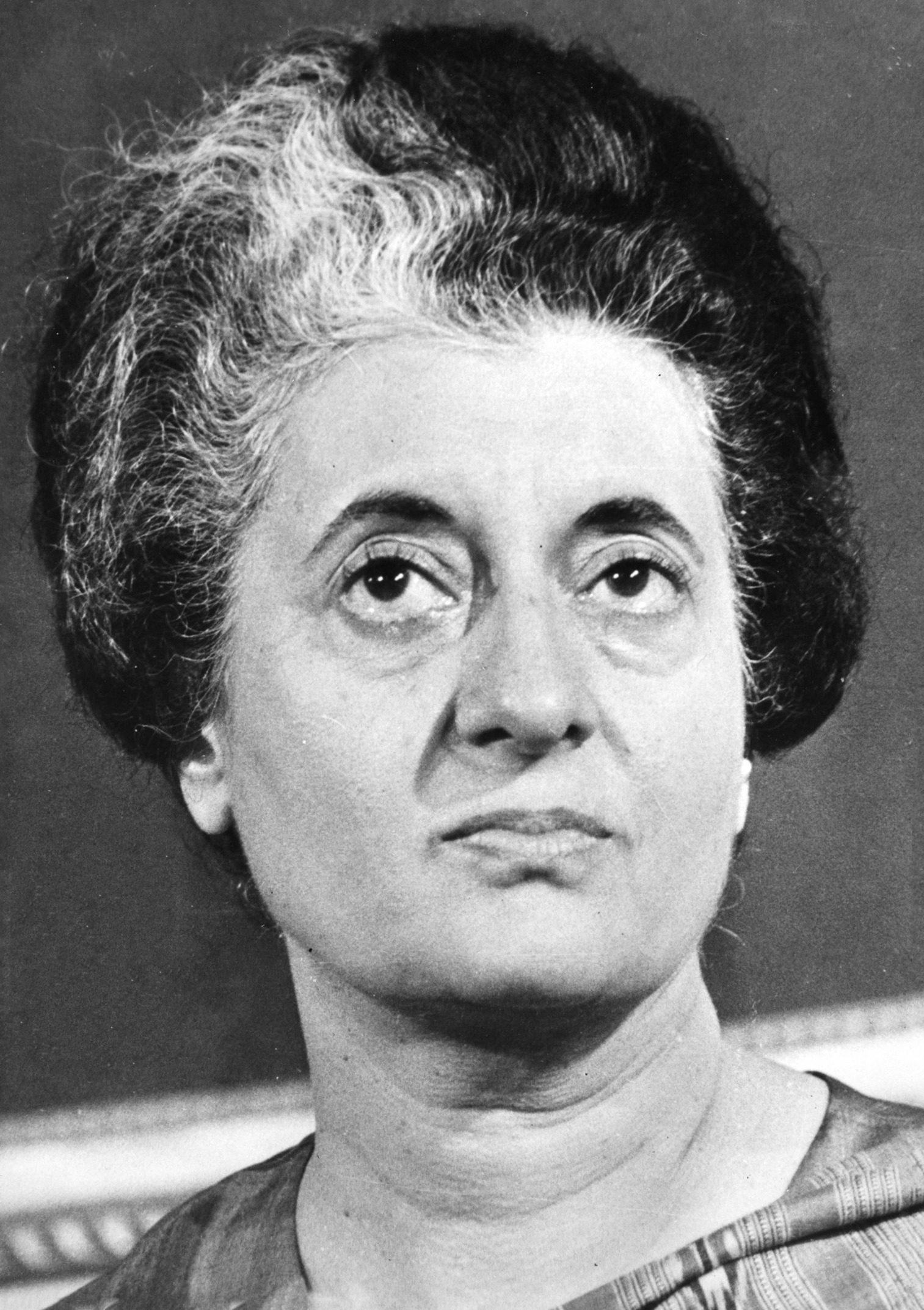
Indira Gandhi, Prime Minister of India (1966–1977 and 1980–1984)

Somervillians include Prime Ministers Margaret Thatcher and Indira Gandhi, Nobel Prize winning scientist Dorothy Hodgkin, television personalities Esther Rantzen and Susie Dent, reformer Cornelia Sorabji, writers Marjorie Boulton, A. S. Byatt, Vera Brittain, Susan Cooper, Penelope Fitzgerald, Winifred Holtby, Nicole Krauss, Iris Murdoch and Dorothy L. Sayers, politicians Lucy Powell, Shirley Williams, Thérèse Coffey, Margaret Jay and Sam Gyimah, Princess Bamba Sutherland and her sister, biologist Marian Dawkins, philosophers G. E. M. Anscombe, Patricia Churchland, Philippa Foot and Mary Midgley, psychologist Anne Treisman, archaeologist Kathleen Kenyon, actress Moon Moon Sen, soprano Emma Kirkby, banker Baroness Vadera and numerous (women's rights) activists.

Somerville alumnae have achieved an impressive number of "firsts", both (inter)nationally and at the University of Oxford. Arguably the most prominent of these are: the first woman Prime Minister of the United Kingdom Margaret Thatcher; the first, and only, British woman to win a Nobel Prize in science Dorothy Hodgkin and the first woman to lead the world's largest democracy Indira Gandhi, who was Prime Minister of India for much of the 1970s.

Somervillians include at least 30 Dames, 18 heads of Oxford colleges, 12 MP's, 15 life peers, four Olympic rowers, three of The 50 greatest British writers since 1945, two prime ministers, two princesses, a queen consort, a first lady, and a Nobel laureate (plus three nominees).

Former students of Somerville belong to an alumni group, the Somerville Association, which was originally founded in 1888.

=== Fellows ===
Notable fellows of Somerville College (excluding alumni) include philosopher G. E. M. Anscombe, biochemist Louise Johnson, classical archaeologist Margarete Bieber, Egyptologist Käthe Bosse-Griffiths, classicists Edith Hall and Lotte Labowsky, author Alan Hollinghurst, astronomer Chris Lintott, International Federation of University Women founder Rose Sidgwick, botanist Timothy Walker and philologist Anna Morpurgo Davies.

=== Principals ===
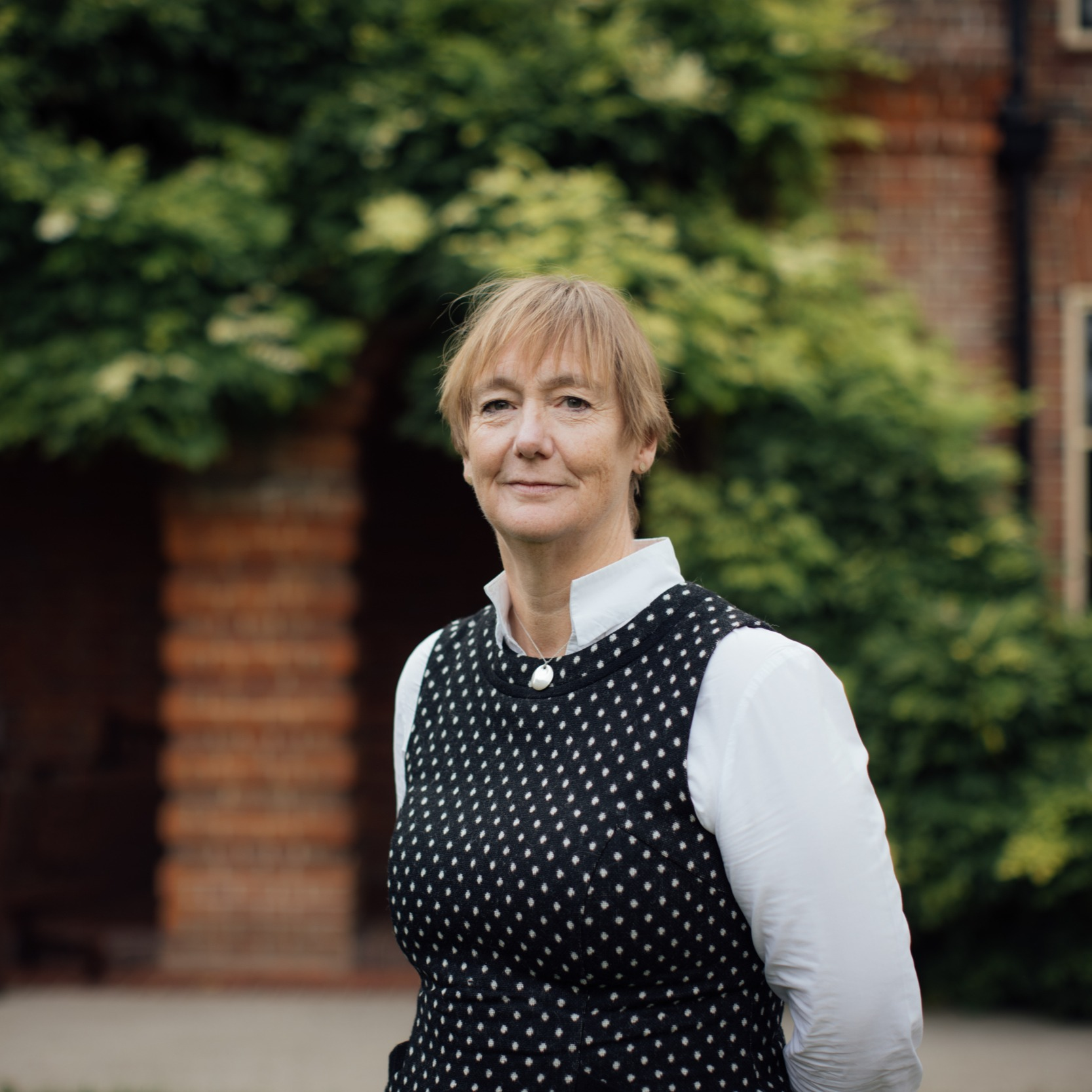
Catherine Royle, September 2025

The first principal of Somerville Hall was Madeleine Shaw-Lefèvre (1879–1889). The first principal of Somerville College was Agnes Catherine Maitland (1889–1906), when in 1894 it became the first of the five women's halls to adopt the title of college, the first to appoint its own teaching staff, the first to set an entrance examination, and the first to build a library. She was succeeded by the classical scholar Emily Penrose (1906–1926), who set up in 1903 the Mary Somerville Research Fellowship offering women in Oxford opportunities for research.

The current principal is the former British ambassador and Political Advisor at NATO, Catherine Royle, who took up the appointment in October 2025, succeeding Janet Royall, Baroness Royall of Blaisdon. To date, eight principals have been alumnae of Somerville, including Catherine Royle and historian Alice Prochaska (principal 2010-2017), with an additional two being alumni of St Hilda's College.

== Coat of arms and motto ==
Like all Oxford colleges, Somerville has a variety of symbols and colours which are associated with it. The college's colours, which feature on the college scarf and on the blades of its boats, are red and black. The combination was originally adopted in the 1890s. Its flag has the shield from the arms on a yellow background.

The two colours also feature in the college's coat of arms, which depicts three mullets in chevron reversed gules, between six crosses crosslet fitched sable. The college's motto, Donec rursus impleat orbem, was originally that of the family of Mary Somerville. Her family befriended the new hall, allowing it to adopt their arms and motto. The Latin motto itself is described as "baffling" as, although it translates as "Until It Should Fill the World Again", the subject of the sentence ("it") is left unspecified. The crest, which is often omitted, is a hand grasping a crescent and occasionally a helmet with mantling is added.

== In popular culture ==
- The mystery novel Gaudy Night by Dorothy L. Sayers featuring Lord Peter Wimsey is set in Shrewsbury College, which is a thinly veiled take on Sayers' own Somerville College (although in a different location).
- In the 2014 film The Amazing Spider-Man 2 directed by Marc Webb, one of the protagonists, Gwen Stacy, is offered a place to study medicine at Somerville. Its coat of arms is featured in one scene.
- The 2014 biopic Testament of Youth, based on Brittain's memoir of the same name, substituted Merton College, Oxford in the scenes showing Brittain's time as a student at Somerville, arguing that filming in Somerville itself would have been too difficult in light of the new buildings constructed there since the film's time period.
- Somerville is the recognisable model for St Bride's College in Michaelmas Term at St Bride's by Brunette Coleman (Philip Larkin).
- In the film Iris from 2001, telling of alumna Iris Murdoch and her relationship with her husband John Bayley, whom she meets during a dinner at the Somerville.
- Somerville is featured in the BBC series Testament of Youth (1979).
- In the Japanese manga series Master Keaton, the main character married a mathematics student from Somerville.
- St Jerome's College in Endymion Spring by alumnus Matthew Skelton is based on Somerville. The cat Mephistopheles is based on the former college cat Pogo.
- Amory Clay, the main character in Sweet Caress by William Boyd, was encouraged by her teacher to go to Somerville.
- Grace Ritchie, the protagonist in Slave Of The Passion by Deirdre Wilson has gone up to Somerville.
- Helena Warner from A Likeness in Stone by Julia Wallis Martin, was a student of Somerville.
- Eleanor Drummond, the protagonist in Daddy's Girl by Valerie Mendes, went to Somerville.
