= Alice Prochaska =

British archivist (born 1947)

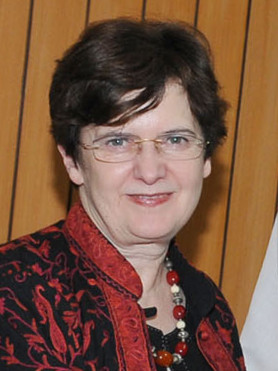
Prochaska in 2012

Alice Prochaska FRHistS (née Barwell; born 12 July 1947) is a British former archivist and librarian, who was Pro-vice-chancellor of the University of Oxford and Principal of Somerville College, Oxford, from 2010 to 2017.

== Career ==
Alice Prochaska studied at Somerville College in the University of Oxford and received BA and DPhil degrees in Modern History.

Prochaska was initially a museum curator, and then an archivist at the Public Record Office, now The National Archives. From 1984 to 1992 she was administrator and deputy director at the Institute of Historical Research, University of London. From 1992 to 2001 she was Director of Special Collections at the British Library. She then became head librarian at Yale University, United States, from 2001 to 2010. She became Principal of Somerville College from 1 September 2010. She was affectionately known as 'Ali P' by the student body. She stepped down at the end of her seven-year term in August 2017.

Prochaska was involved with the design of the first National Curriculum for history in the United Kingdom during 1989–90. She was a governor of London Guildhall University, now part of London Metropolitan University. She chaired the National Council on Archives and was a member of the Royal Commission on Historical Manuscripts. Prochaska is a Fellow of the Royal Historical Society and served as vice-president from 1995 to 1999. In the US she chaired the Center for Research Libraries and several committees of the Association of Research Libraries, served on the board of Yale University Press, and lectured on subjects relating to archives and special collections. During her tenure at Somerville she served as a Pro-Vice-Chancellor of the University of Oxford. She chairs the Sir Winston Churchill Archive Trust. She also lectures and publishes on topics related to national heritage and national identity.

Prochaska is an Honorary Fellow of Somerville College.

== Personal life ==
Alice Prochaska was married to the historian Frank Prochaska (1941–2026).

== Books ==
- (1973) London in the Thirties (exhibition catalogue for the London Museum) ISBN 9780112901709
- (1973) London since 1912 (co-author with John T. Hayes) ISBN 9780112901457
- (1976) Young Writers of the Thirties (exhibition catalogue for the National Portrait Gallery) ISBN 9780904017076
- (1982) History of the General Federation of Trade Unions, 1899–1980 ISBN 9780043310878
- (1986) Irish History from 1700: a guide to sources in the Public Record Office, Archives and the User 6: British Records Association. ISBN 9780900222078
- (1987) Margaretta Acworth's Georgian Cookery Book (co-editor with Frank K. Prochaska) ISBN 9781851451241

Academic offices
Preceded by Fiona Caldicott	Principal of Somerville College, Oxford; 2010–2017	Succeeded by Janet Royall, Baroness Royall of Blaisdon
