= Evangelical chaplains in India =

Evangelical chaplains in India were a significant group of Anglican clergy around the year 1800, employed by the East India Company, especially in the Bengal presidency. They were not missionaries, but ministered to the British population. On the other hand, they tried to facilitate missionary activity in line with their evangelical Christian views.

== Background ==
Christian missionary activity, at this period, opposed the East India Company's wishes, which in general and by tradition were "orientalist": based on respecting local laws, customs and religions. So-called "Company orientalism" is dated to 1772, when the company had revenue collection in Bengal farmed out to it, and adopted a stance of rationalising existing institutions but working with the grain of the local culture. (See also Scottish orientalism.) The company's Charter came up for renewal every 20 years, and in 1793 political moves to modify the "orientalist" line failed. In 1813, however, the company's complete control of missionary activity in its domains was eroded, with an appeal possible.

The evangelical chaplains were closely associated with the Church Missionary Society (CMS) and the early London Missionary Society (LMS). In common with the LMS, they made little of the denominational differences between the Church of England and dissenters such as the Baptists and Methodists.

== Charles Simeon ==
The Cambridge-based evangelical Charles Simeon used his influence to find posts in India for a group of evangelical chaplains, the first of whom was Claudius Buchanan. He arrived in Calcutta in 1797, first lodging with David Brown. Brown's appointment as a presidency chaplain had come in 1794, eight years after his arrival in Bengal. Buchanan spent some months with Brown, before moving to Barrackpore for two years, where he had little to do as a minister. He was appointed to Fort William College, but as a company chaplain was barred from missionary activity. He left India in 1808.

It was not until 1805 that Simeon, with the support of Charles Grant as East India Company director, was able to nominate chaplains who were recognised as evangelists to the Indian population. The phase of evangelical activity condoned in this way by the company was short, however: it came to an end when Brown and Henry Martyn died in 1812.

=== Nominees and followers ===
- Daniel Corrie
- Thomas Dealtry
- Thomas Truebody Thomason
- Marmaduke Thompson (died 1851)

The "five chaplains" is a phrase attributed to John William Kaye, as applying to David Brown, Claudius Buchanan, Henry Martyn, Thomas Thomason, and Daniel Corrie. Kaye in fact mentions this group as "Bengal chaplains" and "Christian heroes".

== Missionary societies ==
The CMS formed a Calcutta branch in 1807. The chaplains Daniel Corrie and Thomas Truebody Thomason were effective supporters.
