= Abdul Masih (missionary) =

Abdul Masih (1776–1827) was an Indian indigenous missionary, an ordained Anglican and Lutheran minister, as well as a religious author. He is often referred to as the most influential indigenous Christian to shape nineteenth-century Christian missions in India.

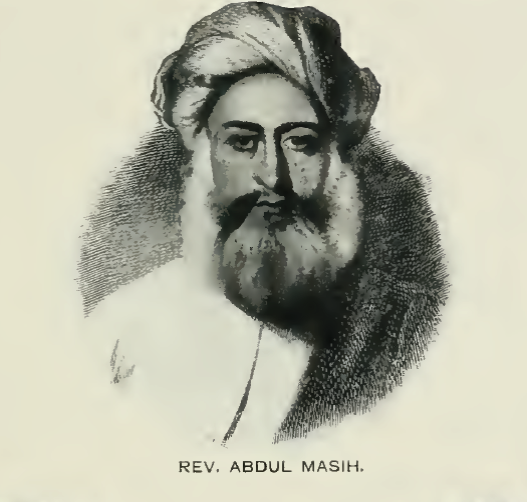
Rev. Abdul Masih

== Early years ==
Abdul Masih was born under the name, Sheikh Salih, to a devout Muslim Family in the town of Delhi. Growing up, his father instructed him in both Persian and Arabic.

As a young man, he devoted his time to studying and teaching in Lucknow. While studying here, he became quite respected as a Muslim scholar.

== Conversion and ordination ==
While Abdul Masih was teaching in Lucknow, he decided to visit Cawnpore where he befriended a British East India Company chaplain named Henry Martyn. Henry Martyn, who was the Chaplain of the station, would preach to the poor assembled before his door every Sunday afternoon to receive alms. Even though Abdul Masih was a very wealthy man, he became interested in Henry's preaching and started attending these services. It's told that Abdul Masih's first introduction to Gospel was Martyn's preaching on the Ten Commandments. In response to Martyn's preaching, at the age of thirty-eight Abdul Masih converted from Islam to Christianity. Abdul Masih, quite quickly sought further opportunities to acquire further information on Christ and the Christian Scriptures. He began to study Martyn's Urdu translation of the New Testament and befriended two other company chaplains, David Brown and Daniel Corrie.

In 1811, on a Sunday, he was baptized in the Old Church, Calcutta, by David Brown and was given the name Abdul Masih, an Arabic Christian name meaning "Servant of the Messiah." He spent years studying under Christian leaders, reading commentaries and scripture preparing himself for ministry. For the first eight years as a Christian he worked as a catechist for the Church Missionary Society in India. After these eight years, he was ordained by Lutheran Missionaries.

In December 1825 he reentered the Anglican Church and was the second ever ordained Indian minister under Bishop Heber of Calcutta.

Bishop Heber describes Abdul Masih,

"He is a very fine old man, with a magnificent gray beard, and of much more gentlemanly manners than any Christian native whom I have seen. He is every way fit for Holy Orders, and is a most sincere Christian, quite free, so far as I could observe, from all conceit and enthusiasm. His long eastern dress, his long gray beard, and his calm resigned countenance, give him already, almost the air of an apostle."

== Influence in Indian missions ==
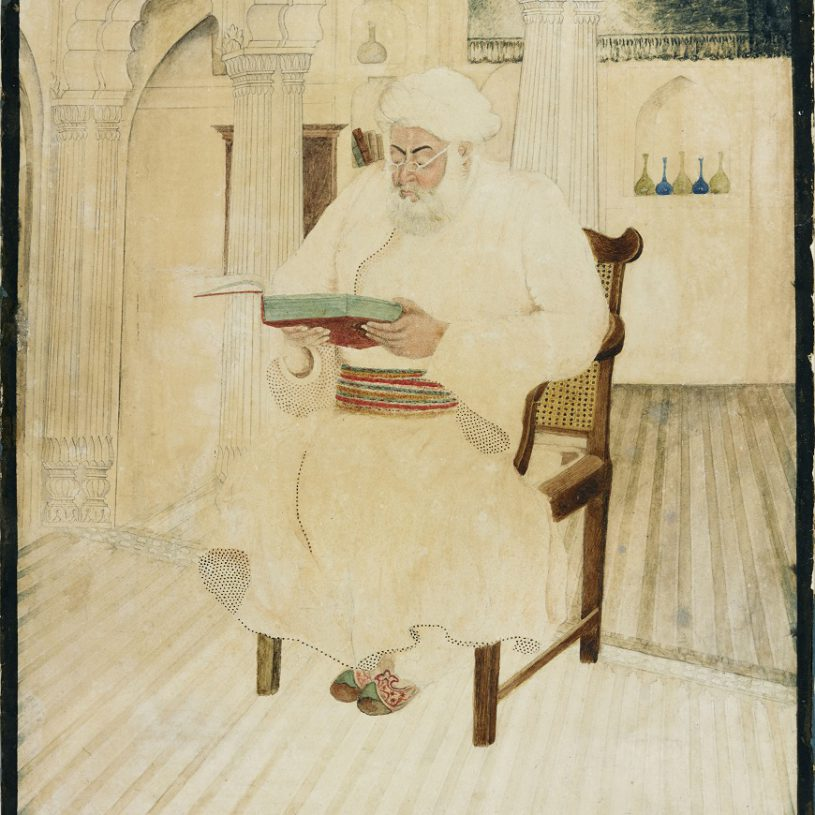
Depiction of Abdul Masih, an Indian Christian missionary

Abdul Masih's early ministry was very simple. He would travel to principal cities and regions and through his respectable character, his loving action and scholarly conversations, he introduced the subject of religion to Muslims of many social statuses. His travels caused much attention among the local communities as many would seek him out hoping to engage in conversation.

Abdul Masih's literary contributions include commentaries on Matthew's gospel, Romans, and Hebrews. Abdul Masih also kept quite extensive journals describing this religious struggles and philosophical ideas. These commentaries, as well as his journal, were quite sought after by many Christians in Northern India. Through these literary works, and his partnership with Daniel Corriein the years 1813-1814, about fifty Muslim adults were converted and baptized, including a few Muslims of very high stature.

Along with his conversation style ministry and literary contributions, Abdul Masih has been described as the pioneer medical missionary of the Christian Missionary Society. He was not very well trained in medicine, however, using his own funds, he began to set up a dispensary in Agra. Because of this, he became known as the Christian doctor.

== Death ==
After returning home to take care of his ill mother, Abdul Masih himself fell to ill health. While he suffered for several years he would continually declared that death no longer had any sting because he was unfearful of death due to the redemptive act of his Saviour.

Just before his death, he called out and requested to have the fourth chapter of John read to him. After the reading he concluded, "Thanks be to God!" He then requested the singing of his favorite hymn, which he composed.

Beloved Saviour, let not me
In thy kind heart forgotten be!
Of all that deck the field or bower,
Thou art the sweetest, fairset flower!

Youth's morn has fled, old age come on;
But sin distracts my soul alone:
Beloved Saviour, let not me
In thy kind heart forgotten be!

As the Hymn was sung a second time, Abdul Masih's illness caused him to become disorientated and quickly died on 4 March 1827 at the age of 51. A monument has been erected to his memory with an inscription in both Persian and English.
