= John Dodd (Reading MP) =

British politician (1717–1782)

John Dodd (24 September 1717 – 9 February 1782) was an English politician who sat in the House of Commons between 1741 and 1782.

== Life ==
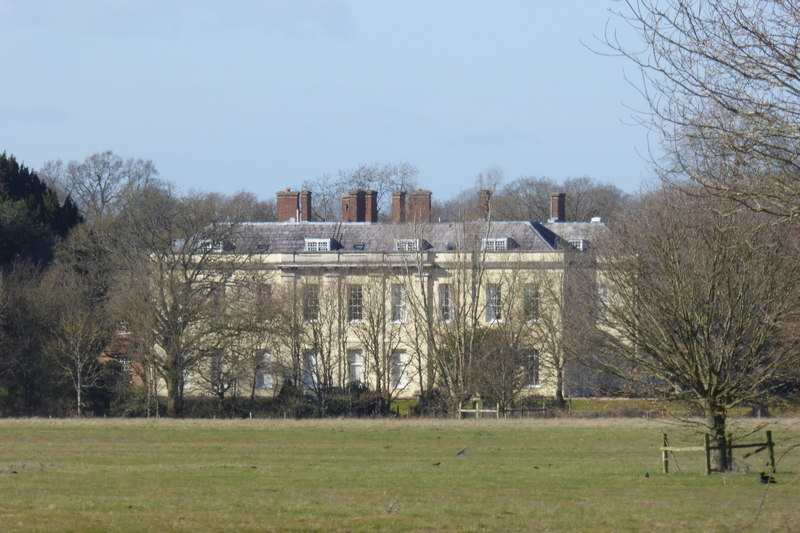
Swallowfield Park

Dodd was the only son of Randolph (or Randall) Dodd of Chester and was born on 24 September 1717. He succeeded his father in 1721. He was educated at Eton College from 1728 to 1732 and matriculated at King's College, Cambridge in 1735. Dodd was a close friend of Horace Walpole, and was returned as Whig Member of Parliament (MP) for Reading in 1741, and from 1755 to 1782. He became a Governor of the Foundling Hospital in 1739, and his second wife Juliana was an inspector of wet nurses in Berkshire for the Hospital.

Dodd lived at Swallowfield Park, near Reading. He married firstly Jane, the daughter of Henry Le Coq St. Leger of Shinfield, Berkshire, with whom he had 3 sons and a daughter and secondly Juliana, the daughter of Philip Jennings of Duddleston Hall, Shropshire, with whom he had a further son and 3 daughters. He died at Swallowfield on 9 February 1782. One of his daughters married Robert Dalzell, a brother of Frances Dalzell and grandson of Robert Dalzell.

Parliament of Great Britain
Preceded by William Strode; John Blagrave	Member of Parliament for Reading; February–May 1741; With: John Blagrave	Succeeded by John Blagrave; William Strode
Preceded by William Strode; The Viscount Fane	Member of Parliament for Reading; 1755 – 1782; With: The Viscount Fane to 1761; Sir Francis Knollys, Bt 1761–68; Henry Vansittart 1768–74; Francis Annesley from 1774	Succeeded by Francis Annesley; Richard Aldworth-Neville
