= Shaw Lefevre =

Shaw Lefevre was a double-barrelled surname created in 1789 through the marriage of Charles Shaw and Helena Lefevre. It was never hyphenated. The surname was held by a total of 24 people, and became extinct in 1936.

The name was held by a number of prominent people, including:

- Charles Shaw Lefevre (politician) (1759–1823), born Charles Shaw, British Whig politician
- Charles Shaw Lefevre, 1st Viscount Eversley (1794–1888), Speaker of the House of Commons, son of Charles Shaw Lefevre (MP)
- John Shaw Lefevre (1797–1879), British politician and civil servant, son of Charles Shaw Lefevre (MP)
- George Shaw Lefevre, 1st Baron Eversley (1831–1928), British Liberal Party politician, son of John Shaw Lefevre
- Madeleine Shaw Lefevre (1835–1914), first Principal of Somerville Hall (later Somerville College, Oxford), daughter of John Shaw Lefevre
