= Robert Vansittart =

Robert Vansittart may refer to:

- Robert Vansittart, 1st Baron Vansittart (1881–1957), British diplomat
- Robert Vansittart (judge) (1728–1789), British jurist and member of the Hellfire Club
- Robert Vansittart, son of Henry Vansittart, Governor of Bengal, 1759–64, credited with scoring the first recorded century in cricket in India
