= Charles Shaw-Lefevre =

Charles Shaw-Lefevre may refer to:

- Charles Shaw Lefevre (politician) (1759–1823), born Charles Shaw, British Whig politician
- Charles Shaw-Lefevre, 1st Viscount Eversley (1794–1888), his son, Speaker of the House of Commons
