= David Brown (East India Company chaplain) =

English chaplain in Bengal

David Brown (1763–1812) was an English chaplain in Bengal and founder of the Calcutta Bible Society.

== Life ==
He was born in Yorkshire, and was educated first under private tuition at Scarborough, and then at a grammar school at Hull under Joseph Milner. He entered Magdalene College, Cambridge in 1782 as a sizar.

Brown did not take a degree, but was ordained deacon in the Church of England in 1785, by Richard Watson. He was appointed to a chaplaincy in Bengal.

Brown reached Calcutta in 1786, and was placed in charge of an orphanage. At the same time he was appointed chaplain to the brigade at Fort William. In addition to these duties Brown took charge of the Old Mission Church of Calcutta. That year he met Charles Grant, and put together a "Proposal for Establishing a Protestant Mission in Bengal". It was passed to Charles Simeon, and then to William Wilberforce. Grant returned to Great Britain, and recruitment of evangelical chaplains for India got under way. In 1788 Brown gave up the orphanage position, incompatible with his work as pastor at the Old Mission Church, founded by John Kiernander.

In 1794 Brown was appointed presidency chaplain. Among his close friends were Henry Martyn, Claudius Buchanan, and Thomas Thomason. He became senior chaplain in 1797, when Thomas Blanshard left.

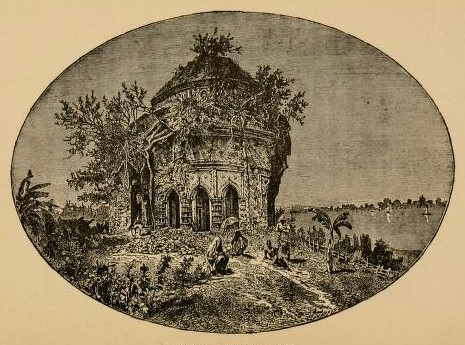
Ruined Hindu temple in Serampore, in the garden of Aldeen House, the property in the early 19th century of David Brown, and used by Henry Martyn

In 1803 Brown bought Aldeen House in Serampore, and made it his home. The grounds included a deserted temple. At this time Serampore was a colony of Danish India, and while the East India Company opposed missionary activity, the Lutheran Danish government was sympathetic, in particular to William Carey. Under the name the Pagoda, the abandoned Radha-vallabha temple next to the River Hooghly was used as an oratory by Henry Martyn, who often stayed with Brown. Aldeen House became a place of meeting of Baptist missionaries such as Carey, and the group of evangelical Anglican chaplains in Bengal. While personal relations were good, there were also tensions: Brown opposed Baptist efforts with the Calcutta Benevolent Institution, a free school, and there was a power struggle within the Serampore mission.

Brown's health was failing in 1812. He embarked, for the benefit of sea air, in a vessel bound for Madras, which was wrecked on the voyage down the Bay of Bengal. The passengers and crew were rescued by another vessel and taken back to Calcutta.

Brown died on 14 June 1812, at the house in Chowringhee of John Herbert Harington, president of the Calcutta Bible Society set up in 1811, as he was the secretary. Funeral sermons were preached by Daniel Corrie and Thomas Thomason.

== Family ==
Brown married, first, a Miss Robinson of Hull, who died in 1794; and then in 1796, to Frances Cowley, daughter of Hannah Cowley. On his death he left nine children. Buchanan mentioned three sons, who had been schooled in languages.

The family received support from the East India Company, moved to London, and Frances Brown died in Bristol, in 1822. Brown's children were:

- Jane Grant (1792–1821), the only surviving child of the first marriage, married Robert Merttins Bird in 1810 and remained in India.
- James Cowley Brown (died 1854), the eldest son, Bengal Civil Service
- Charles Philip Brown
- George Francis Brown of the Bengal Civil Service, writer in 1820, Magistrate and Collector of Juanpore in 1831;
- Hannah Elizabeth, the second daughter, married William Wilberforce Bird.
- Frances, died 1824 aged 1818.
- Ann Frushard (1804–1892), married the merchant Matthew Gisborne, son of Thomas Gisborne.
- Lydia Martyn, married in 1826 John Carysfort Proby, cleric and son of Baptist John Proby.
- Sarah Robinson, youngest daughter, married in 1831 George Merttins Bird.
