= Francis Annesley (1734–1812) =

English politician

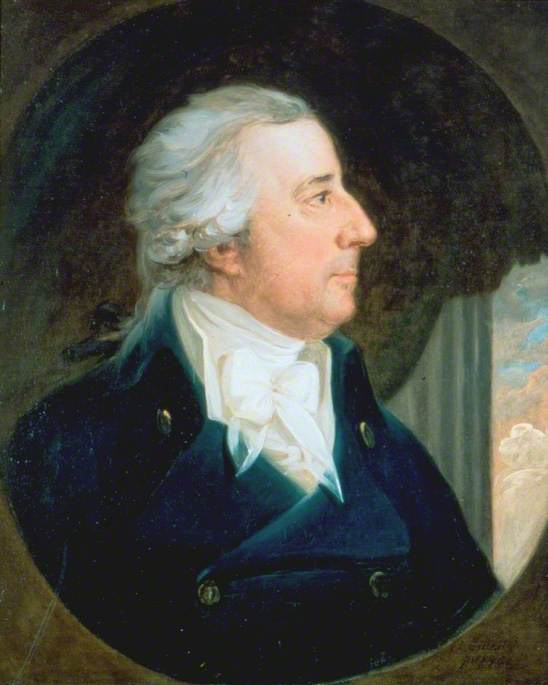
Francis Annesley

Francis Annesley (2 May 1734 – 17 April 1812) was an English politician who sat in the House of Commons for 32 years from 1774 to 1806, and was the first Master of Downing College, Cambridge.

== Early life ==
Annesley was the son of Martin Annesley D.D. of Bucklebury and Frilsham, Berkshire, and his wife Mary Hanbury, daughter of William Hanbury of Little Marcle, Herefordshire. He was educated at Reading School and was admitted at Gray's Inn in 1753 to study law.

== Career ==
Annesley was elected Member of Parliament for Reading in the 1774 general election, and retained the seat until 1806. In 1800 he was elected the first Master of Downing College, and awarded an LL.D. degree by Cambridge. He died unmarried on 17 April 1812.

== Family ==
Annesley had a family connection to Sir George Downing, 3rd Baronet, founder of Downing College. Frances Downing, the 3rd Baronet's aunt as sister to Sir George Downing, 2nd Baronet, married John Cotton, son of Sir John Cotton, 3rd Baronet. Their daughter, Frances Cotton, married John Hanbury, and was mother to Mary Hanbury, who was Annesley's mother. He was heir to Sir George Downing, 3rd Baronet, but the effective founding of Downing College was long delayed by litigation with other parties, in which he was heavily involved.

== Notes ==
Parliament of Great Britain
Preceded by John Dodd; Henry Vansittart	Member of Parliament for Reading; 1774–1806; With: John Dodd; Richard Aldworth-Neville; John Simeon	Succeeded by Charles Shaw-Lefevre; John Simeon
