= Madeleine Shaw Lefevre =

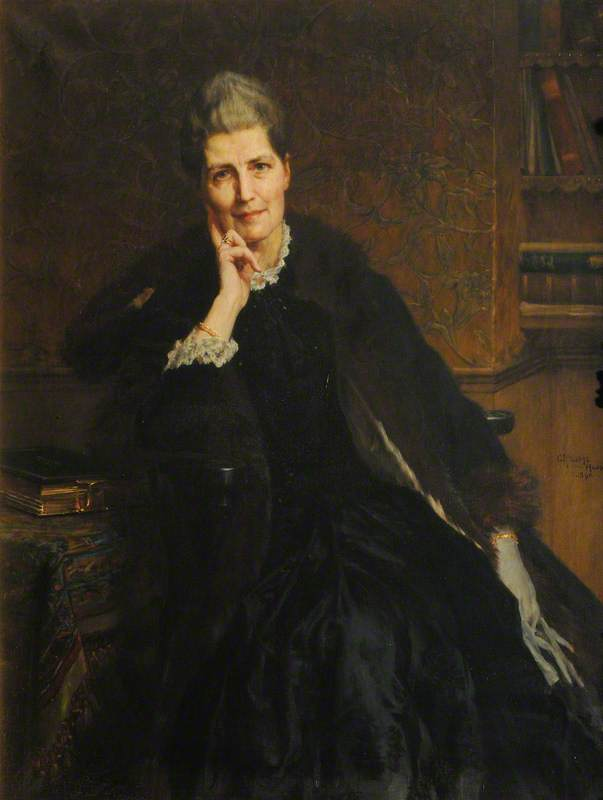
Madeleine Shaw Lefevre, 1890 portrait

Madeleine Septimia Shaw Lefevre (6 May 1835 – 19 September 1914) was the Principal of Somerville Hall from 1879 to 1889. The hall became Somerville College, Oxford in 1894.

== Early life ==
Shaw Lefevre was born in 1835, the seventh child of the barrister and politician John Shaw Lefevre, and his wife, Rachael Emily Wright. As a member of the prominent Shaw Lefevre family of civil servants and politicians, Madeline benefited from a privileged upbringing, although surprisingly little is known about her early life.

In 1866, she travelled to Fredericton, New Brunswick, to visit her sister Rachael, whose husband Arthur Hamilton-Gordon was Lieutenant-Governor, and from there Shaw Lefevre travelled with the Hamilton-Gordons to Trinidad, where she stayed for some months.

Shaw Lefevre first became involved in public life during the 1870s, probably through the influence of Julia Reynolds-Moreton, Countess of Ducie, the mother-in-law of Shaw Lefevre's brother, George. The Countess was a founding member of the Workhouse Visiting Society, and through this connection Shaw Lefevre became a member of the central committee of the Metropolitan Association for Befriending Young Servants.

== Somerville Hall ==
Shaw Lefevre was appointed Principal of the new Somerville Hall in Oxford on 13 May 1879. Shaw Lefevre was not an academic, had no formal educational experience (having been educated at home), and was not even on the original shortlist of candidates. However, she was known to the selection committee through her own social work and charity experience, as well as the work of her father, who had been Vice-Chancellor of the University of London between 1842 and 1862. Nevertheless, Shaw Lefevre was a reluctant appointee, and only accepted the position on condition that the post would last for just one year, and that she would only need to be present during term time. In the event, she remained head of the hall for 10 years. Her salary was £100 a year plus free board and lodging, a nominal amount which was considerably less than any of her male counterparts.

She started at Somerville Hall in 1879 with 12 students based in a house on Woodstock Road in Walton Manor, purchased from St John's College, Oxford, which became known as "House". She ran the Hall along the lines established by Anne Clough for Newnham Hall, later Newnham College, Cambridge. The hall was non-denominational and had no chapel (the Anglican Lady Margaret Hall opened in the same year). The Hall expanded to West Buildings in 1885, later renamed "Park".

Shaw Lefevre's chief task during her term as Principal was to establish Somerville on a sustainable long-term footing, and this she achieved. She used her personal and political connections to raise money for the College, working to secure the freehold on which its buildings stood, and took a full part in the administration of both the College and the University. Crucially, she gave opponents of women's education little opportunity to attack the College, collaborating closely with her counterpart at Lady Margaret, Elizabeth Wordsworth. Her work was rewarded in 1884, when women were finally permitted to take exams (although they could not graduate until 1920).

The pressure of her work led Shaw Lefevre to submit her resignation in 1885, a decision which she only withdrew after securing a leave of absence for six months. She used this time to once again visit the Hamilton-Gordons, this time in Ceylon. One of the 35 students in her final year, 1889, was Cornelia Sorabji. Thirteen of the 82 students during her tenure achieved marks equivalent to a first-class degree. She was succeeded as Principal by Agnes Catherine Maitland. In addition to her work at Somerville, Shaw Lefevre also became a trustee of Bedford College for Women in London from 1885.

== Later life ==
Shaw Lefevre retired in 1889, and lived in Farnham, Surrey, with her unmarried sisters. She remained on the Council of Somerville, and was active in its transactions. She also became involved in school committee work in Farnham.

Shaw Lefevre died at Farnham and was buried in Ascot.

== See also ==
- Dame Elizabeth Wordsworth, Shaw Lefevre's counterpart at Lady Margaret Hall.

== Sources ==
- Enid Huws Jones, ‘Lefevre, Madeleine Septimia Shaw-(1835–1914)’, Oxford Dictionary of National Biography, Oxford University Press, 2004 accessed 13 Nov 2015
- F.M.G. Willson, A Strong Supporting Cast: The Shaw Lefevres, 1789-1936 (The Athlone Press, 1993)

Academic offices
Preceded by First in post	Principal; Somerville College, Oxford; 1879-1889	Succeeded by Agnes Catherine Maitland
