= Henry Vansittart =

British Governor of Bengal (1732–1770)

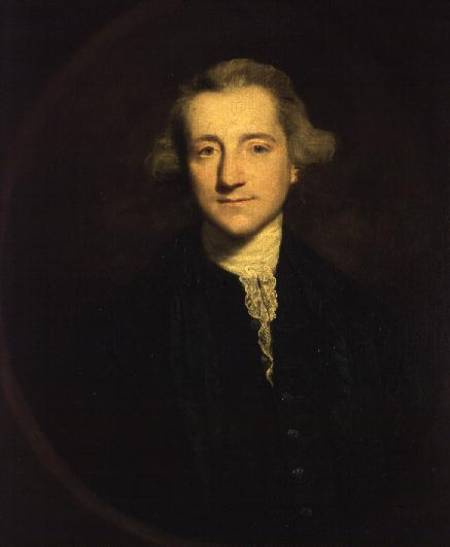
- Portrait by Sir Joshua Reynolds

Governor of the Presidency of Fort William
- In office 1762–1764
- Preceded by: Robert Clive
- Succeeded by: Robert Clive

Personal details
- Born: 3 June 1732 Bloomsbury, Middlesex, England
- Died: 1770 (aged 37) Presumed to have died at sea in the Mozambique Channel
- Education: Reading School; Winchester College

Henry Vansittart (3 June 1732 – 1770) was an English colonial administrator, who was the Governor of Bengal from 1759 to 1764.

== Life ==
Vansittart was born in Bloomsbury in Middlesex, the third son of Arthur van Sittart (1691–1760), and his wife Martha, daughter of Sir John Stonhouse, 3rd Baronet. His father and his grandfather, Peter van Sittart (1651–1705), were both wealthy merchants and directors of the Russia Company. Peter, a merchant adventurer, who had migrated from Danzig to London about 1670, was also a director of the East India Company. The family name is taken from the town of Sittard in Limburg, the Netherlands. They settled at Shottesbrooke in Berkshire.

Educated at Reading School and at Winchester College, Henry Vansittart joined the society of the Franciscans, or the Hellfire Club, at Medmenham. His elder brothers, Arthur and Robert, were also members of this fraternity.

In 1745, at the age of thirteen, he entered service of the East India Company as a writer and sailed for Fort St David in Madras. Here he showed himself very industrious, made the acquaintance of Robert Clive and rose rapidly from one position to another, although he spent three years back in England from 1751.

He returned to India in 1754 and became a member of the Council of Madras in 1757. He helped to defend the city against the French in 1759, and was appointed to replace Clive, on Clive's recommendation, as President of the Council and Governor of Fort William in Bengal in November 1760.

He arrived in Bengal in July 1760, finding himself in a difficult political position, including a serious lack of funds. He deposed the Nawab of Bengal, Mir Jafar, and replaced the Nawab with the Nawab's son-in-law, Mir Kasim, which increased the influence of England in the province. Vansittart was, however, less successful in another direction. Practically all the company's servants were traders in their private capacity, and as they claimed various privileges and exemptions this system was detrimental to the interests of the native princes and gave rise to an enormous amount of corruption. Vansittart sought to check this, and in 1762 he made a treaty with Mir Kasim, but the majority of Vansittart's council were against him and in the following year this was repudiated. Reprisals on the part of the subadar were followed by war and, annoyed at the failure of his pacific schemes, Vansittart resigned on 28 November 1764 and returned to England.

To defend his conduct in Bengal, Vansittart published three volumes of papers as A Narrative of the Transactions in Bengal from 1760 to 1764 (London, 1766). His conduct was attacked before the board of directors in London, but events seemed to prove that he was in the right, and in 1769 he became a director of the company. In 1768 he had been elected to a seat in Parliament for Reading.

Clive had returned to India and exposed the rampant corruption. Vansittart, Luke Scrafton, and another official, Francis Forde, were sent to India to examine the administrative problems and reform the whole government in India. The mission left England in September 1769, visited Cape Town where they were last reported, embarking, on 27 December 1769, but the ship in which they sailed, the frigate Aurora, was lost at sea, apparently foundered with all hands. The captain had decided to navigate the Mozambique Channel, despite bad weather.

== Family ==
Vansittart married Emilia Morse (died 1819), daughter of Nicholas Morse, Governor of Madras, in 1754. They had five sons (Henry, Arthur, Robert, George, and Nicholas), and two daughters, (Emilia and Sophie). They resided in England at Foxley's Manor in Bray, Berkshire.

Of the sons:

- Henry, the eldest (1756–1787), married Catherine Maria Powney.
- Robert Vansittart, scored the first recorded cricket century in India, 102 for Old Etonians v. Rest of Calcutta in 1804.
- The youngest, Nicholas Vansittart, 1st Baron Bexley, was Chancellor of the Exchequer from 12 May 1812 to 31 January 1823.

== See also ==
- List of people who disappeared

Parliament of Great Britain
Preceded by John Dodd; Sir Francis Knollys, Bt	Member of Parliament for Reading; 1768–1774; With: John Dodd	Succeeded by John Dodd; Francis Annesley
