= Charles Grant (British East India Company) =

British politician

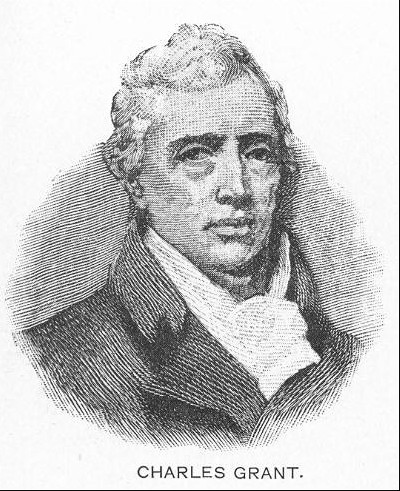
Charles Grant

Charles Grant (Teàrlach Grannd in Scottish Gaelic; 16 April 1746 – 31 October 1823) was a British politician influential in Indian and domestic affairs who, motivated by his evangelical Christianity, championed the causes of "social reform" and Christian mission, particularly in India. He served as Chairman of the British East India Company, and as a member of parliament (MP), and was an energetic member of the Clapham Sect. The "Clapham Sect" were a group of social activists who spoke out about the moral imperative to end slavery.

Henry Thornton, the founder of the Clapham sect, regarded Grant as his closest friend, after Wilberforce, and Grant planned and paid for a house called 'Glenelg' on Henry's estate in Battersea. It was a twin to, and lay near to the house built on the same estate for Wilberforce after his marriage, the location of which is marked by a plaque at No.111 Broomwood Road, west of that section of Battersea Rise now called Clapham Common West Side. Grant later moved to live in Russell Square.

== Life ==
Grant was born at the farmhouse of Aldourie, Inverness-shire, Scotland in March 1746, when his father, Alexander Grant, known as 'Alister-an-claigh' ('Alexander the Sword(sman)')– a reflection of his martial talents, was fighting for the Jacobites, against the British Crown, and the following month fought at the Battle of Culloden. His father was severely wounded but survived, joined a Highland regiment which the government raised for service in America and died at Havana in 1762, of fever he contracted during the siege of Havana. Charles Grant's mother was Margaret MacBean, daughter of Donald Macbean Esq., Tacksman (tenant) of Aldourie in the parish of Dores, descended from the Macbeans of Kinchyle. However, Charles Grant himself was one of the growing number of Scots who prospered in the service of the British Empire. In 1767, Grant travelled to India to take up a military position. Over subsequent years, he rose in the ranks of the British East India Company. Initially, he became superintendent over its trade in Bengal.

During a trip back to Britain, and after a short engagement, Charles married Jane Fraser, daughter of Thomas Fraser of Balnain and his wife Elizabeth Mackinnon, on 23rd February 1773 at St Clement Danes, Westminster. The couple sailed soon afterwards to Bombay aboard the Vansittart. Jane died at the family's home in Bloomsbury, London, on 22nd January 1827.

Then, in 1787, having first acquired a personal fortune through silk manufacturing in Malda, Lord Cornwallis the Governor-General appointed Grant as a member of the East India Company's board of trade. Grant lived a profligate lifestyle as he climbed through the ranks, but after losing two children to smallpox he underwent a religious conversion. Viewing his life, including his efforts in India, from his new evangelical Christian perspective, moulded his career for the rest of his life.

Grant returned to Britain in 1790 and was elected to Parliament in 1802 for Inverness-shire. He served as an MP until failing health forced him to retire in 1818. However, his relationship with the East India Company did not end. In 1804, he joined the company's Court of Directors, and in 1805, he became its chairman. He died on 31 October 1823, at his home, No.40 Russell Square, London, at the age of 77.

His eldest son, Charles, was born in India and later followed his father into politics, eventually becoming a British peer as Baron Glenelg. His other son, Robert, followed his father into the Indian service and became Governor of Bombay, as well as being a Christian hymn writer.

== Indian affairs ==
Grant turned to evangelicalism around 1776, eight years after first visiting India. As the Commercial Resident at Malda, he came into contact with local people who were suffered from famine and flood, and showed compassion to them. However, he believed that the locals lacked "integrity, truth, and faithfulness", and that converting them to Christianity would solve this problem.

In 1786, he and Calcutta's new chaplain David Brown wrote the Proposal for Establishing a Protestant Mission in Bengal. The Company administration did not take the proposal seriously, but with Brown's encouragement, Grant sent a copy to the Cambridge cleric Charles Simeon, who recruited Evangelical chaplains for India. British politician William Wilberforce also supported the proposal.

In preparation for the renewal of the company's charter in 1793, Grant wrote a larger and a much more controversial paper titled Observations on the State of Society among the Asiatic Subjects of Great Britain particular with respect to Morals; and on the means of improving it (1792). In this paper, he contended that India could be advanced socially and morally by compelling the company to permit Christian missionaries into India, a view diametrically opposed to the long-held position of the East India Company that Christian missionary work in India conflicted with its commercial interests and should be prohibited. He presented the Indian caste system as a form of systemic despotism, and stated that the Indian people were "universally and wholly corrupt", "exceedingly depraved", and "lamentably degenerate". He argued that the company needed to support the Christian missionaries in improving this situation. The paper also proposed other methods for the welfare of Indians, including the introduction of the English language for communication of knowledge, and application of machinery to agriculture and other fields.

Grant and Wilberforce pressed for the inclusion of a "Pious Clause" in the 1793 charter of the company: this would empower the company's Court of Directors to appoint schoolmasters, missionaries, and other people to propagate Christian teachings among Indians. In 1797, Grant presented his essay to the company's directors. The directors opposed the proposal, describing the idea of sending missionaries to India as "the wildest, maddest, most expensive, and most unwarranted plan that was ever proposed by a lunatic enthusiast", in an 1801 memorandum to the British Parliament. However, Wilberforce and his allies successfully lobbied for their ideas to be included at the next renewal of the charter in 1813. The "Pious Clause" included in the 1813 charter did not specifically mention the missionaries, but the company committed to supporting the Anglican Bishop of Calcutta and three archdeaconries.

As chairman of the company, Grant used his position to sponsor many chaplains to India, among them Claudius Buchanan and Henry Martyn.

Grant was largely responsible for the foundation of East India Company College (1806-1858), which initially occupied Hertford Castle before moving to a purpose-built campus at Haileybury.

== Christian humanitarianism ==
Grant was part of an evangelical Anglican movement of close friends whose notable members included the abolitionist Wilberforce, Zachary Macaulay, John Venn, Henry Thornton, and John Shore, who lived in close proximity around Clapham Common southwest of London. For some years from 1796, Grant himself lived in a large villa called Glenelg in proximity to Wilberforce and Thornton. This 'Clapham sect' welded evangelical theology with the cause of social reform. Both in India and in Britain's Parliament, Grant campaigned for the furtherance of causes of education, social reform, and Christian mission. In 1791, he helped establishing the Sierra Leone Company, which gave refuge to freed slaves. Also in 1791, as an influential supporter of the abolition of slavery in all its forms, he was elected to the London Abolition Committee. He served as a vice-president of the British and Foreign Bible Society from its establishment in 1804, and also supported the Church Missionary Society and the Society for the Propagation of the Gospel.

== See also ==
- Charles Grant– A ship that sailed for the East India Company between 1810 and 1833.

Parliament of the United Kingdom
Preceded by John Simon Frederick Fraser	Member of Parliament for Inverness-shire; 1802 – 1818	Succeeded by Charles Grant
