= Sir John Simeon, 1st Baronet =

English barrister and politician

Sir John Simeon, 1st Baronet (1756 – 4 February 1824) of Walliscot in Oxfordshire was Member of Parliament (MP) for Reading in Berkshire from 1797 to 1802 and from 1806 to 1818. He also practised as barrister and a member of Lincoln's Inn, and held the offices of Recorder of Reading 1779-1807 and Master in Chancery from 1795 until 1808 when he became Senior Master, and was created 1st Baronet Simeon in 1815.

Simeon was the second eldest son of Richard Simeon (died 1784) and Elizabeth Hutton. His elder brother, named Richard after their father, died early. The third brother, Edward Simeon, was a director of the Bank of England. His youngest brother, Charles Simeon, became a prominent evangelical clergyman.

== Family ==
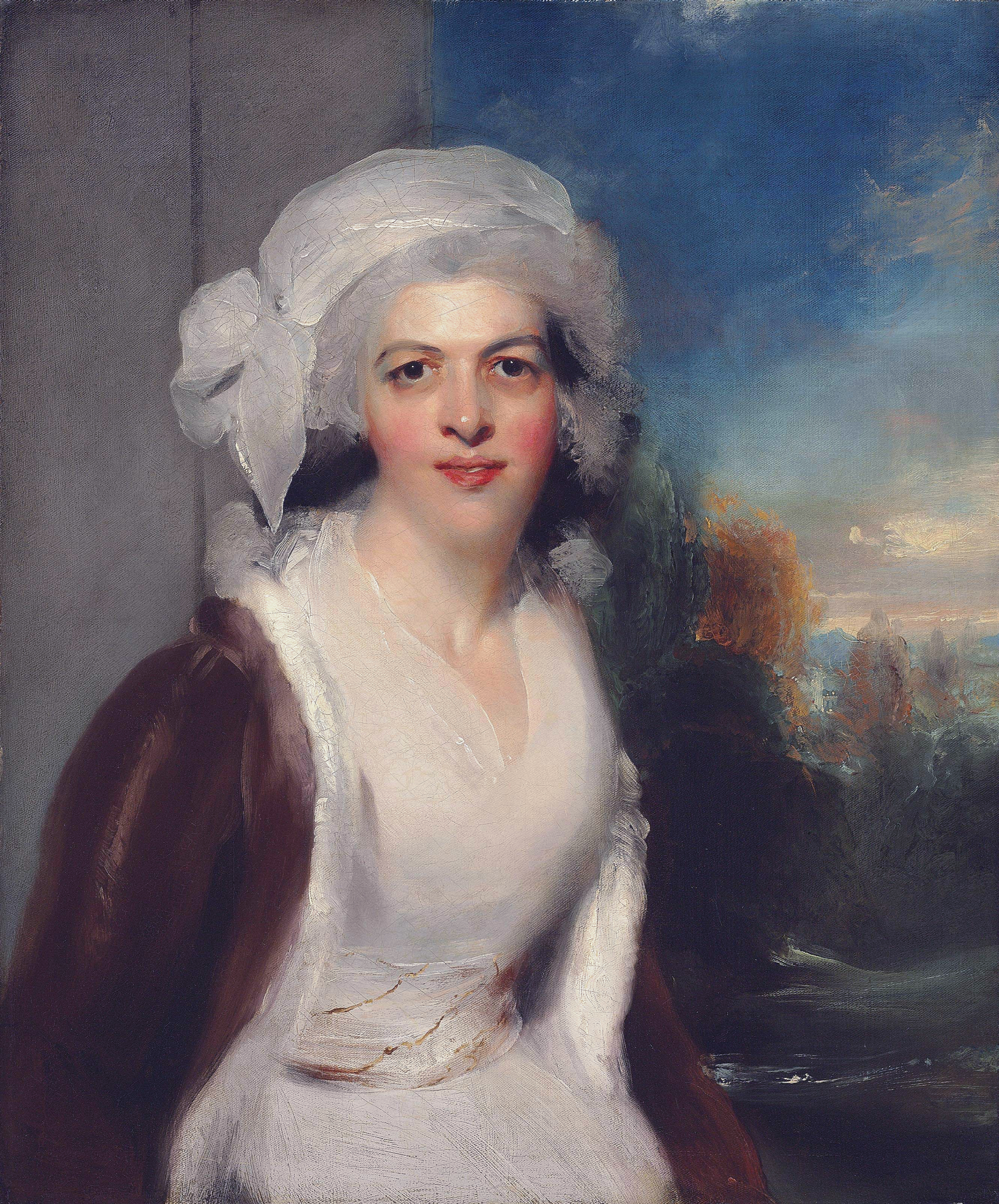
Rebecca, Lady Simeon (d. 1830) (Thomas Lawrence)

John Simeon married Rebecca Cornwall, daughter of John Cornwall of Hendon House in Middlesex, in 1783. They had a number of children:

- Richard Godin Simeon (21 May 1784 – 11 January 1855) married Louisa Edith Barrington (1790–1847) on 8 April 1813, producing three sons and two daughters
- Harriet Simeon (died 15 November 1845) married Sir Frederick Francis Baker, 2nd Baronet in July 1814, producing 1 daughter and 3 sons.
- Edward Simeon (1788 - 16 October 1851) on 3 September 1814 married Sophia Charlotte Lybbe-Powys of Hardwick House (2 July 1796 – 23 February 1833)
- Charlotte Simeon (died 1845)
- Eleanora Simeon
- Charles Simeon

Coat of arms of Sir John Simeon, 1st Baronet
Crest A fox passant-reguardant Proper in the mouth a trefoil slipped Vert. Escutcheon Per fess Sable and Or a pale counterchanged in chief an ermine spot of the first between two trefoils slipped of the second and in base a like trefoil between two like ermine spots. Supporters Dexter a fox reguardant Proper in the mouth a trefoil slipped Vert, sinister a lion Gules ducally crowned Or. Motto Serviendo; Nec Temere Nec Timide

== Notes ==
Parliament of Great Britain
Preceded by Richard Aldworth-Neville; Francis Annesley	Member of Parliament for Reading; 1797 – 1800; With: Francis Annesley	Succeeded by Parliament of the United Kingdom
Parliament of the United Kingdom
Preceded by Parliament of Great Britain	Member of Parliament for Reading; 1801 – 1802; With: Francis Annesley	Succeeded by Francis Annesley; Charles Shaw-Lefevre
Preceded by Francis Annesley; Charles Shaw-Lefevre	Member of Parliament for Reading; 1806 – 1818; With: Charles Shaw-Lefevre	Succeeded by Charles Fyshe Palmer; Charles Shaw-Lefevre
Baronetage of the United Kingdom
New title	Baronet of Grazeley, Berkshire; 1815–1824	Succeeded by Richard Godin Simeon
