= Simeon Monument =

Monument in Reading, Berkshire, England

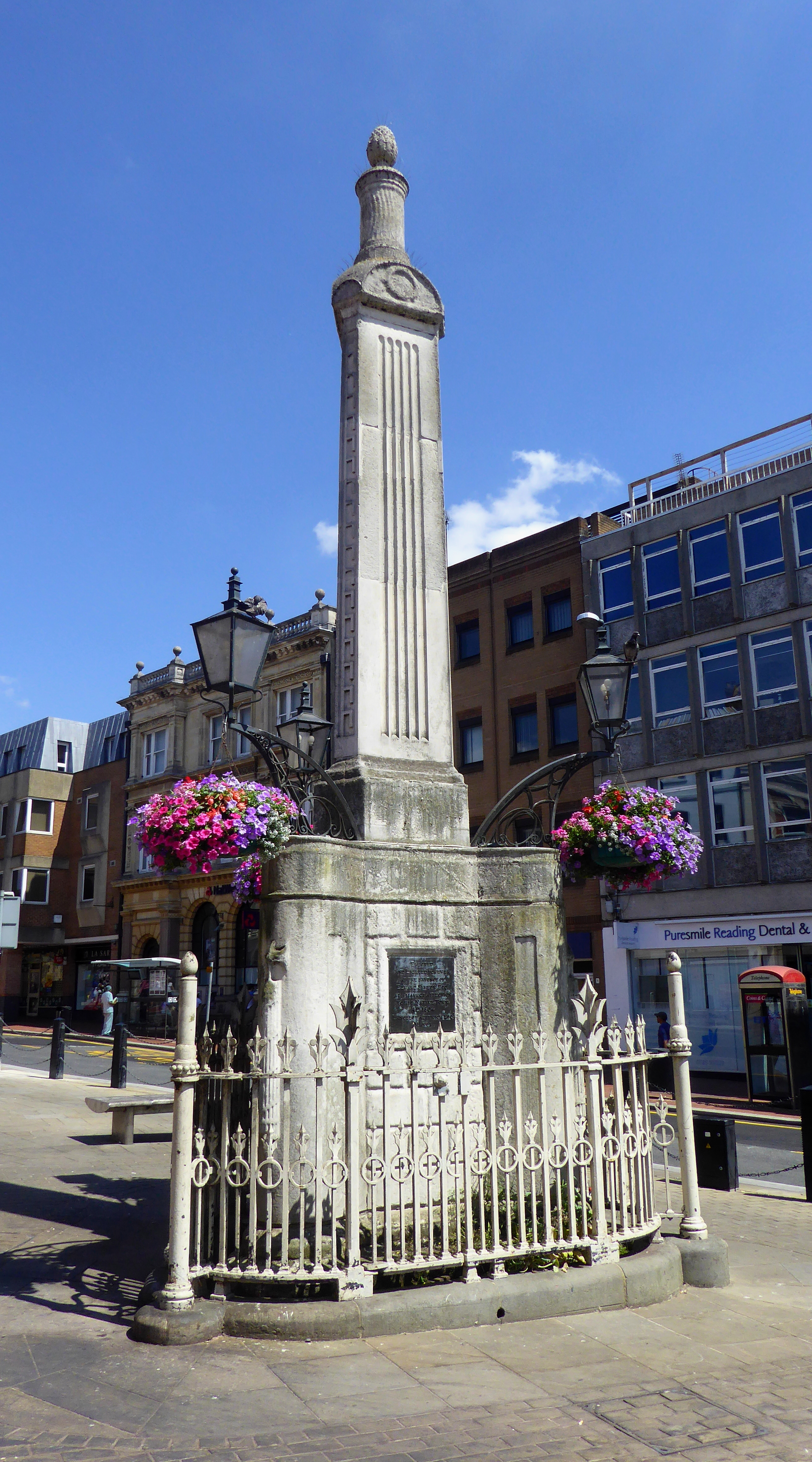
- Interactive map of Simeon Monument
- Location: Reading, Berkshire, England
- Coordinates: 51°27′20″N 0°58′10″W
- Designer: John Soane
- Material: Portland stone
- Height: 25 feet (7.6 m)
- Completion date: 1804
- Restored date: 2007

Listed Building – Grade II*
- Official name: The Simeon Monument
- Designated: 22 March 1957
- Reference no.: 1113534

The Simeon Monument, also known as the Soane Obelisk, the Soane Monument and the Simeon Obelisk, (Note: All four names are in common use. The structure was commissioned and funded by Simeon and designed by Soane.) is a stone structure in Market Place, the former site of the market in Reading, Berkshire. It was commissioned by Edward Simeon, a Reading-born merchant who became extremely wealthy as a City of London trader. Simeon's brother, John, was a former Member of Parliament for Reading who had lost his seat in the 1802 elections to the parliament of the newly created United Kingdom of Great Britain and Ireland, since which time the family had been engaged in ostentatious spending locally in an effort to gain support among the town's voters.

Although street lighting had been installed in Reading in 1797, the system used was one of lamps attached to the sides of buildings and as a consequence open spaces remained unlit. In 1804 Simeon persuaded the Mayor of Reading that it would be of benefit to erect a structure in Market Place, which would serve both to carry lamps to light the area and to improve the flow of traffic in the area, and volunteered to pay for such a structure himself.

Simeon commissioned local architect John Soane to design a suitable structure. Soane designed an unusual triangular structure, 25 feet (7.6 m) tall and built of Portland stone. It had no official unveiling or opening ceremony, but the stonework was complete by September 1804. The structure was immediately controversial, denounced within weeks of its opening as "a paltry gew-gaw thing without use, or name", built by Simeon to promote himself rather than for the public benefit. In early 1805, Simeon donated an annuity of 3% interest on £1,000 to pay for the lamps on the obelisk to be lit in perpetuity.

By 1900 a cabmen's shelter had been erected next to the monument, and in 1933 underground public toilets had been built alongside it. Although Simeon had stipulated that the lamps were to remain lighted forever, by this time the lamps were no longer operational, having been replaced by baskets of flowers in 1911. Although the monument was Grade II listed in 1957, by this time it was becoming extremely dilapidated. The market was relocated away from Market Place in the 1970s, and the obelisk avoided demolition primarily owing to lobbying by admirers of Soane, as it was the last surviving structure in Reading to have been designed by him.

In 2005 Reading Borough Council agreed to landscape Market Place and to renovate the Simeon Monument. The now-disused toilets and other structures around the monument were removed, and the monument itself was restored to its former condition.

== Background ==
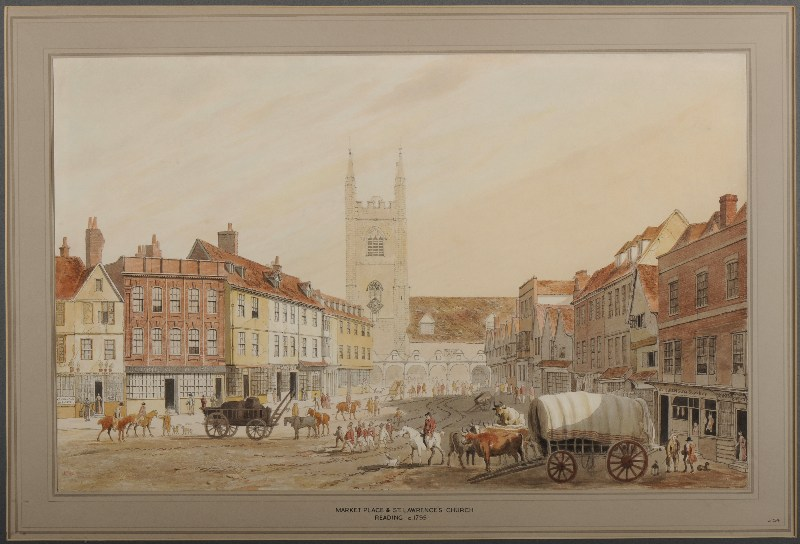
Market Place, Reading, c. 1795

The town of Reading is at the confluence of the River Thames and River Kennet, approximately 40 miles (64 km) west of London. The settlement has existed since at least the Anglo-Saxon period, it became a prominent town in 1121 following the foundation of Reading Abbey. Located on the Great West Road, the main route connecting London to Bath and Bristol, and with the Thames providing direct shipping routes to London and Oxford, the city grew prosperous and became a major industrial centre, particularly noted for its iron production and breweries, as well as a major market town for the surrounding area.

Market Place in Reading was a large triangular piece of open land, surrounded by shops, which since the 12th century had been the site of Reading's market. The Borough Corporation maintained the area, in return for a tax of one pint of corn from each sack sold. While the outdoor market in Market Place had traditionally specialised in dairy produce, meat and poultry, the sale of these items had been moved to a nearby purpose-built market hall in 1800, leaving Market Place dealing with trade in grain, fruit, vegetables and "colonial or manufactured articles"; Reading was considered one of the cheapest places in the country to buy imported and manufactured items. By the early 19th century, around 200 wagons of produce would arrive in Reading on busy market days.

Although Reading had introduced street lighting in 1797, this system did not use lamp posts and instead consisted of oil lamps attached to the walls of buildings. As a consequence, open areas such as Market Place remained unlit other than around their edges.

=== John Soane ===
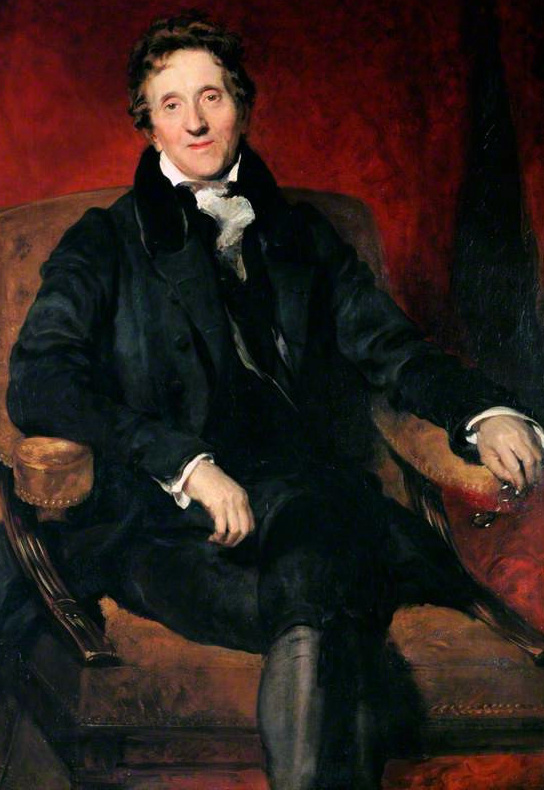
Portrait of John Soane by Thomas Lawrence, 1829

John Soane (from 1831 Sir John Soane) was a local architect, born in nearby Goring in 1753 and educated at William Baker's Academy in Reading. After a successful early career designing country houses, on 16 October 1788 he was appointed architect and surveyor to the Bank of England. In addition to his work for the Bank of England he continued to design other buildings, including in 1789 a brewery on Bridge Street, Reading, and in 1796 a house for Lancelot Austwick, who was to become Mayor of Reading in 1803.

=== Edward Simeon ===
Edward Simeon (c.1755–1812) was a Reading-born merchant, who became extremely wealthy as a City of London trader. From 1792 he was a director of the Bank of England. Although he lived in London, in Salvadore House on White Hart Court, (Note: Salvadore House, itself partially designed by Soane, was on White Hart Court, near present-day St Botolph-without-Bishopsgate. Windsor (1993) states that it was demolished in 1875 during the construction of Bishopsgate railway station, but that was some distance further north and was built at a much earlier date; the station in question was actually Liverpool Street station which is also located on Bishopsgate.) he maintained links with Reading. His 1792 wedding took place there, and he regularly donated clothing to the poor children of the town. The Simeon family were prominent in the town; John Simeon, brother to Edward, was the Recorder of Reading and a Tory politician who had been elected MP for the town in the 1796 British general election, lost his seat in the 1802 election to the parliament of the newly created United Kingdom, and successfully regained the seat in the 1806 general election. John Simeon was a controversial and reactionary figure who opposed the poor being taught arithmetic or writing, and following his defeat in 1802 the Simeon family had been engaged in ostentatious efforts to curry favour with the approximately 300 men who were entitled to vote in Reading's elections. (Note: In the event John Simeon and Charles Shaw-Lefevre were the only two candidates to stand for the two seats in the constituency in the 1806 election. Despite his brother running unopposed, Edward Simeon nonetheless is alleged to have bribed all those who voted in 1806 for John Simeon alone with two hams, and those who voted for both candidates with one.)

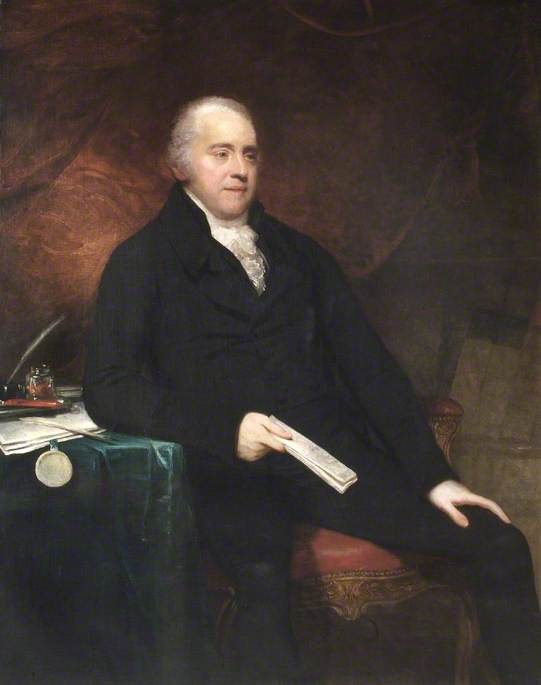
Edward Simeon in 1808. The paper in his hand reads "Reading Lighting".

Concerned about the appearance of the Market Place and the congestion caused by traffic passing through it, Simeon wrote to Lancelot Austwick, the Mayor of Reading, on 24 January 1804:

It has very often struck me that the want of light in so great a public spot as the Market Place was productive of inconvenience which every inhabitant and neighbour must experience ... [I] request you will make known my desire of erecting at my own expense an obelisk in the centre of the Market Place protected with iron railings and spurs or curb stones to resist the heaviest shock of a waggon. The obelisk to have four lamps—to invest in the name of the M&B (Note: Mayor and Burgesses.) such a sum as will defray for ever the expense of lighting the same during the period when the other lamps are lighted. The erection will contribute largely to prevent the confusion which now prevails with the wagons on market days by obliging the drivers to take a regular line. The architect will be directed to present the proposed plan and carry the same into immediate effect.

Austwick approved Simeon's plan, and John Soane was approached to design an obelisk with the dual purpose of acting as an obstruction to prevent wagons driving across Market Place, and holding four lamps to illuminate the area.

== Design and construction ==
Soane's initial design was based on an unbuilt Palladian structure Soane had designed for Norwich Market, comprising a square base with Ionic columns supporting a cupola and four lamps on diagonally-set piers; the cupola would in turn be topped with a caduceus. (Note: Soane's design for the Norwich Market scheme is undated, and it is possible, albeit unlikely, that he used his discarded Reading design for Norwich.) He soon rejected this shape in favour of an unconventional triangular design. It is unrecorded why he made this choice; Sowan (2007) speculates that it may have been inspired by triangular Roman lamps Soane had seen on a recent visit to Pompeii, although it is more likely to be a response to the triangular shape of Market Place itself. His final design was a mixture of differing architectural styles, and consisted of a triangular base with each corner supporting a wrought iron lamp, surrounding a fluted three-sided Portland stone column, which in turn supported a stone cylinder topped with a bronze or copper pinecone. (Note: Pinecones were a symbol of the tree of life and of eternity. The Monument's listing on the National Heritage List for England erroneously describes the pinecone as a pineapple.) In total, the structure was to be 25 feet (7.6 m) tall.

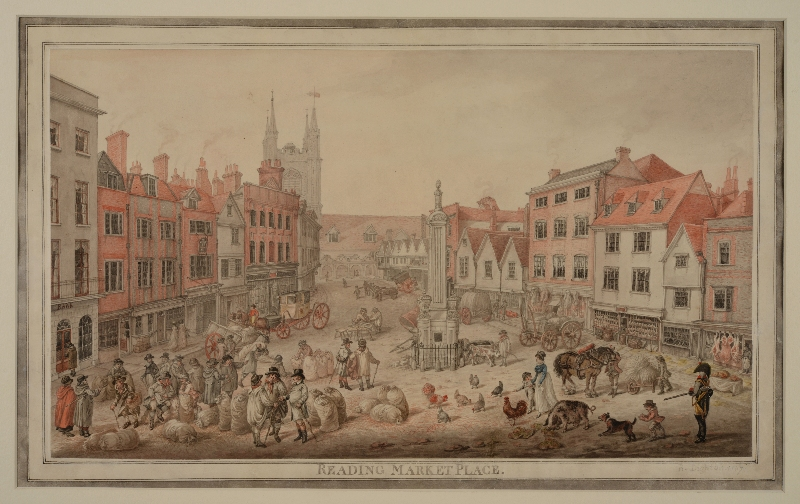
Market Place in 1807, with the newly erected monument

In May 1804, the Borough Corporation approved Simeon and Soane's scheme, although the proposed metal pinecone was replaced with a pinecone in carved stone, and by 20 July Soane was in Reading supervising construction. Robert Spiller was paid £310 3/– (about £27,000 in 2025 terms) to build the structure. Bricklayer J Lovegrove built the brick core of the base, James Marshall was stonemason, and Thomas Russell the blacksmith. The base of the structure was adorned with a large metal plaque reading:

Erected
and Lighted for ever
at the expence of
Edward Simeon Esq^{r}.
As a mark of affection
to his Native Town
A.D.1804.
Lancelot Austwick Esq^{r}.
Mayor.

On the remaining two sides are bronze works, one consisting of the arms of Simeon, the other showing a crowned head surrounded by four uncrowned heads. The corner columns bear carved fasces.

== Completion ==
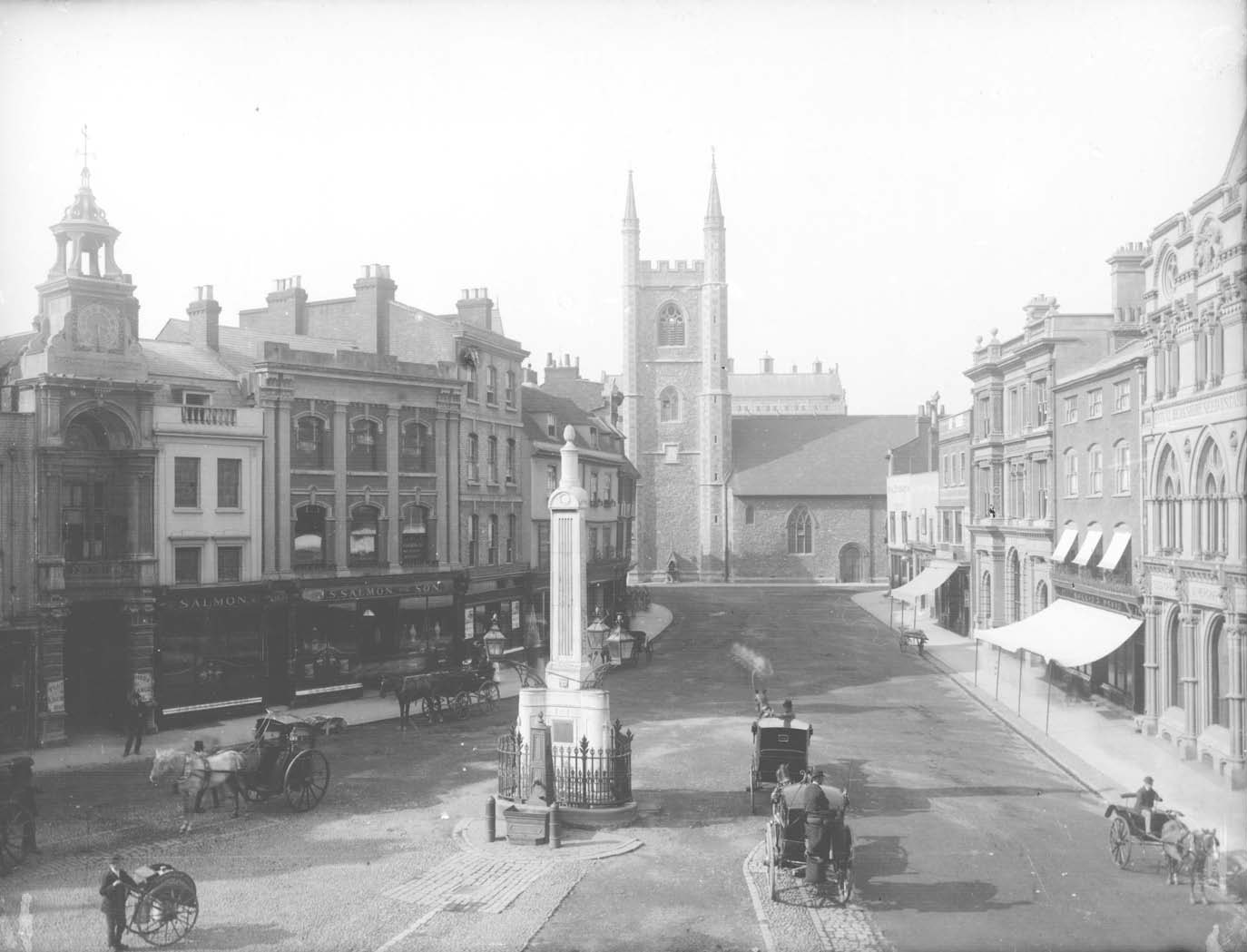
Market Place c. 1875

There was no unveiling ceremony for the monument and the date its lamps were first lit is not recorded, but the stonework was complete by the time Soane inspected it on 3 September 1804. The first recorded mention of the completed monument comes in a report of a dinner hosted on 10 September 1804 by Reading's MP Charles Shaw-Lefevre, reporting that "Mr Monck was remarkably happy in his allusion to a certain newly erected monument, by observing that some gentlemen endeavoured to ingratiate themselves with the Electors by raising monuments of stone, and having their transitory names emblazoned on them in brass, but that his friend raised a more lasting monument, in the breasts and hearts of his constituents". (Note: John Monck was a Whig who eventually succeeded Shaw-Lefevre as one of Reading's two Members of Parliament.) The monument proved immediately controversial; a letter published in the Reading Mercury on 24 September accused Simeon of attempting to "bias the heads of the Borough in his favour by setting up in the market-place a paltry gew-gaw thing without use, or name", and stating that "Some denominate it an obelisk, others a pillar, but among the generality of the inhabitants it is called a p****** post", referring to its use as an object to urinate on. At this time the lamps were not yet in place, and it is possible that the anonymous critic (likely to have been local historian John Man) was not aware that the structure was intended as a lamp-post to illuminate the market, and thought that Simeon had erected the column as a monument to himself. The triangular base of the monument has shallow recesses on each side, the railings surrounding it had not yet been installed, and as the lamps were not yet operational these recesses would have offered a degree of privacy, so it is likely that the anonymous author was correct in asserting that at that time the structure was being used as an impromptu urinal.

During the planning and construction of the monument, Edward Simeon had commissioned what he described as "a variety of experiments ... to produce the most effectual and brilliant light". On 17 January 1805, with the monument now in place, he wrote to George Gilbertson, the Mayor of Reading, advising that:

The preference has to be given to burners containing 2 tiers of lights, 3 above and 4 below, each burner containing 36 threads of cotton, so that the 3 lamps are to give a light equal to 27 of the town lamps – as fully explained in the contract with Mr Owen who lights the town lamps – annual charge for lighting and cleaning the lamps £22-5-6. (Note: About £1,700 in 2025 terms.) I enclose the bank receipt for £1000 (Note: About £75,000 in 2025 terms.) 3% – transferred to the mayor and Corporation. Ordered E. Simeon be presented with the freedom of this borough.

The lamps themselves, along with their supports, were supplied by John Neville of Fleet Street in London. Neville died before being fully paid for the lamps and supports, and Simeon neglected to pay his heirs. On 18 August 1809, following Neville's death, his brother threatened to attach a second plaque to the structure reading "Edward Simeon Esq, of Salvadore House Accepted from William Neville of Fleet Street £20.9s.7d (Note: About £2,000 in 2025 terms) as a small donation towards the expense of erecting his obelisk in commemoration of his name for the work and expenses attending the same performed by his late brother John Neville 416 Strand London". In January 1810, Soane and Simeon each paid half of the outstanding sum to William Neville; Neville returned both cheques, requesting that Simeon donate his share of the sum to a local charity in Reading and that Soane keep his share to do with as he wished.

While some welcomed the erection of the obelisk, others questioned its use and practicality, and were sceptical of Simeon's motives in funding it. Some felt its design was inappropriate, and as early as September 1804 an anonymous correspondent to the Reading Mercury described it as "A spruce pedestal of Wedgwood Ware, where motley arms and tawdry emblems glare", and sarcastically referred to the monument as "the eighth wonder of the world". (Note: The same anonymous correspondent was highly critical of Edward Simeon, accusing him of "taking the Pretty Dears of Reading to the races in his carriage", "importing a cargo of thimbles to be fitted on the fingers of the fair with his own hands", and "opening a warehouse to supply the town with articles of merchandise without the middle-man's profit, to the great loss of the wholesale dealers".) John Man, describing Market Place in his 1810 A Stranger in Reading, wrote that:

Nearly in the centre is a large stone lamp post, if such it may be called, of a triangular form, to correspond, I suppose, with that of the Market-place, but of what order of architecture, I was not able to discover; some of the ornaments however are British, some Roman, and some Egyptian. The base, or pedestal, is, as you may conclude from its shape, divided into three compartments, in one of which, composed of the same kind of gingerbread work I mentioned before, are the town arms, consisting of five maidens' heads placed lozenge wise, the middle one crowned, the others ornamented with garlands of flowers; but I was informed by a great antiquary, who resides here, that this was not correct, the original arms having been five maidens' heads, veiled as nuns, and not in the meretricious dresses they are here represented; as to the middle one being crowned, he says, it was only introduced in compliment to Queen Elizabeth, who was a great benefactress to the town, and consequently might very well now be omitted. In another compartment are the arms of the founder, and in the third an inscription on a brass plate, recording the time of its erection. The three facets, or corners of the base, are ornamented with what I at first mistook for bundles of sticks or fagots, with a woodman's axe thrust into the ends of each of them; but the same learned gentleman assured me, that they were intended to represent to fasces and axes usually carried before the Roman Consuls, in token of their supreme power; if so they are certainly not appropriately introduced here, as the Corporation have only a delegated, not a supreme power; they may whip, but not behead an offender: I would therefore recommend that the axes be taken away, and the fasces left, as being all that is classically necessary to represent that degree of power the Corporation really possess. On the pedestal is raised a triangular shaft, with the facets ornamented in the Egyptian style, and surmounted at the top with something like an acorn. At each corner of the pedestal is a large lamp, for the maintenance whereof, for ever, I am told, the founder has funded a sufficient sum of money in annuities, under the management of the Corporation. It is surrounded by a handsome iron railing, and may, upon the whole, be called a pretty, rather than a correct, design for a lamp post.

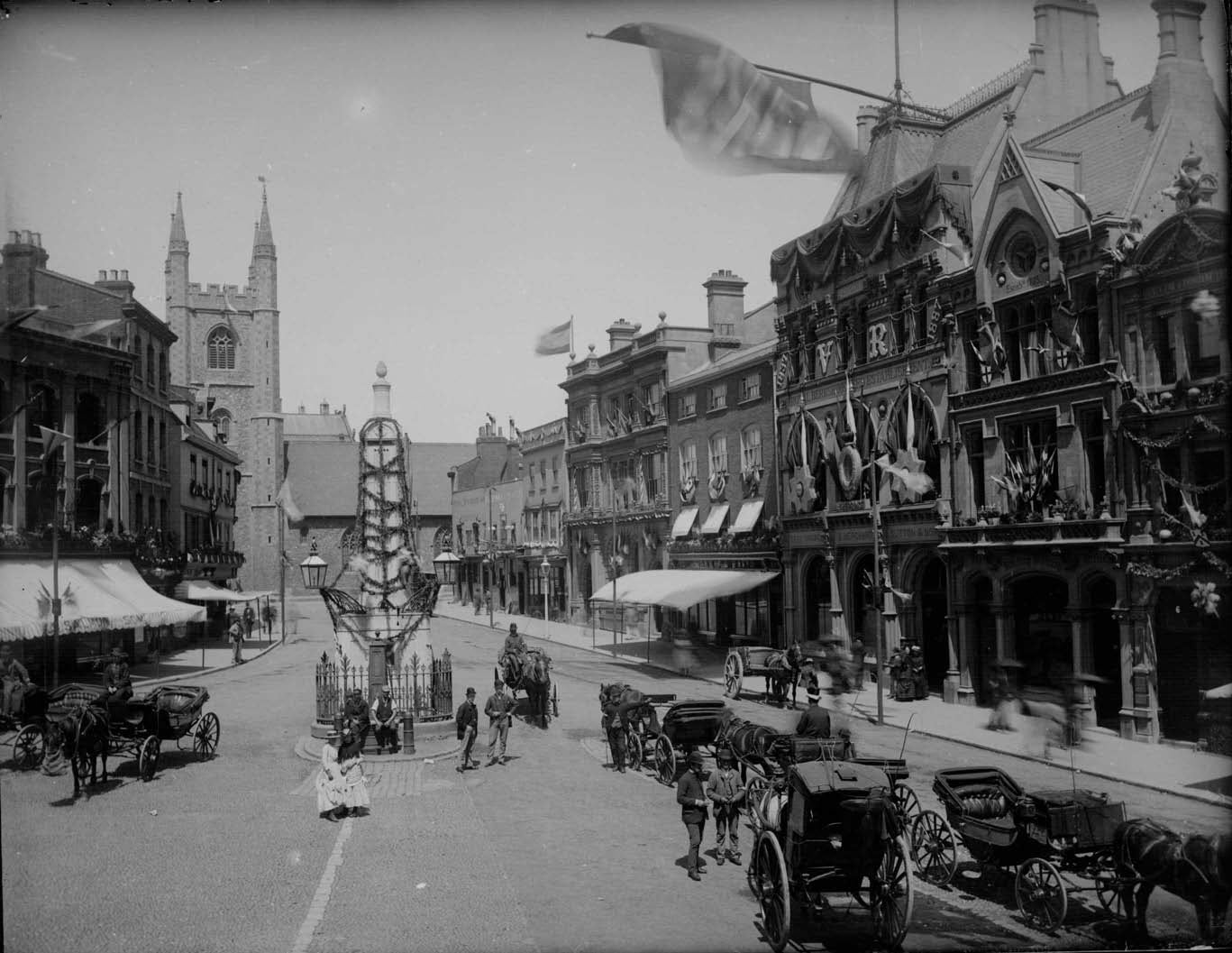
The obelisk decorated for the Golden Jubilee of Queen Victoria, 1887

Although Man disliked the Simeon Monument, he was nonetheless an admirer of Soane, whom he described in the same book as "one of London's first architects ... whose numerous works, in the city [London], and other parts of the kingdom, are convincing proofs of his superior abilities, in a line which has yet to boast of very few masters".

The structure was never officially named, and since its erection has been referred to as the "Simeon Monument", "Soane Monument", "Simeon Obelisk" and "Soane Obelisk" interchangeably. As it was built to illuminate the market and divert the flow of traffic, rather than to officially commemorate any person or event, it is not strictly a monument; as it is a triangular rather than a square structure, it is not technically an obelisk; it was commissioned by Simeon and designed by Soane. Its listing on the National Heritage List for England describes it as the Simeon Monument, as does Soane's biographer Dorothy Stroud, while Adam Sowan's A Mark of Affection (2007) describes it as the "Soane Obelisk", on the grounds that "[Soane's] greater fame has no doubt saved it from demolition, and obelisk ... is what Simeon asked for".

== Later developments ==
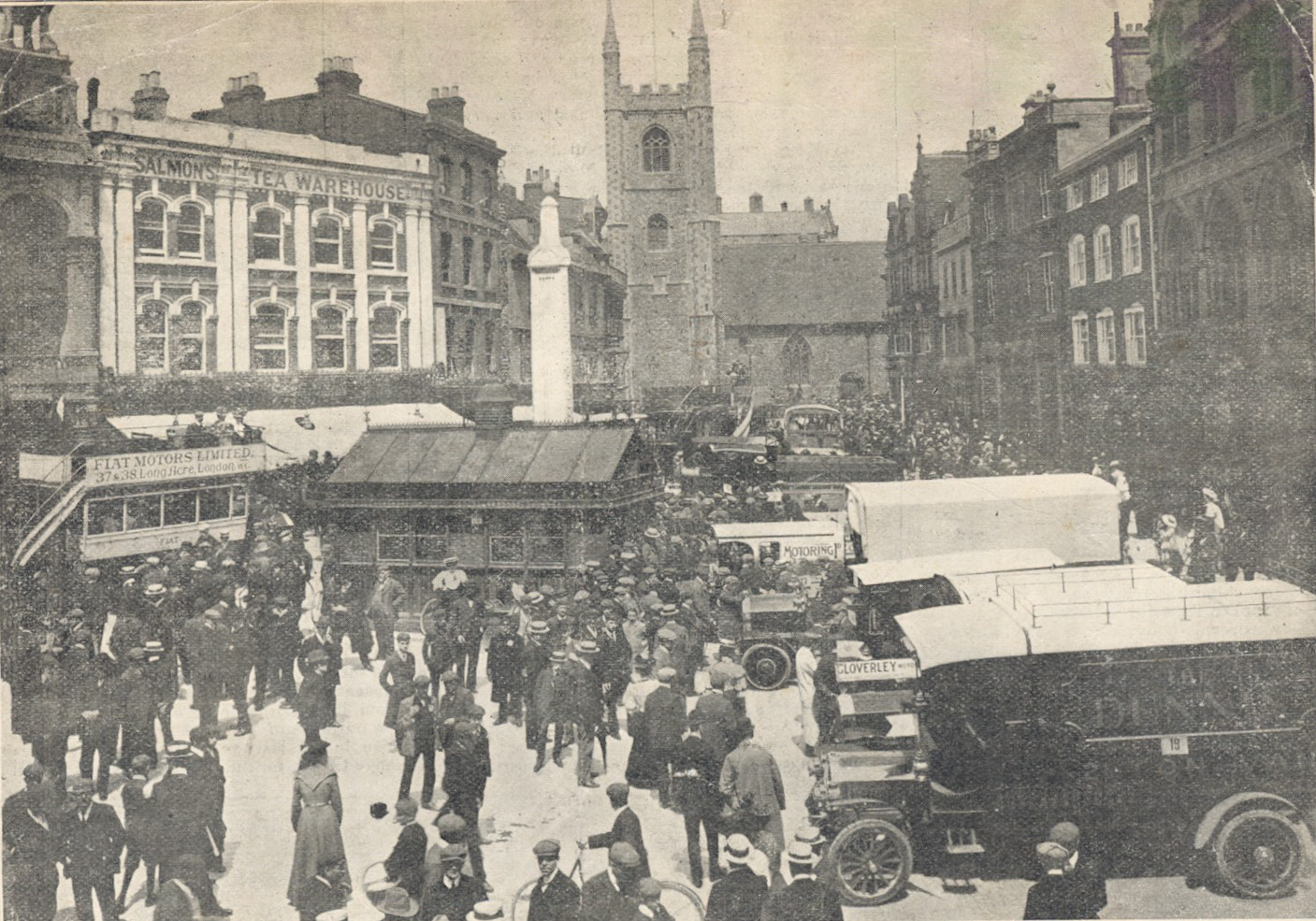
Market Place in 1907; by this time a cabmen's shelter had been built adjacent to the monument

Simeon died on 14 December 1812 in Highgate, "cut off prematurely with a peculiar and distressing malady". He left £4,715 (about £280,000 in 2025 terms) to local causes in his will. The £1,000 annuity at 3% which Simeon had gifted in 1805 for the maintenance of the lamps proved more than was needed to keep the lighting operational following the conversion of the lamps to cheaper gas lighting in the 1840s and was unnecessary after the lamps were removed in 1911. In 1883 Simeon's bequest was transferred to the Official Trustee, with the dividends continuing to be used to pay for gas to the lamps. The surpluses were diverted to other local causes such as illuminating Market Place's clock.

In the mid 1840s, Neville's oil lamps were replaced by cheaper gas lamps, supported by heavier brackets; these in turn were replaced by tall lamp posts affixed to the ground rather than the monument itself in 1890. In 1911 the lamps were shut down and replaced with baskets of flowers. Although the original railings surrounding the structure had been an elaborate design of palmettes alternating with flame palmettes, by 1880 these had been replaced by railings of a more austere and functional design. By 1900 a cabmen's shelter had been constructed next to the monument, later used as a hut the attendants of a car park opened next to the obelisk to serve the market. Underground public toilets were installed adjacent to the obelisk in 1933.

== Dilapidation and renovation ==
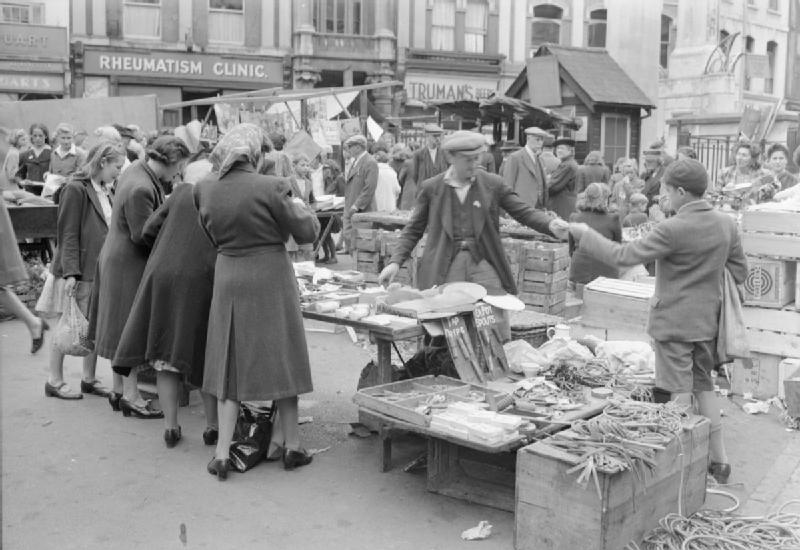
Reading Market during the Second World War. By now the monument (right) was almost completely obscured by surrounding structures

In 1957 the monument was Grade II listed. By this time, the structure was severely dilapidated, and described as "effectively ruined". In 1965 responsibility for the monument was transferred to Reading Borough Council. In 1971 the baskets of flowers hanging from the disused lamp brackets were removed, and electric light bulbs in mock gas lamps installed, while in the mid-1970s the market itself was relocated across the town centre to Hosier Street, near its original site prior to its relocation to Market Place in the 12th century. (Note: Sowan (2007) gives a date of 1975 for the relocation of the market from Market Place to Hosier Street, while Reading Museum gives a date of 1973.) In 1981 the car park was closed, and in 1985 wheelchair-accessible toilets were erected next to the entrance to the underground toilets, clad in Portland stone to blend in with the Simeon Monument. By this time, the monument was dilapidated and had survived demolition mainly through lobbying by admirers of Soane; a 2003 profile of the structure in the Daily Telegraph described this "strange, tripodal stalk of limestone" as "a rather clumsy bit of masonry, revered by Soane fans, ignored by everyone else".

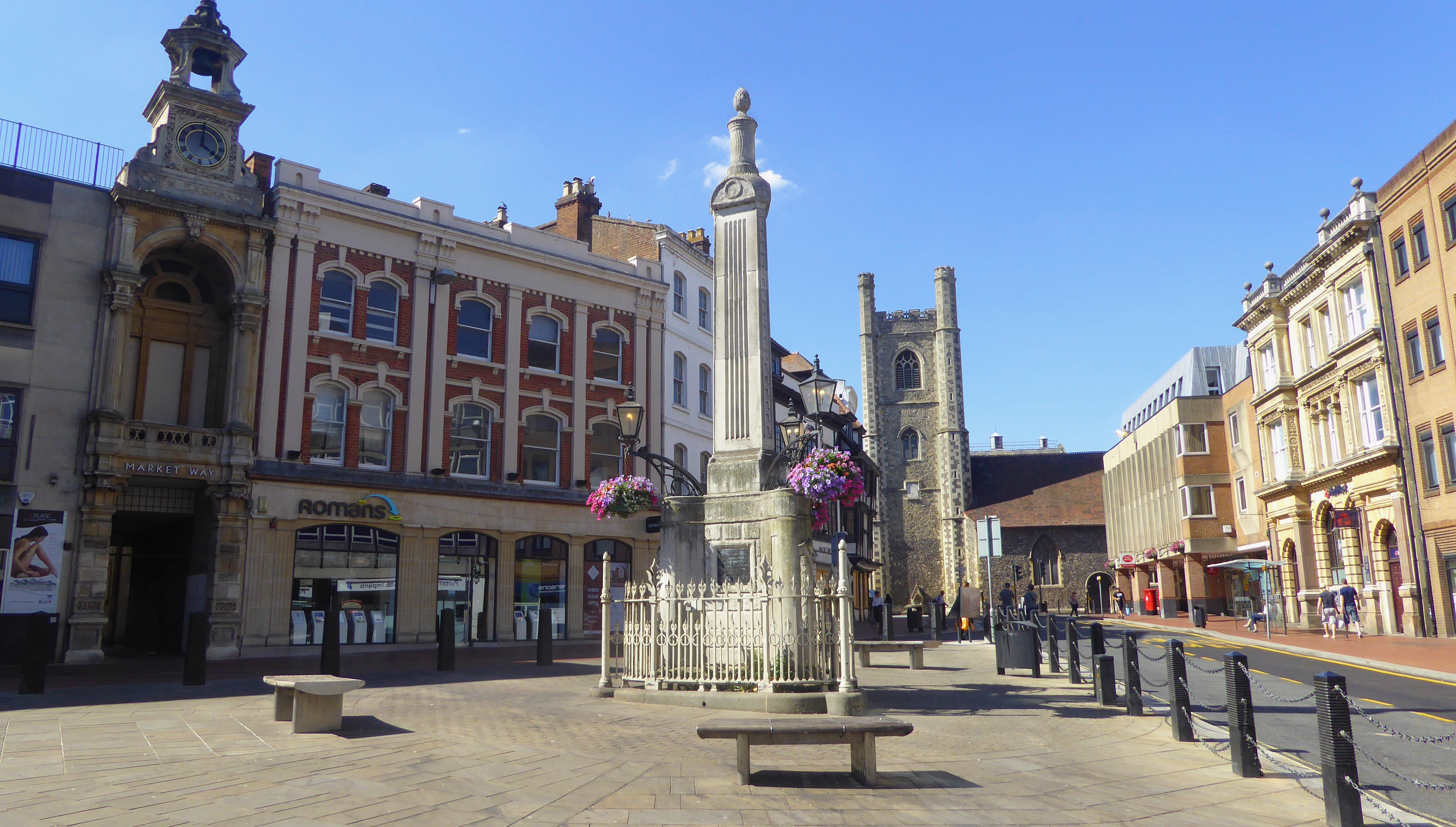
Market Place in 2018, following the landscaping of the former market site and the restoration of the obelisk

Although Soane's designs had become unpopular in the late 19th and early 20th centuries, and most of his buildings had been demolished or significantly altered, following his championing by Nikolaus Pevsner from the 1950s onwards attitudes began to slowly change. In 2005 following pressure from the Soane Monuments Trust, Reading Council agreed to landscape Market Place, removing the now-disused toilets and their airshaft and other structures surrounding the obelisk, and commissioning Julian Harrap to restore the monument itself. Following works costing a total of approximately £60,000 (£15,000 of which was provided by the Soane Monument Trust), (Note: About £110,000 and £27,000 respectively in 2025 terms.) the renovated monument was unveiled on 18 December 2007. By this time, the monument was the last surviving structure in Reading to have been designed by Soane. (Note: A house at 14 St John's Road, Reading, has also been attributed to Soane, but there is no evidence to support the claim.)

== See also ==
- Grade II* listed buildings in Berkshire
