= Nicholas Morse =

British colonial administrator (died 1772)

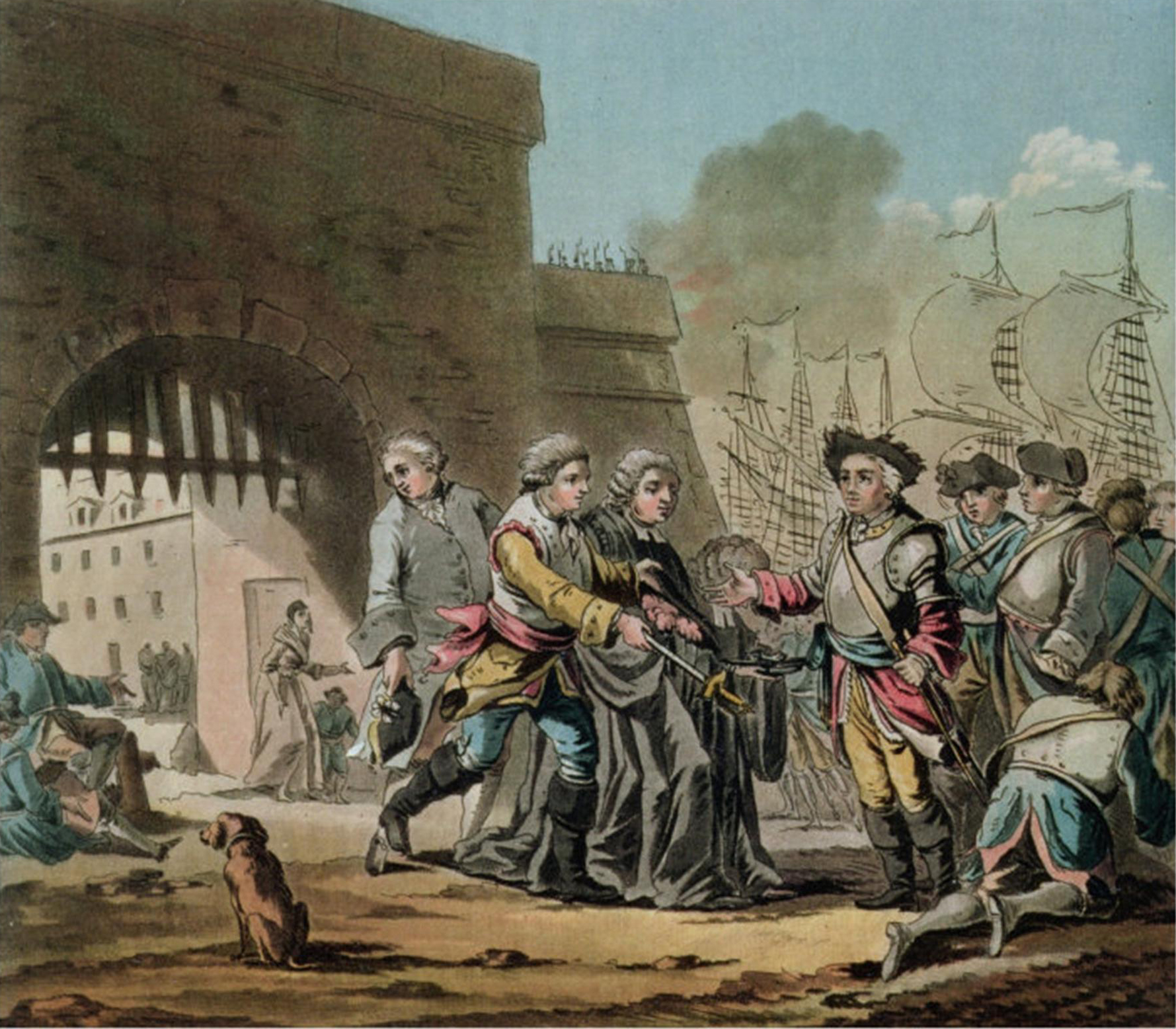
- An illustration of Morse surrendering to Bertrand-François Mahé de La Bourdonnais

President of Fort St. George
- In office 1744–1746
- Preceded by: Richard Benyon
- Succeeded by: John Hinde

Personal details
- Born: Unknown Great Britain
- Died: 28 May 1772 India
- Children: Emilia Morse
- Profession: Colonial administrator

Nicholas Morse (died 28 May 1772) was a British colonial administrator who served as the president of Fort St. George from 1744 to 1746. The great-grandson of English statesman Oliver Cromwell, Morse jointed the British East India Company (EIC) and subsequently rose to a senior position in the EIC, overseeing the Presidency of Fort St. George, which comprised all Company-ruled territories in South India.

Appointed as president of Fort St. George on 11 January 1744, Morse's short tenure was marked by Anglo-French tensions resulting from the ongoing War of the Austrian Succession. On 7 September 1746, a French Navy fleet under the command of Bertrand-François Mahé de La Bourdonnais appeared near Madras and started besieging the settlement. After two days, Morse realised his position was hopeless and agreed to surrender to La Bourdonnais.

La Bourdonnais presented Morse with generous terms of surrender. Fort St. George and EIC warehouses came under French occupation, but the rest of Madras remained under British control. However, in October 1746 a violent storm forced La Bourdonnais's fleet to withdraw to Pondicherry, leaving Joseph François Dupleix in control. Dupleix reneged on La Bourdonnais's terms, imprisoning the EIC garrison and British civilians along with looting Madras.

Morse was succeeded as president of Fort St. George by John Hinde on 10 September 1746, though he served in exile at Fort St. David as Madras remained under French occupation. Fort St. David continued to serve as the seat of the Presidency of Fort St. George until 5 April 1752, even after the French returned Madras to the British in 1749 under the terms of the 1748 Treaty of Aix-la-Chapelle, which ended the war.

Morse had one daughter, Emilia, who married EIC official Henry Vansittart in 1754; after the marriage, she lived in England at Foxley's Manor in Bray, Berkshire. On 28 May 1772, Morse died and was subsequently buried at St Mary's Church, an Anglican church in Madras. Emilia died in 1819 after having seven children with Henry; five sons (Henry, Arthur, Robert, George and Nicholas), and two daughters (Emilia and Sophie).

== See also ==
- List of colonial governors and presidents of Madras Presidency
