= Agnes Catherine Maitland =

Oxford college principal (1850–1906)

Agnes C. Maitland
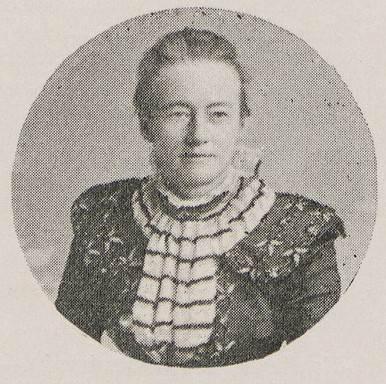
- Agnes Catherine Maitland (1899)
- Born: 12 April 1850; London, England
- Died: 19 August 1906 (aged 56); Oxford, England
- Occupation: educator
- Known for: principal of Somerville College, Oxford

Agnes Catherine Maitland (1850–1906) was the principal of Somerville College, Oxford, England. She did much to gain it full college status within the University of Oxford and to expanding its library. She also wrote books about cookery.

== Life ==
Maitland was born on 12 April 1850 at 12 Gloucester Terrace, Hyde Park, the second daughter of David John Maitland of Chipperkyle, Galloway, and Matilda Leathes Mortlock. Her father settled as a merchant in Liverpool when she was five years old, and she was educated at home there in a Presbyterian atmosphere. In 1875 she published "Elsie" under the name "A. C. M.".

Between 1880 and 1885, Maitland studied cookery at the domestic science training school in Liverpool, and from 1885 to 1889 acted as an examiner in cookery at elementary schools, and of teachers trained by the Northern Union of Schools of Cookery. She was soon recognised as an authority on domestic economy. She wrote several cookery books, of which the most important are The Rudiments of Cookery : a Manual for Use in Schools and Homes (1883), the Afternoon Tea Book (1887) and What Shall We Have for Breakfast? (1889). She also published between 1875 and 1889 some educational novels and tales suitable for young girls.

Maitland was keenly interested in the higher education of women and left Liverpool in 1889 to succeed Madeleine Shaw Lefevre as Principal of Somerville Hall, Oxford. Her experience of public work and talent for administration and organisation proved of value there. Somerville had been founded in 1879 and incorporated as a college in 1881, although it retained the style "Hall" until 1894. Maitland employed an ex-student, Alice Bruce, as her secretary, although she would take on various jobs at Somerville. During Maitland's tenure as Principal, the number of students rose from 35 to 86 and the buildings were extended accordingly. She developed the tutorial system, with a view to making Somerville a genuine college and no mere hall of residence, and she urged the students to take the full degree course, so as to prove their entitlement to degrees, which were still confined to men.

Maitland was something of an autocrat, but handled her staff and students well and showed faith in democratic principles. On her initiative, a proportion of the council were elected by duly qualified old students. A strong liberal in politics, and a broad-minded churchwoman (in spite of her Presbyterian training), she preserved the non-denominational atmosphere at the college.

To Maitland, the college owes the erection of its library of 15,000 volumes, which was opened in 1894 by John Morley. At Morley's suggestion, Helen Taylor presented Somerville with the library of John Stuart Mill, free of conditions.

Maitland died after some two years' illness on 19 August 1906, at 12 Norham Road, Oxford, and was buried in Holywell Cemetery, Oxford.

== Works ==
- Elsie (1875)
- Madge Hilton; or, Left to Themselves (1884) W. Swan Sonnenschein and Co., London
- Rhoda (1885) Remington & Co., London
- The Afternoon Tea Book : How to Make Tea, Coffee, Chocolate, Cakes, Scones, Rolls, Sandwiches, Cooling Drinks, and Ices (1887) John Hogg, London OCLC 527425870
- The Cookery Primer. For School and Home Use (1888) OCLC 316581381
- Nellie O'Neil, or, Our Summer Time (1889) Thomas Nelson and Sons OCLC 70658196
- A Woman's Victory (1892) William Stevens, London OCLC 266970690
- The Due Recognition of Women by the University of Oxford (1896) Somerville College, Oxford OCLC 55806447
- With Margaret Aylmer (1899) Mothers' Meetings and Their Advantages : In Three Letters, William Macintosh, London OCLC 80732885
- What Shall We Have for Breakfast?, or, Everybody's Breakfast Book (1901) John Hogg, London

== Sources ==
- Jones, Enid Huws. "Maitland, Agnes Catherine (1849–1906)". Oxford Dictionary of National Biography (online ed.). Oxford University Press. doi:10.1093/ref:odnb/34836. (Subscription, Wikipedia Library access or UK public library membership required.)

Preceded by Madeleine Shaw-Lefèvre	Principal; Somerville College, Oxford; 1889-1906	Succeeded by Emily Penrose
