= Robert Dalzell (British Army officer, born 1662) =

Scottish army officer (1660s–1758)

General Robert Dalzell
- Born: 1661 or 1662
- Died: 14 October 1758 (aged 96); Craig's Court, London
- Burial place: St Martin-in-the-Fields, London
- Occupations: General, treasurer
- Spouse: Anna Maria Gibson
- Children: 1

General Robert Dalzell (sometimes spelt Dalziel; 1661 or 1662 – 14 October 1758) was a Scottish officer with a long career in the British Army. He saw action in many of the Duke of Marlborough's campaigns during the War of the Spanish Succession. For forty years, he worked for the Sun Fire Office, one of the first insurance companies in London to protect against the risk of fire.

== Military and professional career ==
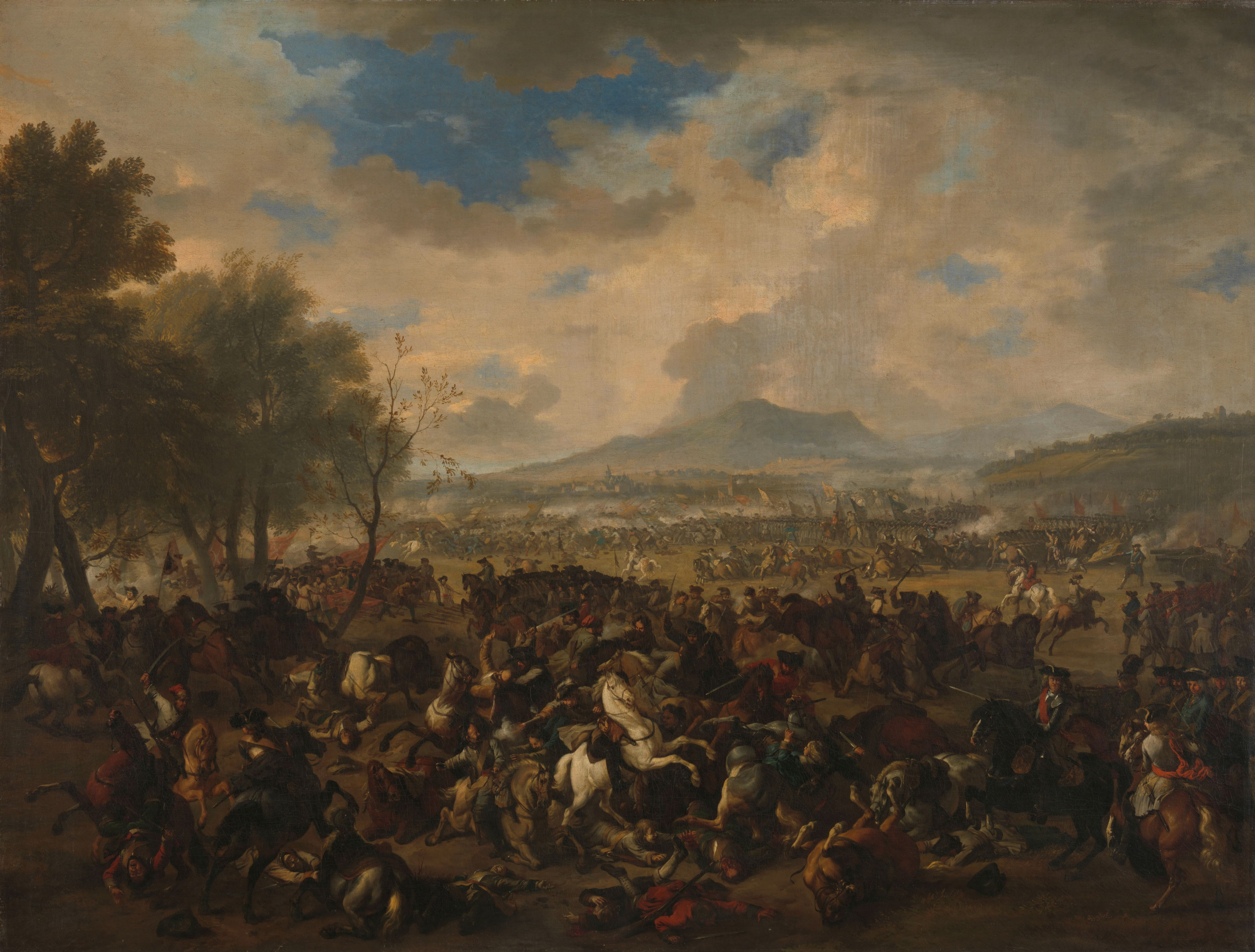
The Battle of Ramillies, which Dalzell fought in

Robert Dalzell was born in 1661 or 1662. He may have been descended from the earls of Carnwath, Scottish peers. His military career started in January 1682 when he served as an ensign in the Scottish foot company of his relative Sir John Dalzell. The unit became the Royal Scots Fusiliers in 1688 when it joined England. Dalzell was promoted to captain in 1694 in the 28th (North Gloucestershire) Regiment of Foot led by Sir John Gibson. While serving in the regiment, he met Anna Maria Gibson, Gibson's daughter. She was apparently "enamoured" with Dalzell and they conceived a child out of wedlock. Sir John attempted a court martial, but after Dalzell agreed to marry his daughter, he was promoted instead. The marriage occurred sometime before 1698.

The 28th regiment served in Flanders, the West Indies, and Newfoundland. It was disbanded in 1698 and re-formed in 1702. During that latter year, Dalzell received the appointment of town-major of the port city of Portsmouth, which earned him £70 a year. He sold his colonelcy in 1704 and was promoted to lieutenant-colonel. Under his command, the regiment joined the Duke of Marlborough's forces and participated in multiple campaigns during the War of the Spanish Succession. These included the 1706 Battle of Ramillies and 1707 Battle of Almansa. Almansa was catastrophic for the regiment and Dalzell returned to England to reform it, going back to Spain in 1708. The following year, he was appointed as colonel of a new regiment there which was discontinued in 1712. He received further promotions over the next few years, advancing to brigadier-general in 1711 and then major-general in 1715.

In 1720, Dalzell became treasurer of the Sun Fire Office, one of the first insurance companies in London to protect against the risk of fire. He had joined the organisation as part of a group of Scottish investors who took ownership after the South Sea Bubble. He held that position and then served as chairman for nearly forty years and lived at its offices at Craig's Court, Charing Cross. He worked for the company while concurrently serving in the military.

In 1739, Dalzell was promoted to colonel of 38th Regiment of Foot, and then to general in 1745. Governor William Mathew of the British Leeward Islands complained in 1745 about the state of his regiment's clothing, saying that the men "instead of being tolerably clothed are in rags". Dalzell strongly defended his regiment to a Board of General Officers and was eventually accused of stealing funds and ordered to issue a refund. Dalzell was promoted to be general of foot on 24 March 1747. He retired from the military in 1749.

== Personal life and death ==
Dalzell's son Gibson Dalzell was a prominent resident on the island of Jamaica. Dalzell met his mixed race granddaughter, Frances, for the first time when she moved to Britain from Jamaica in the late 1730s. His wife's aunt paid her school fees. Dalzell was able to persuade his son to return to England soon after, reuniting with him in 1746. Robert arranged for Gibson to become director of Sun Fire Office that same year, as well as purchased for him a lease of twenty-one years to a London coal meter, an honorific but profitable position.

Dalzell died at Craig's Court on 14 October 1758, at the age of 96. He had initially wished to be buried at Westminster Abbey, but the expense of it changed his mind, so he was buried at St Martin-in-the-Fields. In his will, he left his grandson Robert substantial land in Berkshire and Hampshire. He left a further £1,500 to Frances for "separate use" from her husband.

Military offices
Preceded by Charles Spencer, 3rd Duke of Marlborough	Colonel of 38th Regiment of Foot; 1739–1750	Succeeded by Richard Philipps
