= Robert Vansittart (judge) =

English jurist, antiquarian and rake

Robert Vansittart (28 December 1728 – 31 January 1789) was an English jurist, antiquarian and rake.

== Life ==
The son of Arthur Vansittart and Martha, daughter of Sir John Stonhouse, 3rd Baronet, and elder brother of Henry Vansittart, he grew up in Shottesbrooke in Berkshire. He was educated at Winchester College and Trinity College, Oxford, becoming a fellow of All Souls College, Oxford in 1748. In 1753, he was called to the bar at the Inner Temple. He held a number of minor judicial appointments, including that of recorder of Maidenhead in 1758 and Newbury in 1764, before being appointed Regius Professor of civil law at Oxford in 1767, a chair he held until his death. He published a number of antiquarian works in his spare time.

He was a close acquaintance of Samuel Johnson, William Hogarth and Paul Whitehead and a participant in the debauchery of the Hellfire Club.

He died, unmarried, in Oxford.

A character in one of Johann Wolfgang von Goethe's comedies is named for him following a meeting in Italy.

== Bibliography ==
- Carlyle, E. I., rev. Robert Brown (2005) "Vansittart, Robert (1728–1789)", Oxford Dictionary of National Biography, Oxford University Press, online edn, Oct 2005, accessed 18 Aug 2007
- "Vansittart, Robert" . Dictionary of National Biography. London: Smith, Elder & Co. 1885–1900.
