= Charles Simeon =

English evangelical clergyman

The Reverend Charles Simeon
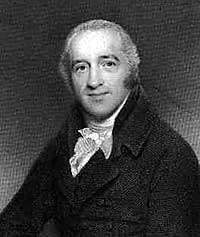
- Portrait of Simeon
- Born: 24 September 1759; Reading, Berkshire, England
- Died: 13 November 1836 (aged 77)
- Relatives: Sir John Simeon, 1st Baronet (brother); Edward Simeon (brother); Sir Richard Simeon, 2nd Baronet (nephew); Sir John Simeon, 3rd Baronet (great-nephew)

Charles Simeon (24 September 1759 – 13 November 1836) was an English evangelical Anglican cleric and biblical commentator who led the evangelical 'Low Church' movement, in reaction to the liturgically and episcopally oriented 'High Church' party.

== Life and career ==
He was born at Reading, Berkshire, in 1759 and baptised at St Laurence's parish church on 24 October of that year. He was the fourth and youngest son of Richard Simeon (died 1784) and Elizabeth Hutton. His eldest brother, named Richard after their father, died early. His second brother, John, entered the legal profession, became an MP and received a baronetcy. The third brother, Edward Simeon, was a director of the Bank of England.

Simeon was educated at Eton College and King's College, Cambridge. As an undergraduate at King's from 1779, brought up in the high church tradition, he read The Whole Duty of Man and then a work by Thomas Wilson on the sacrament, and taking communion at Easter experienced a Christian conversion. In 1782 he became a fellow of King's College and was ordained a deacon. He graduated B.A. in 1783 and, in the same year, was ordained a priest of the Church of England. He began his ministry as deputy to Christopher Atkinson (1754–1795) at St Edward King and Martyr, Cambridge. Atkinson introduced him to John Venn and Simeon then met Henry Venn, confirming his evangelical and Calvinist views.

Simeon received the living of Holy Trinity Church, Cambridge, in 1783. The appointment, technically a curacy, followed the death of the Rev. Henry Therond. Simeon's father intervened with James Yorke, the Bishop of Ely, and he was appointed, under the age of 23, as a curate-in-charge for the bishop. He was at first unpopular, and indeed the congregation would have preferred John Hammond (died 1830), who had been curate there, and became lecturer. Services were disrupted, and he was insulted in the streets. Simeon remained there for the rest of his life, eventually with a crowded church.

Simeon died, unmarried, on 13 November 1836, and was buried on 19 November in King's College Chapel, Cambridge. His memorial by Humphrey Hopper in Holy Trinity, Cambridge, was described by architectural critic Nikolaus Pevsner as an "epitaph in Gothic forms."

== Influence ==
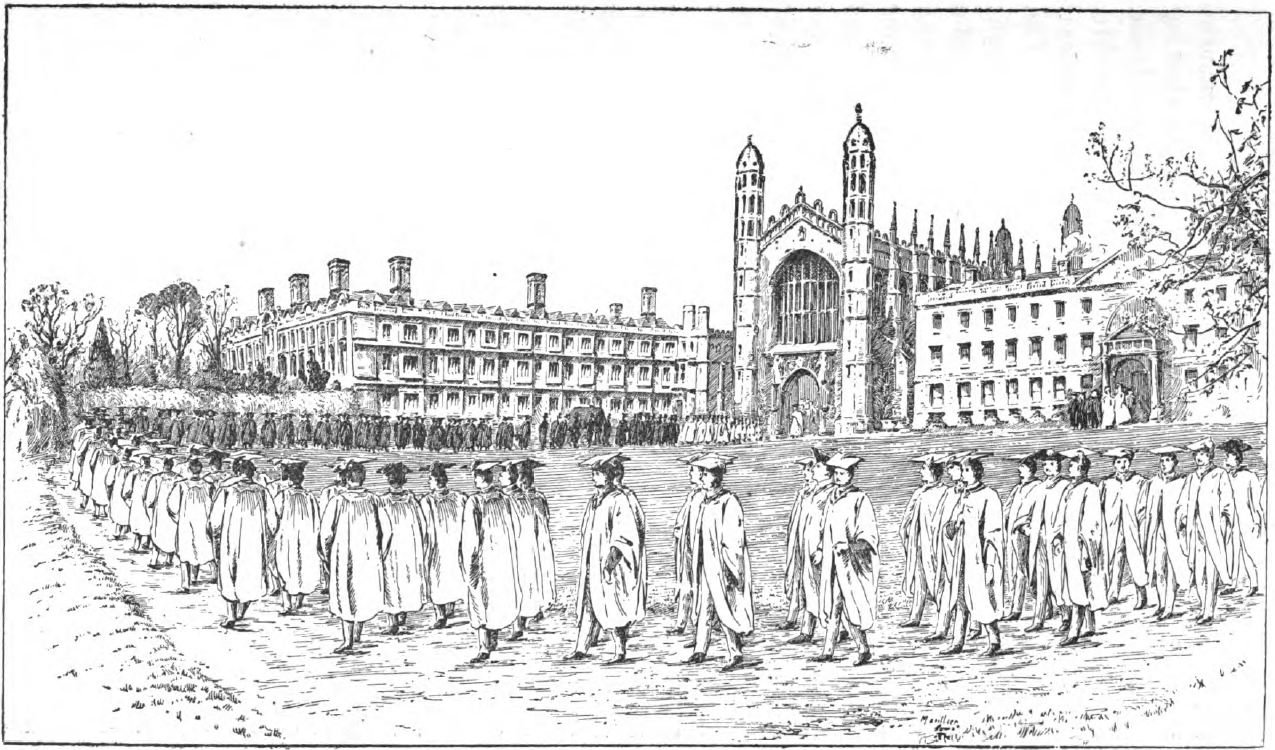
Simeon's funeral at King's College, Cambridge on 19 November 1836 from Memoirs of a King's College Chorister (1899)

Simeon gained influence among the undergraduates of the university. He became a leader among evangelical churchmen, and was one of the founders of the Church Missionary Society in 1799. He also helped found the London Society for Promoting Christianity Amongst the Jews (now known as the Church's Ministry Among Jewish People or CMJ) in 1809, and acted as adviser to the British East India Company in the choice of chaplains for India.

According to the historian Thomas Macaulay, Simeon's "authority and influence … extended from Cambridge to the most remote corners of England ... his real sway in the Church was far greater than that of any primate."

== Works ==
In 1792, Simeon read An Essay on the Composition of a Sermon by the French Reformed minister Jean Claude. Simeon found that their principles were identical and used the essay as the basis for his lectures on sermon composition. Claude's essay also inspired Simeon to make clear his own theological position. He published hundreds of sermons and sermon outlines (called "sermon skeletons"), still in print, that to some were an invitation to clerical plagiarism. His chief work is a commentary on the whole Bible, entitled Horae homileticae (London).

== Legacy ==
Simeon is remembered in the Church of England with a lesser festival and in the Anglican Church of Canada, as well as the Anglican Church in North America, with a Commemoration on 13 November. He is commemorated in the Episcopal Church of the United States with a Lesser Feast on 12 November.

He established a trust for the purpose of acquiring church patronage to perpetuate evangelical clergy in Church of England parishes. It arose from the bequest of John Thornton, who died in 1813, of ten advowsons, left to a trust, of which Simeon was one of the trustees. Simeon expanded the group of livings with money he had inherited. The Simeon's Trustees, of what was called the Simeon Fund, are responsible for the patronage (or a share of the patronage) in over 160 Church of England parishes.

There is also a Charles Simeon Trust, founded in 2001, and the Charles Simeon Institute, established in 2014, that operate in the United States and Canada.

== Notes ==
Attribution

== Sources ==
- Memoirs of Charles Simeon, with a selection from his writings and correspondence, edited by the Rev. W. Carus (3rd ed., 1848).
- W. D. Balda, Spheres of Influence: Simeon's Trust and its implications for evangelical patronage, Cambridge University dissertation (1981).
- Derek Prime, Charles Simeon: An Ordinary Pastor of Extraordinary Influence (Leominster, DayOne, 2011) (History Today).
- Andrew Atherstone, Charles Simeon on "The Excellency of the Liturgy" (Norwich, Hymns Ancient and Modern, 2011) (Alcuin/GROW liturgical study, 72).
- Hugh Evan Hopkins. Charles Simeon of Cambridge (Hodder, 1977)(Now published by Wipf & Stock, USA)
- H C G Moule. Charles Simeon (Methuen, 1892)(now published by Christian Focus Publications, Scotland)
