= John Shaw Lefevre =

British barrister, Whig politician and civil servant

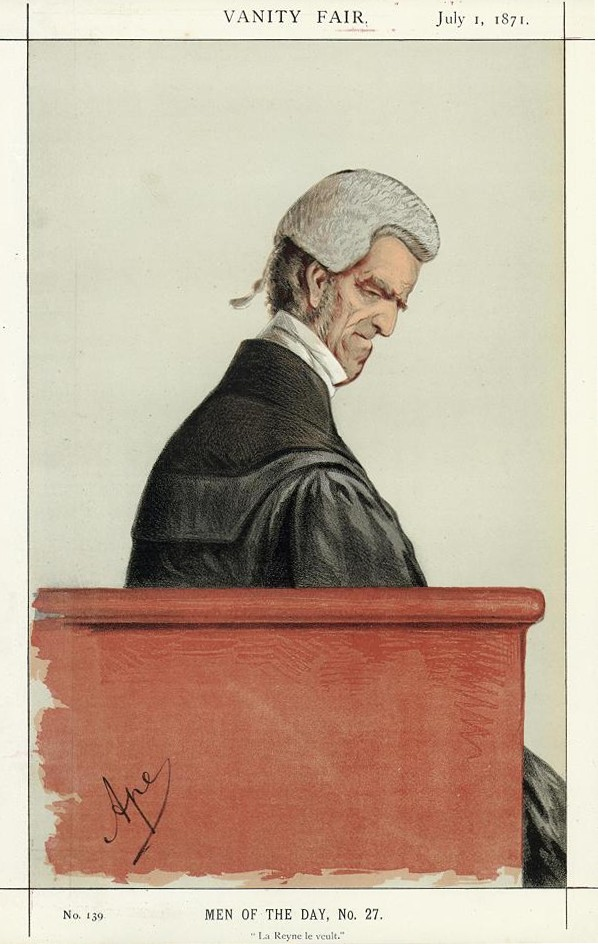
"La Reyne le veult" Shaw Lefevre as caricatured by Ape (Carlo Pellegrini) in Vanity Fair, July 1871

Sir John George Shaw Lefevre KCB (24 January 1797 – 20 August 1879) was a British barrister, Whig politician and civil servant.

== Career ==
Shaw Lefevre was the son of Charles Shaw Lefevre by his wife Helen, daughter of John Lefevre. Charles Shaw-Lefevre, 1st Viscount Eversley, was his elder brother. He was educated at Trinity College, Cambridge, where he was Senior Wrangler in 1818, and was called to the Bar, Inner Temple. He was elected a Fellow of the Royal Society in 1820.

He was returned to Parliament for Petersfield in December 1832, but was unseated on petition in March 1833. He served under Lord Grey as Under-Secretary of State for War and the Colonies in 1834. The latter year Shaw Lefevre was appointed a Poor Law Commissioner after the passing of the Poor Law Amendment Act 1834, which he remained until 1841. Between 1856 and 1875 he served as Clerk of the Parliaments. He also helped found the University of London and served as its Vice-Chancellor for many years. He was made a Knight Commander of the Order of the Bath (KCB) in 1857 for his public services.

== Marriage and family ==
Shaw Lefevre married Rachel Emily, daughter of Ichabod Wright, in 1824. They had one surviving son, George, who became a prominent politician and was ennobled as Baron Eversley, and five daughters. One daughter, Madeleine Shaw-Lefevre, was the first Principal of Somerville Hall; another daughter, Rachel, married Arthur Hamilton-Gordon, son of the Prime Minister the 4th Earl of Aberdeen.

Shaw Lefevre died in August 1879, aged 82. His wife lived for six more years before dying in February 1885.

== Legacy ==
The Lefevre Peninsula in South Australia, was named by Governor John Hindmarsh on 3 June 1837 after Shaw Lefevre, who was one of South Australia's Colonisation Commissioners.

In 1880, Lady Shaw Lefevre presented his library of Russian books to the University of London Library.

Parliament of the United Kingdom
Preceded by Sir William Jolliffe; Hylton Jolliffe	Member of Parliament for Petersfield; 1832–1833	Succeeded by Sir William Jolliffe
Political offices
Preceded by Viscount Howick	Under-Secretary of State for War and the Colonies; 1834	Succeeded by Sir George Grey
Academic offices
Preceded by Sir John Lubbock	Vice-Chancellor of University of London; 1842–1862	Succeeded by George Grote
Church of England titles
Preceded by New post	Second Church Estates Commissioner; 1850–1858	Succeeded by The Viscount Eversley
Government offices
Preceded by George Henry Rose	Clerk of the Parliaments; 1855–1875	Succeeded by William Rose
