= Frances Duff =

British heiress (1729–1778)

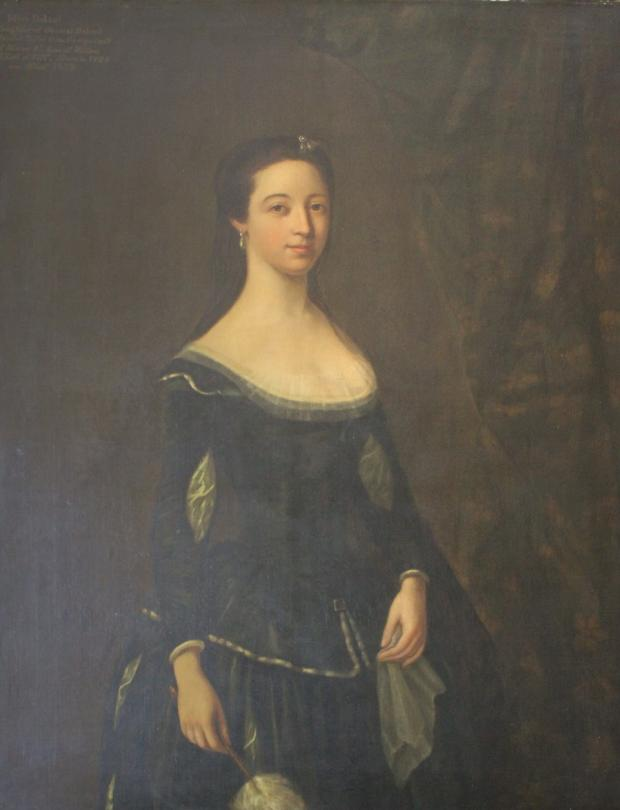
- c. 1750 portrait
- Born: Frances Dalzell; 16 June 1729; Kingston, Colony of Jamaica
- Died: July 1778 (aged 49); London, Kingdom of Great Britain
- Burial place: St. Martin-in-the-Fields, London, Kingdom of Great Britain
- Occupations: Landowner and heiress
- Spouse: George Duff (m. 1757; died 1778)
- Children: 5

Frances Duff (née Dalzell; 16 June 1729 – July 1778) was a British heiress and plantation owner of mixed-race descent. She was born in Kingston, Jamaica, the daughter of a white businessman and a mulatto heiress who had been freed from slavery before Frances's birth. When she was nine years old, her mother successfully petitioned the House of Assembly of Jamaica to grant her and her daughter increased civil liberties. Frances was sent to a boarding school in England, and after her education she remained in England for the rest of her life.

In the mid-1750s, when she was in her 20s, Dalzell inherited estates and slaves from her father, making her a wealthy woman. Five years later, her case would be specifically cited by the Jamaican Assembly in its new law limiting bequests for mixed-race people. She married George Duff, a younger son of the 1st Earl Fife. Historians believe that Dalzell was the only 18th-century heiress of mixed-race ancestry to marry into the British aristocracy.

== Early life ==
=== Family background ===
Frances Dalzell was born in Kingston, Jamaica, to Gibson Dalzell, a businessman originally from Portsmouth, England. He was a son of the highly decorated Scottish army officer Robert Dalzell. Her mother Susanna Augier, was a mixed race (mulatto) natural daughter of a white man and an enslaved black woman, born into slavery because of her mother's status. Such interracial relationships were common in Jamaica, where white men outnumbered white women two to one, and had economic and social power over most black women. Uncommonly for the era, John Augier provided in his will to free his five mixed-race children – including Susanna – at his death. In addition he bequeathed parcels of his estate to each of them. Thus she became free.

Still, prospects were limited on the island for freed people of black descent, especially women. Soon after, Susanna entered into a relationship with a rich merchant named Peter Caillard, with whom she had three children, including girls. Caillard died in 1728 and bequeathed to Susanna the majority of his wealth, including his Jamaican properties valued at £26,150.8.10. It was an astonishing turn of events for a woman born into slavery. The historian Miranda Kaufman notes it as being "one of the most substantial legacies ever bequeathed to a mixed-heritage person in colonial Jamaica".

=== Birth and education ===
Soon after Caillard's death, Susanna became the mistress of Gibson Dalzell, and gave birth to his daughter Frances on 16 June 1729; a son, Robert, was born four years later. Gibson held many prominent positions on the island and was well known among its inhabitants. They lived in a Kingston townhouse Susanna had inherited from Caillard.

When Frances was nine years old, Susanna successfully persuaded the House of Assembly of Jamaica to pass a private act granting her and her daughters increased civil liberties with "the same Rights and Privileges [as] English Subjects born of White Parents". The act, which passed on 19 July 1738, also included any of their children born in Jamaica to white men, and would allow them all to live as "free and natural born subjects of the crown of Great Britain". Such a request was necessary, as the Assembly had five years earlier passed a law limiting rights for anyone descended too closely from a black ancestor. Susanna was the first woman and only the second person to submit such a request to the Assembly. In her successful petition, she emphasised her fortune and the Church of England education being given to her daughters; her ownership of several slaves and connection to Gibson Dalzell also likely helped.

Shortly after her change in status, Susanna sent Frances to a boarding school in Great Britain for her education. This was common for colonial families wishing to give their children, especially boys, a superior – and more "polite" – education than was available in Jamaica. There, Frances met her paternal grandfather, Colonel Robert Dalzell. His sister, her great aunt, paid the girl's school fees. Her family stayed behind in Jamaica; the colonel eventually persuaded his son Gibson to return to Britain by hinting that Frances would receive an inheritance from him. Frances was subsequently reunited with her father in 1746, after a six-year separation. Upon Gibson's return, his father arranged for him to become director of the Sun Fire Office, an insurance company based in London. Her younger brother eventually joined them and they lived in Mayfair, an affluent part of the city. Gibson also leased a country residence in Hertfordshire. The historian Daniel Livesay characterises the Dalzells' move to Britain as an example of mixed-race families seeking to form "new, legitimate, metropolitan households that hoped to sidestep African ancestry altogether".

Susanna stayed behind in Jamaica, along with her Caillard children. She and Gibson had never married, but he left her with ample financial support and instructed his attorneys to take money out of his estate in the event she needed more funds. Despite the distance, Frances maintained communication with her mother and promised to visit her in Jamaica one day. However, this was prevented by the ongoing Seven Years' War (1756–1763). At one point Susanna sent her daughter a gold necklace. Meanwhile, in Britain, Frances's clothing bills indicate that Gibson lavishly dressed his daughter in the latest styles. He also confided in her; Frances observed the many decisions that went into management of his Jamaican properties. His trust in her was such that he gave her a copy of his will when she was seventeen.

== Inheritance and estate management ==
As an absentee owner, Gibson Dalzell depended on attorneys to manage his Jamaican interests. He invested funds to improve productivity through the acquisition of slaves, mills, and machinery. The Dalzell properties – which produced a combination of sugar, coffee, ginger, and rum – were relatively profitable as the demand for sugar grew in Britain and North America. Gibson held his directorship of the Sun Fire Office until his death in 1755 or 1756. His will divided his estates between his two children, which included 133 enslaved people and hundreds of acres (hectares) in Portland and Saint Mary. Gibson also left his daughter with fifty shares from the Sun Fire Office and other sources of money. Susanna died suddenly in 1757 and was buried in Kingston; she left her children with seven slaves, livestock, and various possessions. However, much of Susanna's wealth went to her Augier relatives, as she had neglected to alter the will in her children's favour.

Under Jamaican law, Frances was considered a mulatto. Like most contemporaries of mixed heritage who inherited wealth, she did not oppose being a slaveholder and worked to maintain this status. She encountered significant difficulties managing her properties. As a woman, she had to doubly prove her ability to resolve them in a time of gendered discrimination. After her father's death, she took over management of his Lucky Hill estate in Saint Mary. Gibson had told her that his friend Charles Price, the owner of a large nearby plantation, would be his executor. However, his will did not name any trustees to carry out his wishes. Frances consequently applied for probate and was granted administrative control of her properties on 2 July 1756. This was in opposition to her uncle, Alexander Hamilton, whom she blamed for drafting the poorly written terms of the will which normally would have included two executors; she also accused him of appointing himself as trustee against her wishes.

Now in control of the estate, she instructed her attorney Thomas Bontein to compile a careful accounting of every item she owned, as well as detailed accounts of every transaction made; she also asked him to keep her apprised of all events pertaining to the estate. She went through all of her father's documents and continued his correspondence with the men he had been doing business with. She named Price and Bontein as her agents, but was also an active participant in the management of her properties: for instance, she dictated what crops would be grown and ordered the purchase of new slaves. Income was not always consistent; in 1758, a ship carrying thirty hogshead of sugar from Lucky Hill sunk at sea, a misfortune compounded by the fact that the cargo had not been insured.

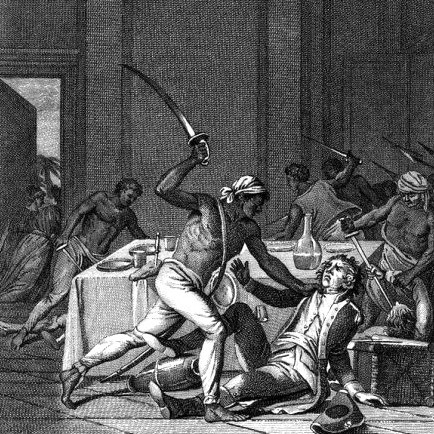
1800 engraving of Tacky's Revolt by François-Anne David

Further troubles arose in 1760 when the slave rebellion known as Tacky's Revolt began in Jamaica. White authorities soon ended the rebellion, and legislation was passed which placed further limitations on people of mixed heritage like Frances and her brother. The Jamaican Assembly, blaming those with mixed ancestry for inciting the revolt, passed a law in 1761 capping this group's inheritance at £1,200. When subsequently challenged by the London-based Board of Trade, the Assembly specifically cited the Caillard and Dalzell wills in their reasoning. She had continued difficulties with her Jamaican properties throughout her tenure, contending with troublesome tenants, debts, and disputes regarding her mother's inheritance.

== Marriage ==
A large inheritance allowed Frances and her brother Robert to arrange advantageous marriages for themselves – she married into the Scottish nobility and he married the daughter of a Member of Parliament. She likely was aggressive in pursuing their inheritance out of a motivation for such connections. When Frances was twenty-seven years old, she met the Hon. George Duff, an officer in the 10th Regiment of Dragoons. Seven years her junior, he was the fourth son of William Duff, Lord Braco (soon to be 1st Earl Fife), and destined to inherit estates valued at £1,000 a year. George's letters show his ardour for Frances, writing in one that such "was the power you have over me you can use me ill or well as you please". Her correspondence shows fondness though perhaps less passion. They married on 7 April 1757 at St. Martin-in-the-Fields, London.

The Duffs had been unhappy to learn of the engagement and threatened to disinherit their son; they never directly explained their reason, but it was perhaps due to Frances's illegitimate birth or mixed race status. However, a portrait of Frances shows her as having light skin. If it is accurate, contemporaries may have assumed that she was white. The historian Miranda Kaufman speculates that it was perhaps this fact, along with Dalzell's education and wealth, that improved the opinion of George's parents by February 1757. Lord Braco approved the match and gave his son an annual allowance of £200; he also confirmed that Frances's grandfather planned to leave her with an inheritance. As was typical for heiresses, the marriage papers protected Frances's assets and ensured she would maintain control of her Jamaican properties and dictate who would inherit them.

Upon her grandfather's death in 1758, Frances received a further £1,500 that was placed in a trust. After her marriage, Frances continued as an absentee landlord of the Jamaica properties. Her father had left debts, which the couple paid in 1759 by selling some of the father's shares as well as portions of her grandfather's legacy.

== Issue ==
Although the Duffs were a Scottish family, Frances and George chose to live in London, which they felt offered more opportunities for amusement and socialisation. Their first child, William Robert, was born in July 1758 but died the following year. By 1766, they had four more children – James (“Jem”); fraternal twins George and Jane Dorothea; and Frances (“Fanny”). The elder Frances noted in one letter that "the children... give us many agreeable hours, indeed... their company makes us very happy". Jem suffered from a mental illness; From the age of thirteen, he was committed to an insane asylum in Fulham and would outlive all his siblings. The family lived in Putney and then at Hanwell Heath in Ealing, apparently for the elder George's health.

== Death and legacy ==
In July 1778, Frances Duff died in London at the age of forty-nine and was buried at St. Martin-in-the-Fields. She named George as the executor of her will, opting to leave small sums of money to their daughters and the bulk of her Jamaican properties to their younger son George. Another copy of her will was apparently found eight years later, as described in a letter by her brother-in-law James Duff, 2nd Earl Fife. Her daughters Fanny and Jane Dorothea never married, perhaps due to their comparative lack of inheritance from Frances's will. George Duff lived forty more years than his wife, dying on 23 November 1818. He never remarried.

The historian Miranda Kaufman identified eighteen examples of heiresses of African heritage who married in Britain during the 18th-century. She noted that Frances Dalzell was the only one to marry into the aristocracy, as the others are only documented to have married men in lower classes – such as merchants, surgeons, and lawyers. After Frances's death, stories that mirrored portions of her life began to appear in the popular press. In the 1790s, the subject of mixed race people emigrating to Britain received much interest among the public and appeared in sentimental stories. A character in Jane Austen's unfinished novel Sanditon (1817) is able to overcome views of her mixed ancestry and class through possession of a large fortune, and is even considered a suitable match for a baronet. There are also notable parallels between Frances and a character in the 1848 novel Vanity Fair by William Makepeace Thackeray; both she and Miss Swartz are mixed race women born in the Caribbean and sent to British boarding schools – and who marry into the nobility. In the 21st-century, Daniel Livesay observed similarities between Frances Dalzell and Meghan Markle, another mixed race woman who married into the British upper class.
