= Charles Shaw Lefevre (politician) =

British politician

Charles Shaw Lefevre (20 September 1759 – 27 April 1823), born Charles Shaw, was a British Whig politician.

Shaw Lefevre was the son of Reverend George Shaw, Rector of Womersley, Yorkshire, by his wife Mary, daughter of Edward Green. He was called to the Bar, Lincoln's Inn. He sat as Member of Parliament for Newtown (Isle of Wight) from 1796 to 1802 and for Reading from 1802 to 1820. He was elected a Fellow of the Royal Society in November 1796.

He married Helena, daughter of John Lefevre, in 1789, and in a common practice of the time, merged their surnames, becoming Shaw Lefevre. They lived at Heckfield Place in Hampshire and their children included Charles Shaw Lefevre, 1st Viscount Eversley, Speaker of the House of Commons, and Sir John Shaw Lefevre. Shaw Lefevre died in April 1823, aged 63. His wife survived him by eleven years and died in August 1834.

Parliament of Great Britain
Preceded by Sir John Barrington, Bt; George Canning	Member of Parliament for Newtown (Isle of Wight); 1796–1801; With: Sir Richard Worsley, Bt	Succeeded by Parliament of the United Kingdom
Parliament of the United Kingdom
Preceded by Parliament of Great Britain	Member of Parliament for Newtown (Isle of Wight); 1801–1802; With: Sir Richard Worsley, Bt 1801; Sir Edward Law 1801–1802; Ewan Law 1802	Succeeded by Sir Robert Barclay, Bt; Charles Chapman
Preceded by Francis Annesley; John Simeon	Member of Parliament for Reading; 1802–1820; With: Francis Annesley 1802–1806; John Simeon 1806–1818; Charles Fyshe Palmer 1818–1820	Succeeded by Charles Fyshe Palmer; John Berkeley Monck
