= Daniel Corrie =

English Anglican priest and bishop

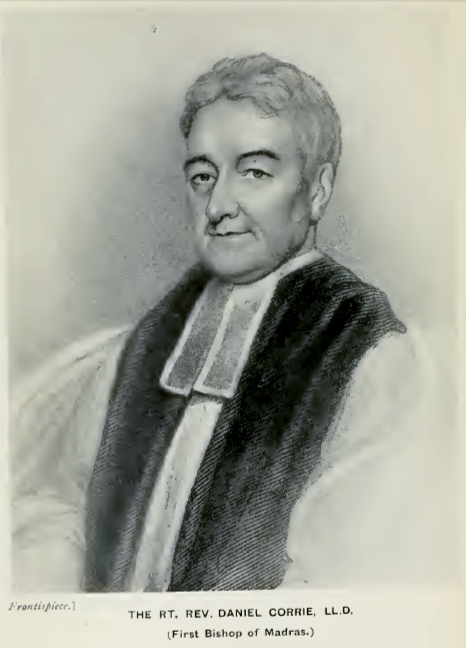
Daniel Corrie from Frank Penny's Book 'The Church in Madras, Volume III' (1922)

Daniel Corrie (10 April 1777 – 5 February 1837) was an English Anglican priest and bishop, the inaugural Bishop of Madras.

== Early Life and Education ==
Corrie was born at Ardchattan, Argyll, Great Britain, the second son of John Corrie, a vicar in Lincolnshire, and Ann McNab. He, like his siblings, was educated by his father. He spent four years in London with a friend of his father's who had also expressed an interest in providing a assistance for Daniel's living. He entered Cambridge in 1799 as a sizar in Clare College but moved to Trinity Hall as an exhibitioner. In 1835, he became affiliated with St Catharine Hall where his brother, George Corrie, was a tutor.

== Ordination and Move to India ==
Corrie was ordained a deacon of the Diocese of Lincoln on 13 June 1802 by the Bishop of Lincoln, Dr. Tomline. Thereafter, he was given the curacy of Buckminster and Stoke Rocheford. He was ordained a priest on 10 June 1804. Corrie joined the East India Company as a chaplain in 1806 and moved to Calcutta. He married Elizabeth Myers (1789-1836) on 16 November 1812 at Barrackpore. They had four children, of whom only two survived infancy. Corrie's health deteriorated in 1815, causing him to move back to England. While away, he gave a sermon the parish church of St. Andrew by the Wardrobe on 30 April, 1816. The sermon was published the same year by the Church Missionary Society in the sixteenth anniversary edition of their annual report.

Corrie returned to India in 1817 where he was promoted to senior chaplain of Calcutta, and was eventually made Archdeacon of Calcutta in 1823. The Calcutta Diocese had a hand in the administration of Anglican institutions across not only South Asia, but as far as Australia. Administration of this diocese devolved to Corrie three times upon the deaths of three Bishops of Calcutta - Bishop Reginald Heber (1826), Bishop Thomas James (1827), and Bishop John Turner (1831).

The Charter Act, 1833, created two new diocese in South Asia within Company lands centred in Presidencies of Madras and Bombay. Corrie was appointed the inaugural Bishop of Madras and consecrated in 1835. He held the post until his death in 1837.

== Death and Legacy ==
Daniel Corrie died on 5 February 1837 after a brief illness. The Times later reported that he had been taken ill at an SPG meeting on 31 January 1837. The Bishop of Calcutta, Daniel Wilson, gave a funeral oration for Corrie where he named the latter, "the parent of the CMS in India, the centre of union and the soul of all its operations." Despite his short tenure, Corrie was

== Gallery ==
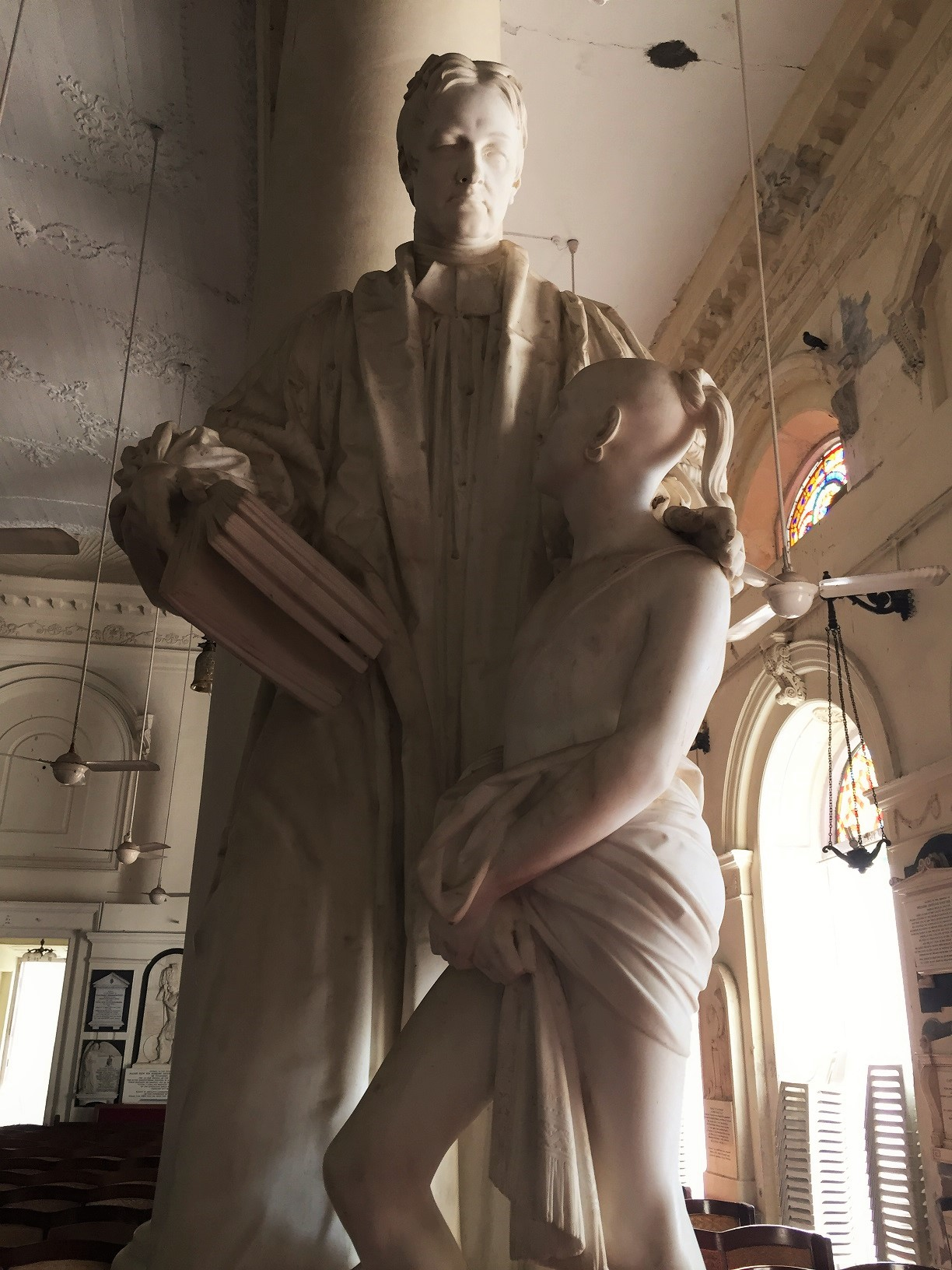
Memorial to Bishop Daniel Corrie, St. George's Cathedral, Madras

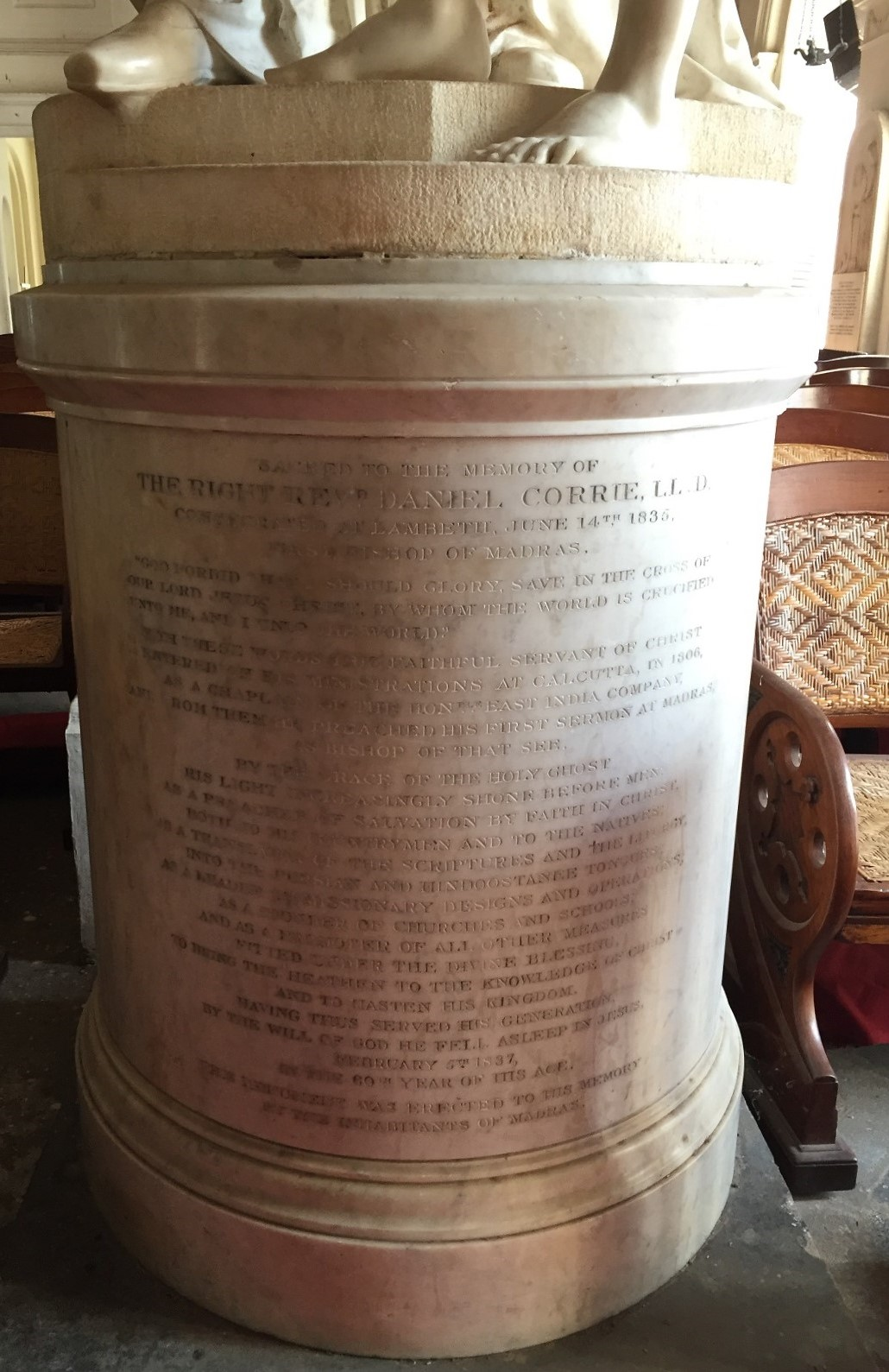
Memorial to Bishop Daniel Corrie, St. George's Cathedral, Madras

Anglican Communion titles
New title	Bishop of Madras; 1835–1837	Succeeded by George Spencer
