= Frank Adams (disambiguation) =

Frank Adams (1930–1989) was a British mathematician.

Frank Adams may also refer to:

- Yank Adams (Frank B. Adams, 1847–1923), finger billiardist
- Frank Reginald Adams (1853–1932), rugby union international
- Frank Dawson Adams (1859–1942), Canadian geologist
- Frank Adams (Florida politician) (1861–1940), state senator
- Frank Adams (illustrator) (1871–1944), British illustrator and landscape artist
- Frank R. Adams (1883–1963), American author, screenwriter, composer, and newspaper reporter
- Frank Adams (artist) (1914–1987), American artist
- Frank Adams (footballer) (1933–2009), goalkeeper
- Bluey Adams (Frank Adams, 1935–2019), Australian rules footballer
- Frank Adams (Canadian football) (born 1970), Canadian football cornerback

== See also ==
- Francis Adams (disambiguation)
- Frank Adam (born 1968), Flemish author
- Frank Forbes Adam (1846–1926), British banker
- Franklin Adams (disambiguation)
- Adams (surname)
