= Choir of Somerville College, Oxford =

College Choir

Choir of Somerville College
- Choir
- Founded: 2001
- Music director: William Dawes (2017-); David Crown (2007-15)
- Chief conductor: William Dawes
- Affiliation: Somerville College
- Website: somervillechoir.com

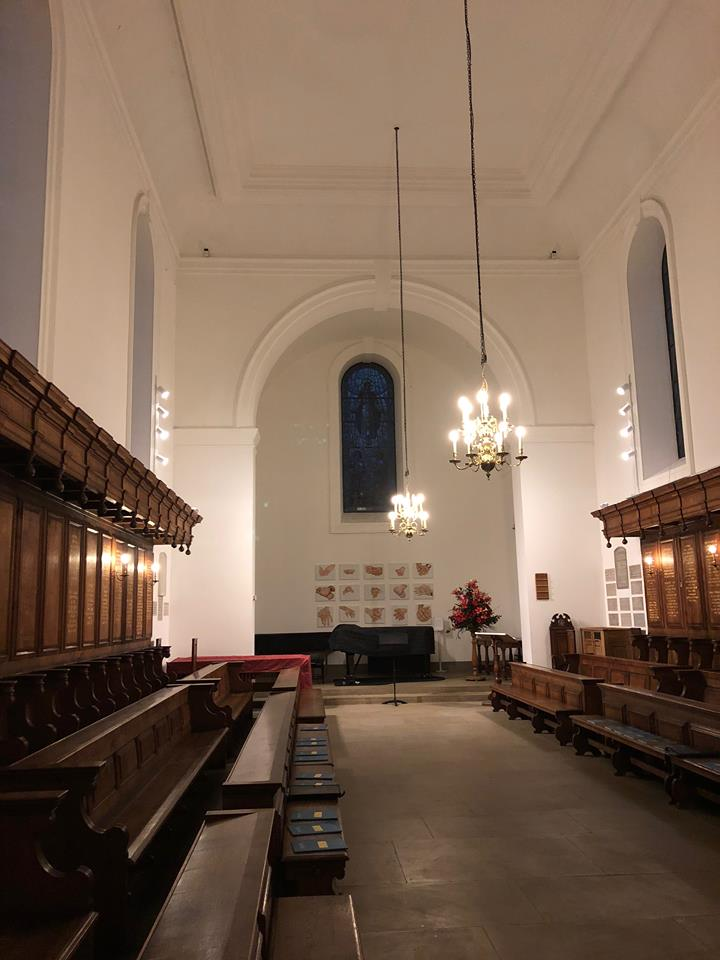
Somerville College Chapel

The Choir of Somerville College, one of the constituent colleges of the University of Oxford, is mixed voice and is led by a Director of Chapel Music, currently William Dawes, incumbent since 2017. In conjunction with the organ scholars, the choir is central to the musical life of the college and, in its present form, was founded by Francis Knights and Sam Bayliss in 2001. Previous Directors of Chapel Music include David Crown, who directed the choir between 2007 and 2015. The choir sings in Somerville College Chapel every Sunday during term and performs regularly in concerts organised by Somerville Music Society. The organ of the college chapel is a traditionally voiced instrument by Harrison & Harrison. Somerville offers up to five Choral Exhibitions each year to applicants reading any subject.

== Performances ==
The choir has sung services and concerts at Blackburn, Coventry, Southwark, St Paul's, Wells, Worcester and Winchester cathedrals, as well as in places such as Brighton, Oxford, Swindon and Upton. The choir has been involved in two opera productions: Gluck's Orfeo ed Euridice and Purcell’s Dido and Aeneas.

In 2009/2010 the choir appeared in a memorial concert for Somerville alumna Iris Murdoch, performed Handel's Messiah and gave a performance of John Tavener's Song for Athene in the presence of Tavener himself and his wife, a Somerville alumna.

In 2010/2011 the choir performed Bach's St John Passion and recorded its first commercial CD, under David Crown's directorship: 'Requiem æternam' (Maurice Duruflé's Requiem and Robin Milford's Mass for Five Voices), which was released by Stone Records in 2012. The album features Guy Johnston (cello), Christine Rice (mezzo-soprano) and Mark Stone (baritone).

In 2011/2012 the choir performed Bach's Easter cantata Christ lag in Todesbanden and Schubert's Mass No. 2 with an orchestra and sang evensong at St Paul's Cathedral to mark the Diamond Jubilee of Elizabeth II. The choir also toured Lancashire, singing concerts at Blackburn Cathedral and Lancaster Priory.

Engagements in 2012/2013 included further performances at St Paul's Cathedral, a concert at the Liberal Jewish Synagogue in London as well as the release of a second CD, 'Advent Calendar', in Autumn 2013 which was featured in the in-flight programming of selected British Airways flights. The choir also made an appearance on BBC Radio 3.

In 2014 the choir sang evensong at Coventry Cathedral and gave two performances of Bach's St John Passion featuring an orchestra and soloists from the Royal College of Music.

On 14 June 2015 the choir hosted a special evensong, attended by many choir alumni, to bid farewell Director of Chapel Music, David Crown, who had been in post for eight years. In January 2017, William Dawes was appointed Director of Chapel Music.

In November 2022, the choir released its next album, 'The Dawn of Grace: Music for Christmas'. The album features the music of female composers Judith Weir, Cecilia McDowall, Errollyn Wallen, Cheryl Frances-Hoad, Joanna Marsh, Shruthi Rajasekar, Abbie Betinis, Kerensa Briggs, Sarah Quartel, Anna Semple, and more.

On 22 August 2025, the choir released 'Divine Light: The Living Indian Choral Tradition', including works by Indian and Indian-heritage composers Reena Esmail, Nirmala Rajasekar, Vanraj Bhatia, Victor Paranjoti, and Shruthi Rajasekar along with choral compositions setting Indian texts by Gabriel Jackson and Craig Hella Johnson.

On 8 May 2026, the choir released its latest disc, 'Moonrise: Choral Works by Christopher Churcher'. The album features sacred and secular compositions by Churcher, a member of the choir. It includes the Pride Motets, commissioned for Somerville College’s LGBTQ Pride services, and Wintersongs which set the text of three carols.

== Tours ==
In 2005 and 2009 the choir toured Germany under the patronage of the ambassador Sir Peter Torry and sang services and concerts in Berlin, Brandenburg and Potsdam.

Another foreign tour in 2010 took the choir to Italy where the group performed in Crema, Lodi and Milan.

In 2014 the choir undertook a tour of the United States, singing services and concerts at Washington National Cathedral and the National City Christian Church in Washington, D.C. as well as several venues in Massachusetts, Delaware.

In 2016 the choir toured the US again and sang services and concerts in Virginia, New York City (such as Trinity Church and Grace Church) and Connecticut.

In December 2018, the choir enjoyed a successful tour to India, becoming the first Oxford college choir to perform in the country. The tour involved a mixture of performances at prestigious venues including the NCPA and Mehboob Studio in Mumbai and the Church of St. Francis of Assisi in Old Goa, as well as outreach work with charities including Songbound and the Karta Initiative. The choir returned to India for a second, similar tour in December 2023.
