= Francis Adams =

Francis Adams may refer to:

- Francis Adams (translator) (1796–1861), Scottish medical doctor and translator of Greek medical works
- Francis Adams (writer) (1862–1893), English essayist, poet, dramatist, novelist and journalist
- Francis Adams (athlete) (1953–1987), sprinter from Trinidad and Tobago
- Francis Colburn Adams (1850–1891), American miscellaneous writer
- Francis Ottiwell Adams (1825–1889), British diplomat
- Francis W. H. Adams (1904–1990), New York City Police Commissioner, 1954–1955
- Francis Adams (cricketer) (1835–1911), Australian cricketer

== See also ==
- Frank Adams (disambiguation)
- Adams (surname)
