= Hôpital Temporaire d'Arc-en-Barrois =

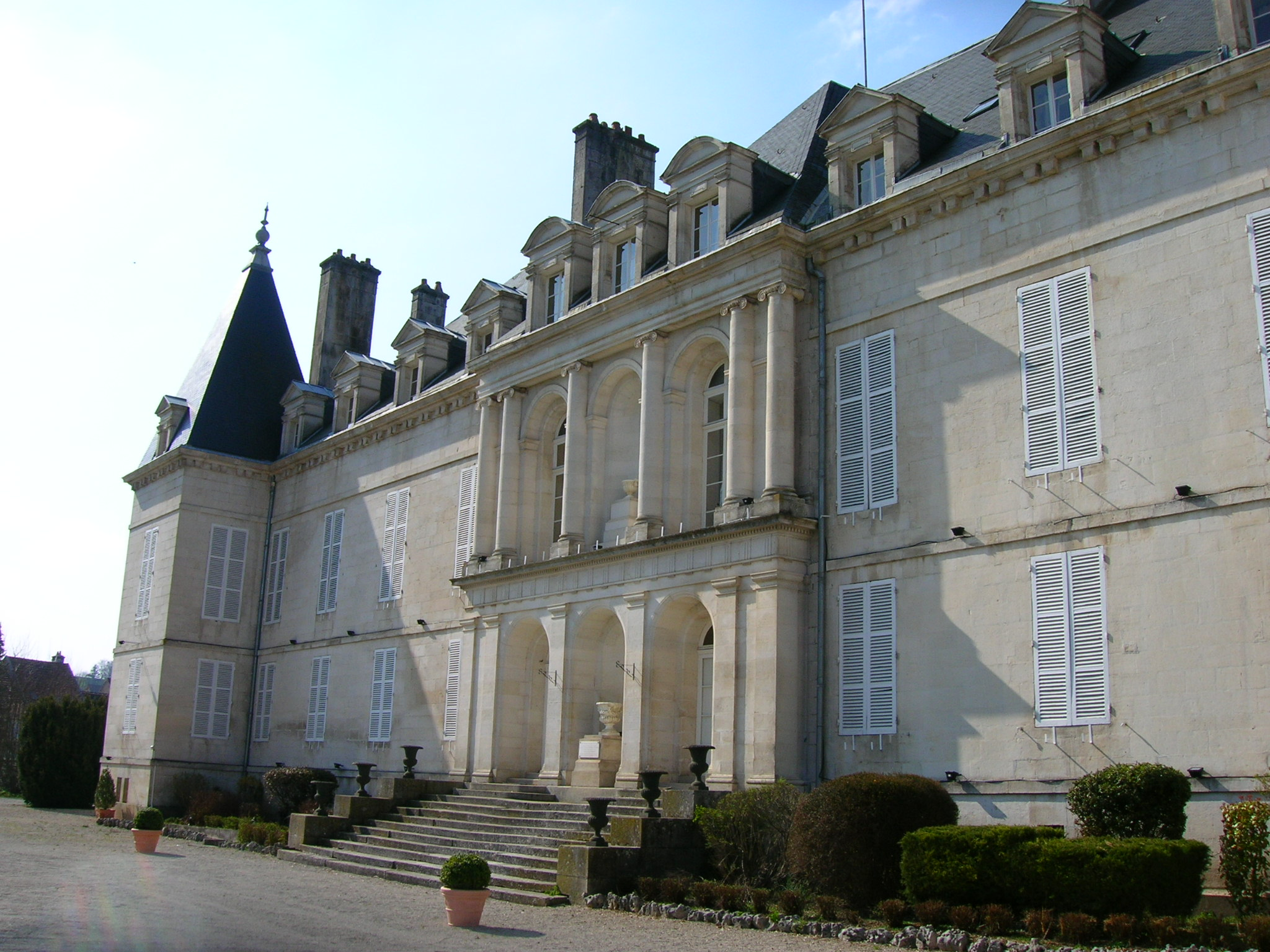
- Château d'Arc-en-Barrois

Geography
- Location: Château d'Arc-en-Barrois, Haute-Marne, France
- Coordinates: 47°56′51″N 5°00′25″E

Organisation
- Type: Military hospital

Services
- Beds: 180

History
- Opened: January 1915
- Closed: February 1919

Links
- Lists: Hospitals in France

Hôpital Temporaire d'Arc-en-Barrois was an emergency evacuation hospital serving the French 3rd Army Corps during World War I. It was organised and staffed by British volunteers and served French soldiers.

== History ==
Hôpital Temporaire d'Arc-en-Barrois was a voluntary civilian British hospital unit established in the Château d'Arc-en-Barrois, Haute-Marne, France, for the aid of wounded French soldiers in the Great War. Founded in January 1915 under approval of the Anglo-French Hospital Committee of the British Red Cross Society, London, the hospital of 110 beds was conducted under military command of the French army's Service de Santé. The hospital's first military casualties arrived on 27 January 1915 from the Argonne Forest battlefront. In February 1915 the regional Service de Santé requested an expansion of hospital services and a convalescent hospital was established in the vacant village hospice building, bringing the total number of beds to 180.

Located sixty miles or more to the rear of the war's entrenched front lines, Hôpital Temporaire received casualties from battles in the Argonne Forest and Champagne Offensive (1915), Verdun (1916) and the Meuse-Argonne Campaign (1918). Throughout the war wounded soldiers arrived in Haute-Marne via hospital train through Latrecey-Ormoy-sur-Aube, a remote station located 11 miles from Arc-en-Barrois, and were transported to the château aboard Hôpital Temporaire's small motor ambulance fleet. Wounded and sick soldiers were attended in hospital by a staff of female trained nurses, a small contingent of surgeons and medical students and female auxiliary hospital staff provided by the British Red Cross Voluntary Aid Detachment (V.A.D.). Male volunteers authorized by the British Red Cross typically served as hospital orderlies and ambulance drivers. The hospital maintained numerous essential services—operating theatre, anesthesia, radiography, dentistry, apothecary and clinical laboratory--was financially supported by a large international donor base and supplied regularly by voluntary British war supply depots.

In continuous service until its official demobilization in February 1919, the hospital received a total of 3071 patients; 76 deaths were recorded. More than 400 voluntary and contracted staff served at Hôpital Temporaire, representing the United Kingdom, Canada and Newfoundland, Australia, USA and Denmark.

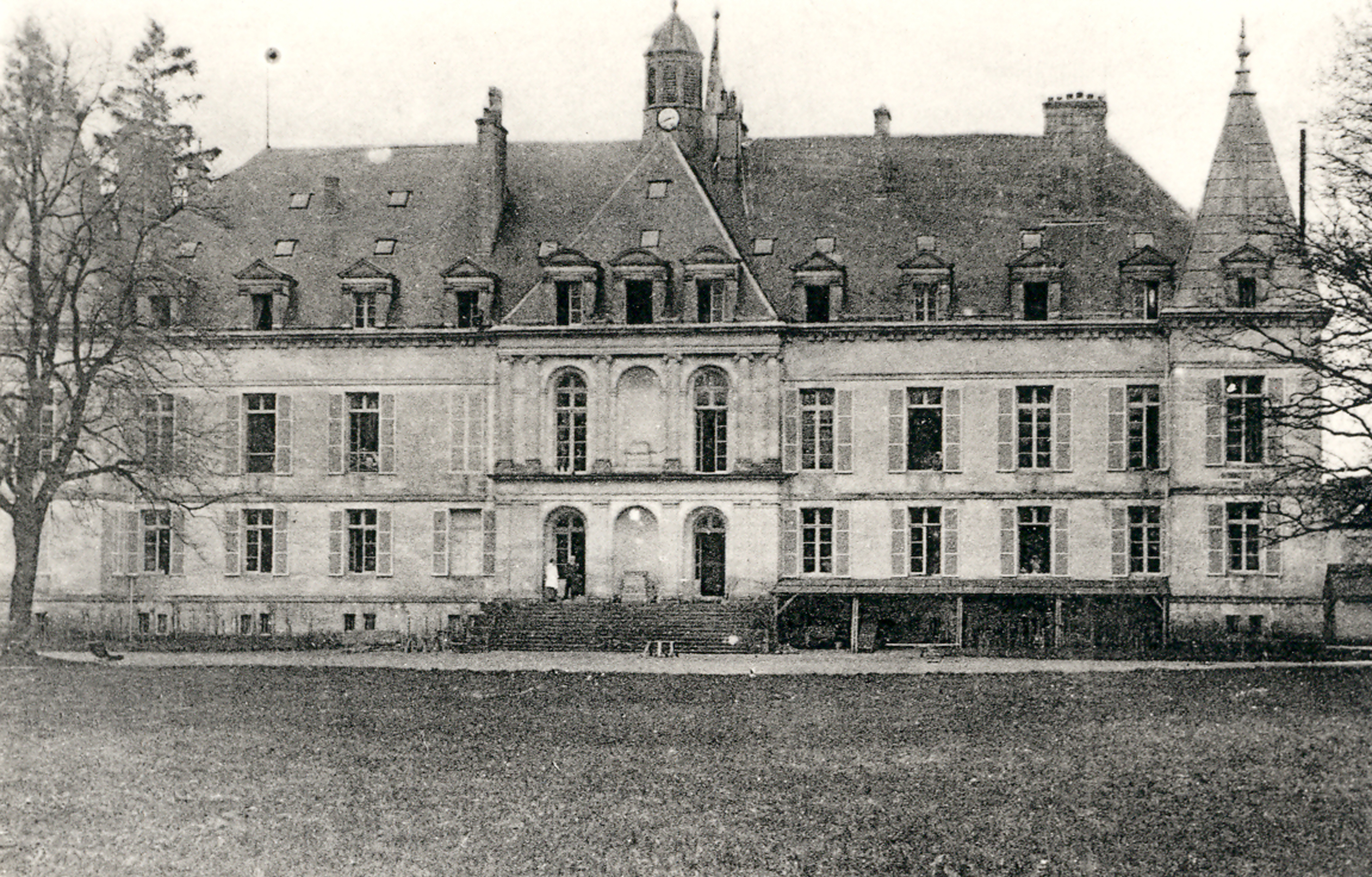
Hôpital Temporaire d'Arc-en-Barrois, 1915

=== The Hospital's founding: 1914 ===
In the autumn of 1914 four English sisters, Madeline and Susan Bromley-Martin, Eleanor Martin-Holland and Anora Russell, natives of Worcestershire, learned of the French military's catastrophic shortage of military hospital beds and trained nurses. Among British civilians eager to supply their French ally with medical supplies and hospital staff, the Bromley-Martin sisters gathered financial donors and hospital volunteers to offer humanitarian aid to the French military. A family friend, Lady Kathleen Scott, the Rodin-trained sculptor and widow of the Antarctic explorer Robert Falcon Scott, helped organize a hospital plan and recruited volunteers from her circle of London artist friends. Funds were raised by donation or monthly subscription.

The British Red Cross and War Office officials did not want civilian interference in international military medical affairs and deterred amateur organizers from sending unauthorized voluntary hospitals to France. In 1914 the British Red Cross and Order of St. John Ambulance Association officially combined forces to both authorize and restrict ad hoc philanthropy with tough committee oversight. Social connections helped the Bromley-Martins obtain the personal support of the joint committee's chairmen, Sir Claude Maxwell MacDonald and the Hon. Arthur Stanley, M.P. The hospital project gained approval in November 1914 after Emily Georgiana Kemp, a British artist, writer and international explorer, offered salary support for an 11-member corps of experienced trained nurses.

Two additional challenges remained: obtaining French military authorization to permit the installation of a civilian-run British hospital, and the acquisition of a temporary hospital building to house it. By December 1914 there were no sites available in proximity to the French coastline. The project appeared headed for failure. Lady Scott and E.G. Kemp made an emergency trip to France to search for a location and work to get the French military approval. The two women grasped at the French Red Cross offer of an empty château in the rural eastern France village of Arc-en-Barrois, Haute-Marne. In December the building, the hospital proposal and the installation of British hospital workers were approved by French Minister of War Alexandre Millerand and Service de Santé chief, Dr Ange François Troussaint.

== Personnel ==
Hôpital Temporaire's voluntary hospital personnel included a significant number of writers, poets, artists and illustrators. Lady Kathleen Scott organized the hospital's small auto ambulance service and led a contingent of volunteer drivers and orderlies to Arc-en-Barrois in January 1915. Henry Tonks, retired doctor, painter and Slade Art School Professor was among Lady Scott's recruits, a founding member of the hospital serving from January to April 1915 as anaesthetist and ward physician. John Masefield, Britain's future Poet Laureate, served a six-week term as a volunteer orderly during the spring of 1915. The English poet Laurence Binyon, volunteered as a hospital orderly during 1915 and 1916. His ward experiences among wounded French soldiers inspired his poems, "Fetching the Wounded", "The Distant Guns", "Men of Verdun", and "La Patrie". The English Impressionist painter, Wilfrid de Glehn and his American-born wife, artist Jane Emmet de Glehn, were among Hôpital Temporaire's first volunteers; Wilfrid served as hospital orderly, military interpreter and ambulance driver; Jane supervised laundry and tea service and sketched soldiers' portraits for the benefit of a limb prosthetics fund. British architect Edmund Fisher, son of historian Herbert William Fisher worked as an orderly in 1915, helping with carpentry and X-ray work. Other notable artists were children's book illustrator Frank Adams (illustrator); painter William Radford Dakin, a former obstetrician and physician; and lithographer Arthur Cadogan Blunt.

Hôpital Temporaire's noteworthy voluntary orderlies and auxiliary hospital workers: 1915–1918
Susan Strong, mezzo-soprano of the New York Metropolitan Opera and London Opera
Robert Charles Phillimore, son of Lord Justice, Sir Walter Phillimore
Wilson Crewdson, author and curator of Japanese Art, British Museum
Emily Georgiana Kemp, author, painter, Asia explorer
John Ronald Moreton Macdonald of Largie, historian and Scottish laird
The Honorable Dorothy Emmott, daughter of Lord and Lady Alfred Emmott
The Honorable Gertrude Forbes-Sempill, daughter of William Forbes-Sempill, 17th Lord Sempill
Lady Lillian (née FitzRoy) Robertson, daughter of Alfred FitzRoy, 8th Duke of Grafton
Lady Elizabeth Keppel, daughter of Arnold Keppel, 8th Earl of Albemarle
Oliver Wallop, 8th Earl of Portsmouth
Gerard Vernon Wallop, son of Oliver Wallop
Dr.Basilio Valdes, American Red Cross surgeon, later Chief of Staff and Secretary of National Defense of the Commonwealth of the Philippines.
Henry Michael Gordon Clark, son of H. H. Gordon Clark of Mickleham Hall, Surrey, and Matthew Clark & Sons, wine and spirit importers (later chairman of the firm)
