= Emily Georgiana Kemp =

British adventurer, artist and writer

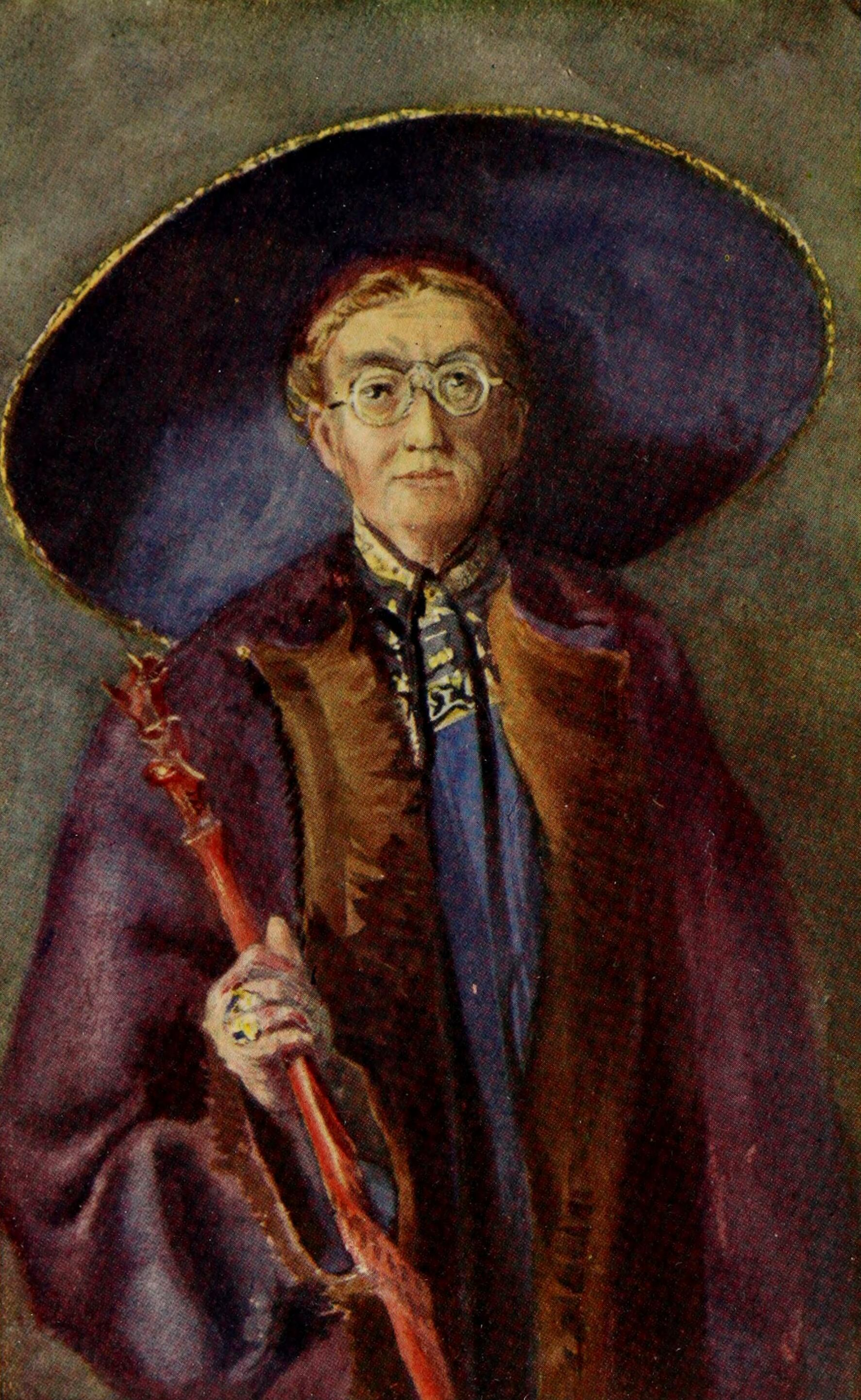
- Emily Georgiana Kemp self portrait as Chinese "Female Travel-Scholar" from her 1909 book
- Born: 1860; Rochdale
- Died: 1939 (aged 78–79)
- Occupations: Writer, artist
- Family: George Kemp, 1st Baron Rochdale (brother)

Emily Georgiana Kemp (1860–1939) was a British adventurer, artist and writer. She was awarded the Grande Médaille de Vermeil by the French Geographical Society for her 1921 work Chinese Mettle.

== Biography ==
Kemp was born in Rochdale to parents George Tawke Kemp and Emily Kelsall. She had four older sisters and a younger brother, George. The family were devout Baptists and wealthy middle class industrialists; her father and maternal grandfather Henry Kelsall ran a textile manufacturing firm. Kemp was of the first students at Somerville College, Oxford. She continued her studies at the Slade School of Fine Art, University College London.

She travelled in China, Korea, India, Central Asia and the Amazon, sketching, painting and writing, sometimes travelling with May Meiklejon MacDougall. The focus of her works was the education and welfare of women and their role in religion.

In 1914, Kemp organised and supported trained nurses who travelled to France in January 1915 to work at the Hopital Temporaire d'Arc-en-Barrois, which became well known for its volunteer corps of artists and writers, including Kathleen Scott, John Masefield, Henry Tonks and Laurence Binyon.

Kemp was friendly with the theologian Marcus Dods, the explorer Francis Younghusband and Albert Schweitzer. She donated the Somerville College Chapel in the University of Oxford as a "house of prayer for all people" (that is, of all religions). During her travels, Kemp developed a strong interest in non-Christian religions. She wished for Somerville College Chapel to be a place where students of all religions could pray. For this reason she encouraged delegates of the 1937 World Congress of Faiths staying in Oxford to use the chapel for their devotions.

Kemp also donated a 19th-century Italian terracotta derived from the 'Annunciation lunette' in the Ospedale degli Innocenti in Florence, by Andrea della Robbia, the subject of which was symbolic to her of the special importance of women in serving God.

Kemp bequeathed her collection to the Indian Institute, Oxford, and it subsequently became a formative part of the Eastern Art Dept, Ashmolean Museum.

== Bibliography ==
- The Face of China (1909)
- The Face of Manchuria, Korea and Russian Turkestan (1910)
- Wanderings in Chinese Turkestan (1914)
- Reminiscences of a Sister, S. Florence Edwards, of Taiyüanfu (1920)
- Chinese Mettle (1921)
- There Followed Him, Women (1927)
