= Somerville College Chapel =

Somerville College Chapel, Oxford
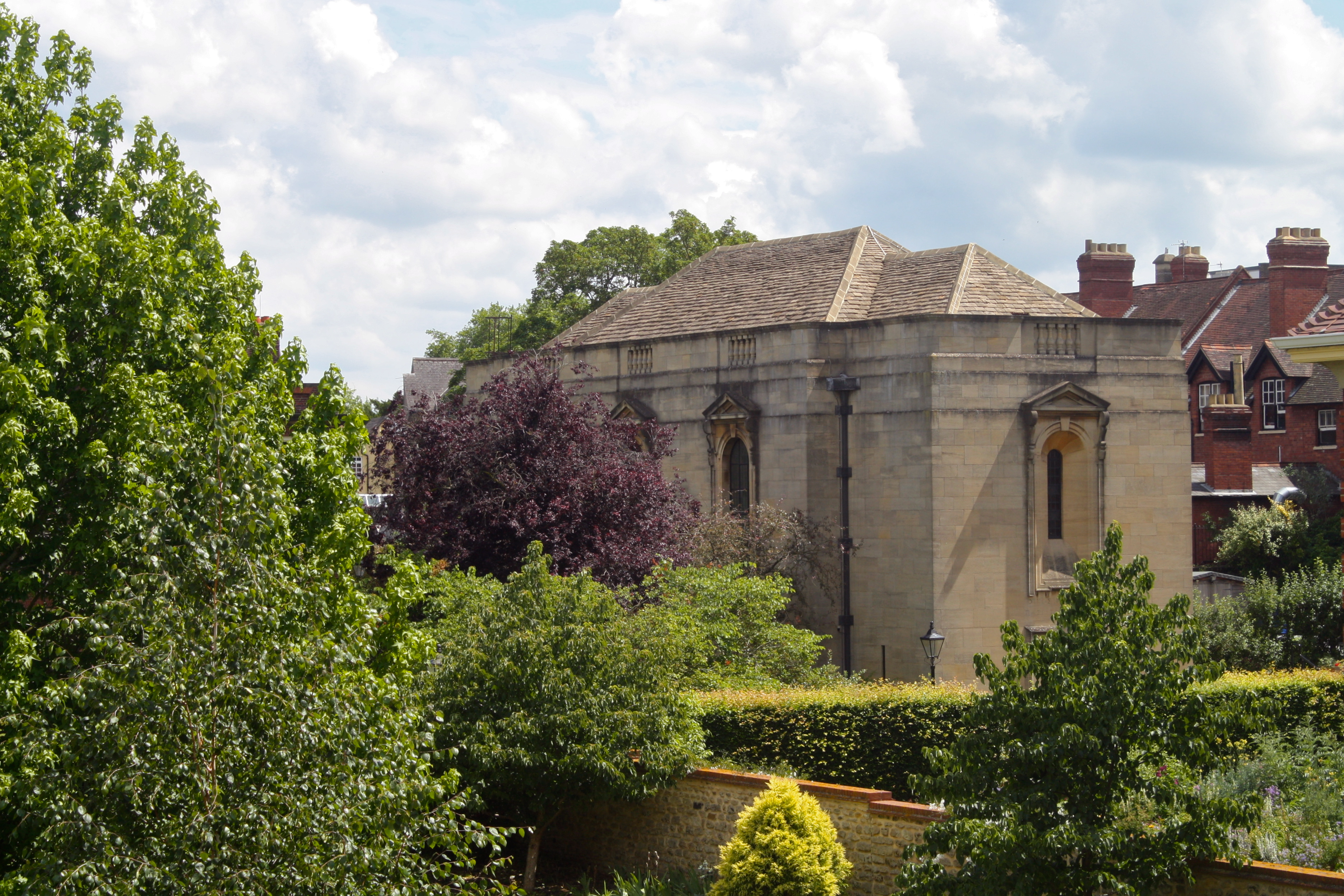
- Somerville College Chapel, Oxford
- 51°45′33.8″N 1°15′47.1″W
- OS grid reference: SP 50957 07000
- Location: Somerville College, Oxford
- Country: England
- Denomination: none
- Website: Official website

History
- Founder: Emily Georgiana Kemp

Architecture
- Architect: Courtenay Theobald
- Completed: 1935

Somerville College Chapel is the chapel of Somerville College, Oxford. The chapel is unique among Oxford colleges because it has no religious affiliation - reflecting the non-sectarian foundation of the college as place for the higher education of women. It can be seen as both a manifestation of the aspirations of liberal Christianity in the interwar years, including the advancement of women and ecumenism, and of the contestation of the role of religion in higher education among elites in the same period.

The chapel is made of dimension stone ashlar masonry and is located opposite Somerville College Library, on the southern side of the main quad. When he visited the chapel in the early 1970s, Sir Nikolaus Pevsner described it as bleakly classical, ashlar, of three windows with narrower altar and lobby protections, bleak also inside - unloved-looking somehow.

== History ==
The chapel was built with a donation from Somerville alumna Emily Georgiana Kemp in 1932; Kemp had developed an interest in the world's religions and a wide, inclusive vision of Christianity through her extensive travels around the world. It was Kemp's desire that the chapel would be a place where members of all nationalities and religions could pray. Like the college, the chapel would be nondenominational, which is unique within the University of Oxford.

The chapel was designed by Courtenay Theobald and opened in 1935. It was dedicated to God, with only the stained glass window (designed by George Bell) being dedicated to Christ explicitly. On the outside of the chapel, the Greek inscription ΟΙΚΟΣ ΠΡΟΣΕΥΧΗΣ ΠΑΣΙ ΤΟΙΣ ΕΘΝΕΣΙΝ translates as A House of Prayer for all People. This is a verse from Isaiah 56, which is referred to by Jesus in the Gospel of Matthew.

Kemp also donated a 19th-century Italian terracotta derived from the 'Annunciation lunette' in the Ospedale degli Innocenti in Florence, by Andrea della Robbia, the subject of which was symbolic to her of the special importance of women in serving God.

Notable Somervillians commemorated on the chapel's wall are Constance Coltman, Britain's first ordained female minister in a mainstream church and Dorothy L. Sayers, the novelist and Christian apologist, as well as Margaret Thatcher, the first female Prime Minister of the United Kingdom. There is also a commemoration of Emily Penrose, the third principal.

== Use ==
The chapel does not have a chaplain but a Chapel Director due to the nondenominational tradition of the college. The current Chapel Director is Monty Sharma. In addition to providing opportunities for traditional Christian worship and in keeping with the college's liberal and inclusive tradition, the chapel hosts speakers with a range of religious perspectives. Past invited speakers include Alister McGrath, Shirley Williams, Kallistos Ware, Andrew Copson and Rosamund Bartlett.

There is an annual commemoration service for Somervillians who have died during the year.

The Choir of Somerville College sings in the chapel.

== Organ ==
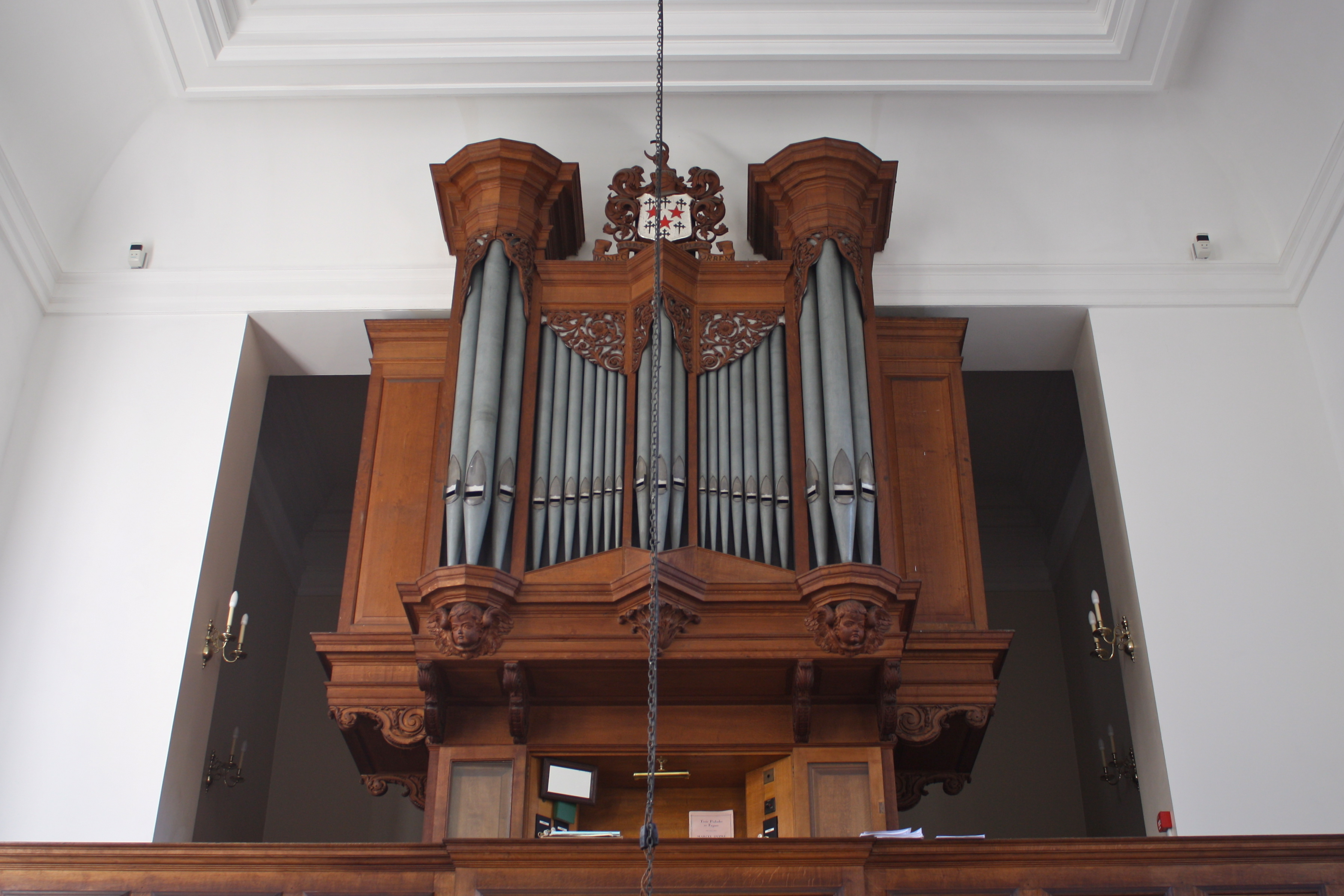
Organ

The organ of the chapel was made in 1937 by Harrison & Harrison in Durham. Nobel Prize winner and Kemp's friend Albert Schweitzer was the chapel's organ advisor and recommended a Neo-Baroque organ, as this style was popular in the Organ reform movement. However, the college voted for an organ voiced in the style of the Romantic era. The organ case is made of oak, designed by Theobald, and was renovated in 2012. The instrument is regularly used for solo recitals, concerts and recordings.

The chapel also houses a Steinway & Sons grand piano, a two-manual harpsichord by Robert Goble and a portable digital piano.

== Gallery ==
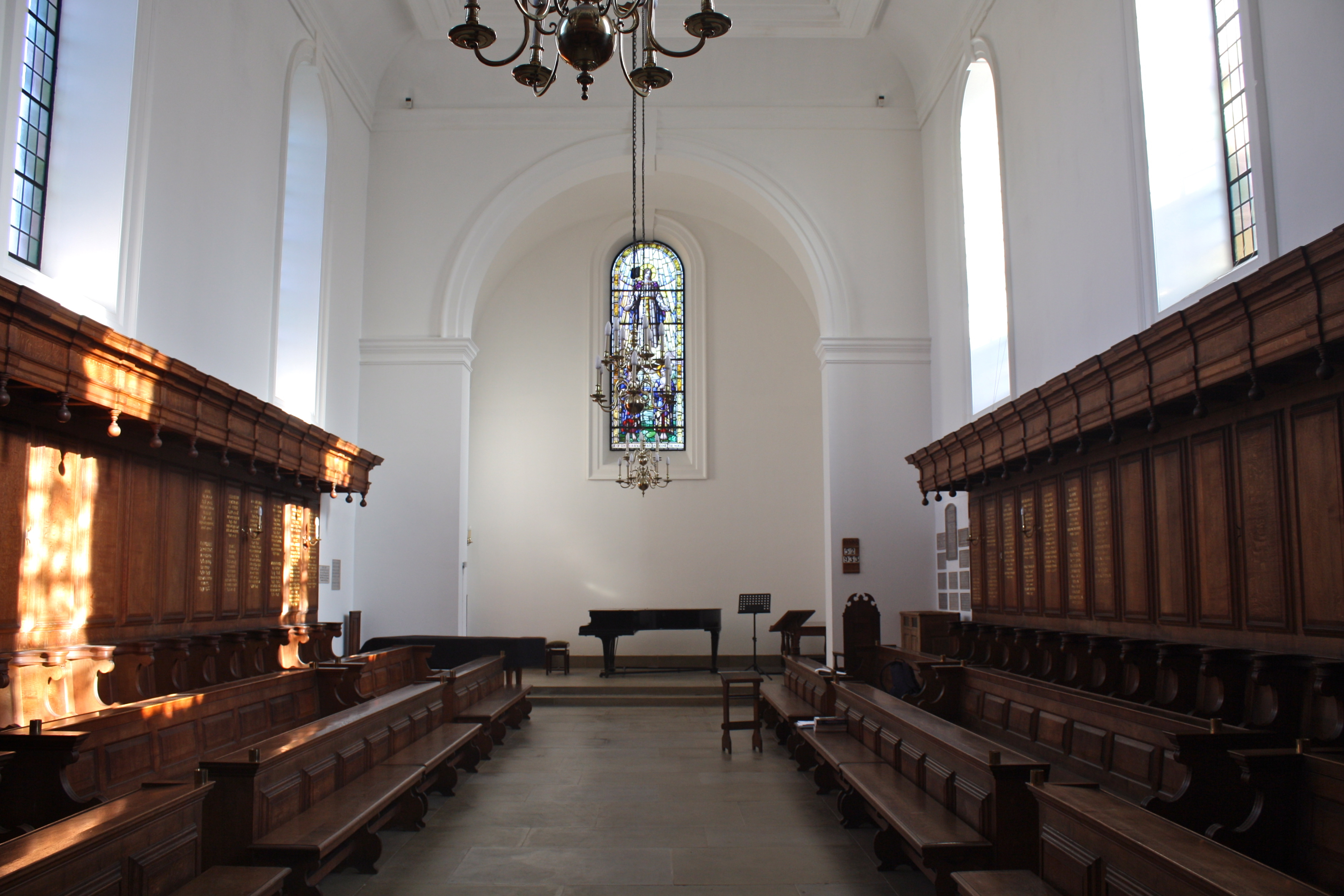
Interior (East)

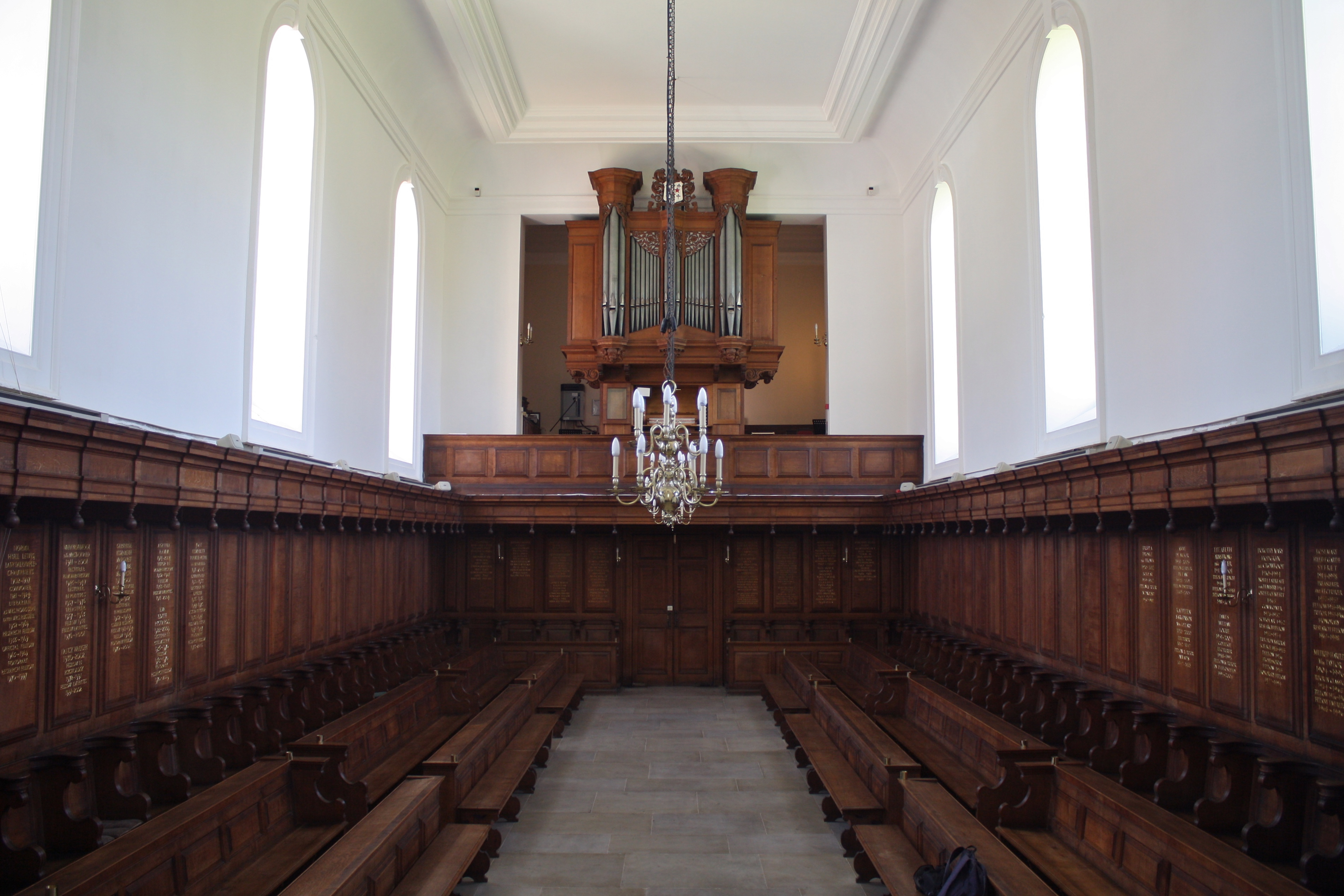
Interior (West)

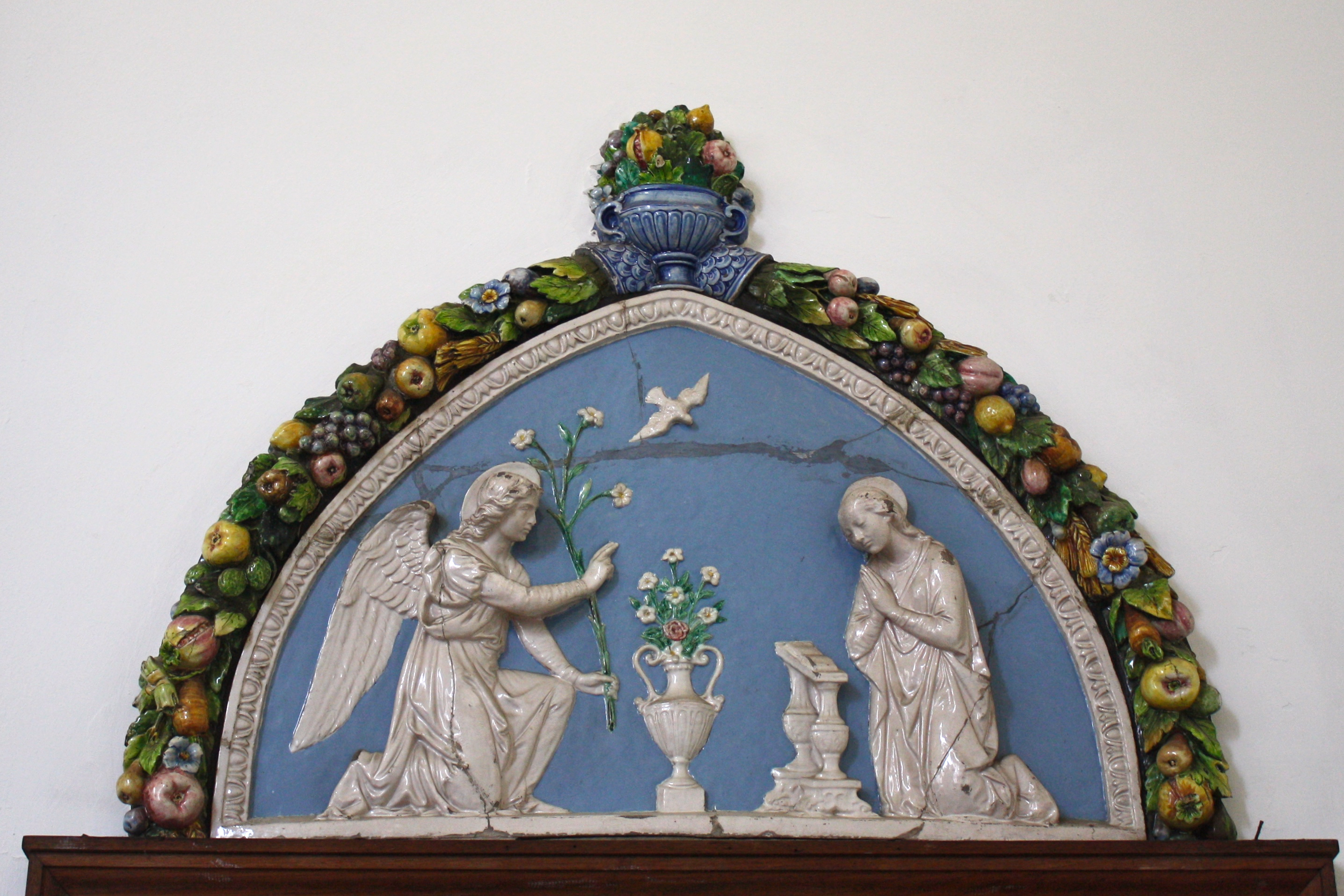
Annunciation lunette

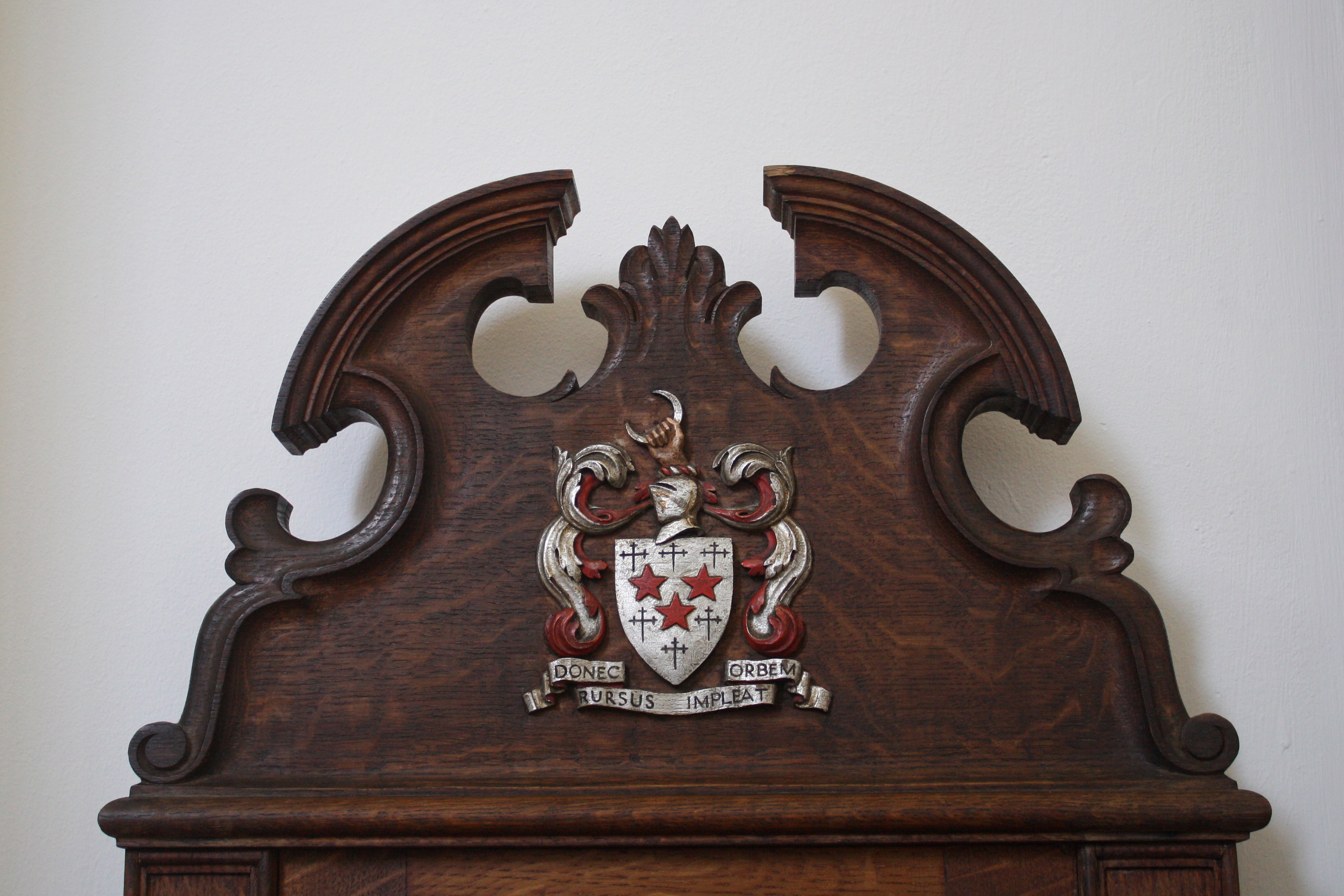
Ceremonial chair with college arms

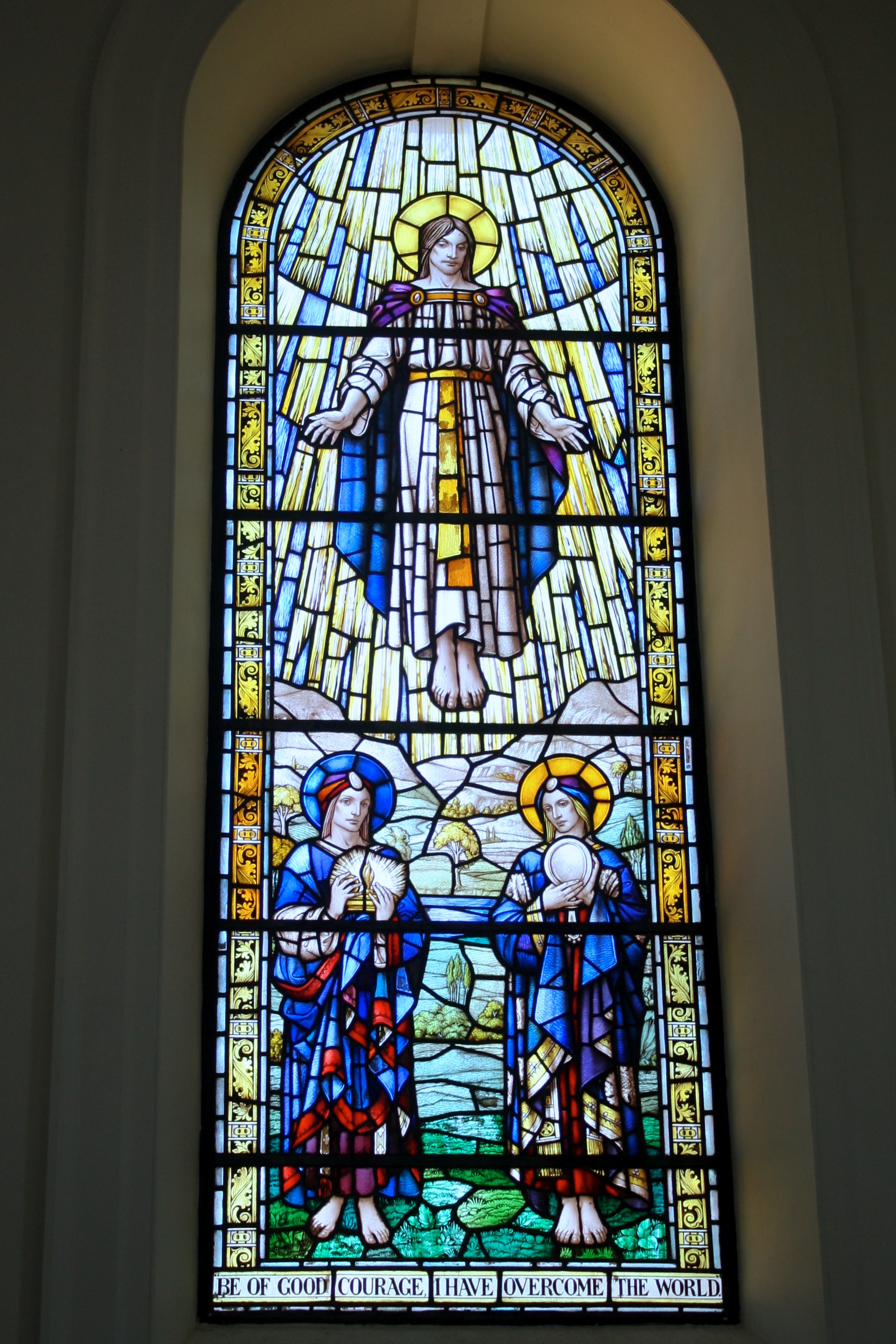
Stained glass window

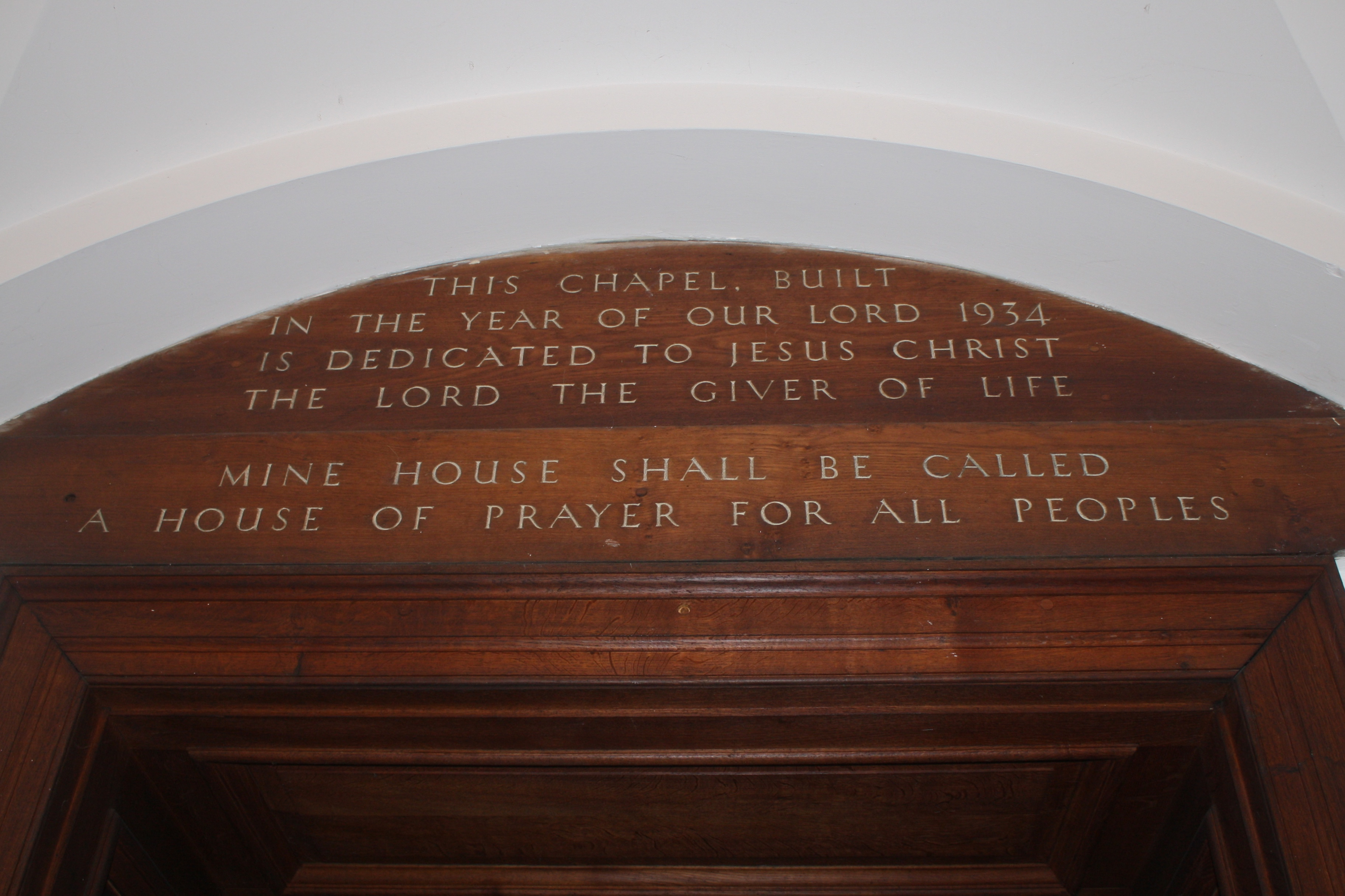
Inscription above the chapel door

== Literature ==
- Architect and Building News. 1935. "The Chapel, Somerville College, Oxford." The Architect and Building News, 22 February, London: Building and Contract Journals Ltd.
- Arweck, Elisabeth; Bullivant, Stephen & Lee, Louis, eds. 2014. Secularity and Non-Religion. London: Routledge.
- Braybrooke, Marcus. 2013. Widening Vision: The World Congress of Faith and the Growing Interfaith Movement. Oxfordshire: Braybrooke Press.
- Crompton, Andrew. 2013. "The Architecture of Multifaith Spaces—God Leaves the Building." The Journal of Architecture 18 (4)
- Darbishire, Helen. 1962. Somerville Chapel Addresses and Other Papers. London: Headly.
- Harvey, Barbara. 1984. Address given at the Service of Thanksgiving for Somerville Chapel on Sunday 28th October by Barbara Harvey. Somerville College Archive.
- Harvey, Barbara. 2008. Somerville Chapel: A Short History. Address by Barbara Harvey in Somerville Chapel. Somerville College Archive.
- Harvey, Barbara. 2013. Address given by Barbara Harvey in Somerville Chapel on Sunday 21st May. Somerville College Archive.
- Johnson, Karla & Laurence, Peter. 2012. "Multi-Faith Religious Spaces on College and University Campuses." Religion and Education 39 (1)
- Kemp, Emily G. 1937. Chapel Leaflet, Somerville College Archive.
- Moulin-Stożek, D., & Gatty, F. K. (2018). A House of Prayer for all Peoples? The Unique Case of Somerville College Chapel, Oxford. Material Religion, 14(1), 83-114.
- Somerville College. 1935. Order of the Service at the Dedication of the Chapel. Oxford: Somerville College.
- Taylor, Charles. 2007. A Secular Age. Cambridge, MA: Harvard University Press.
