= Château d'Arc-en-Barrois =

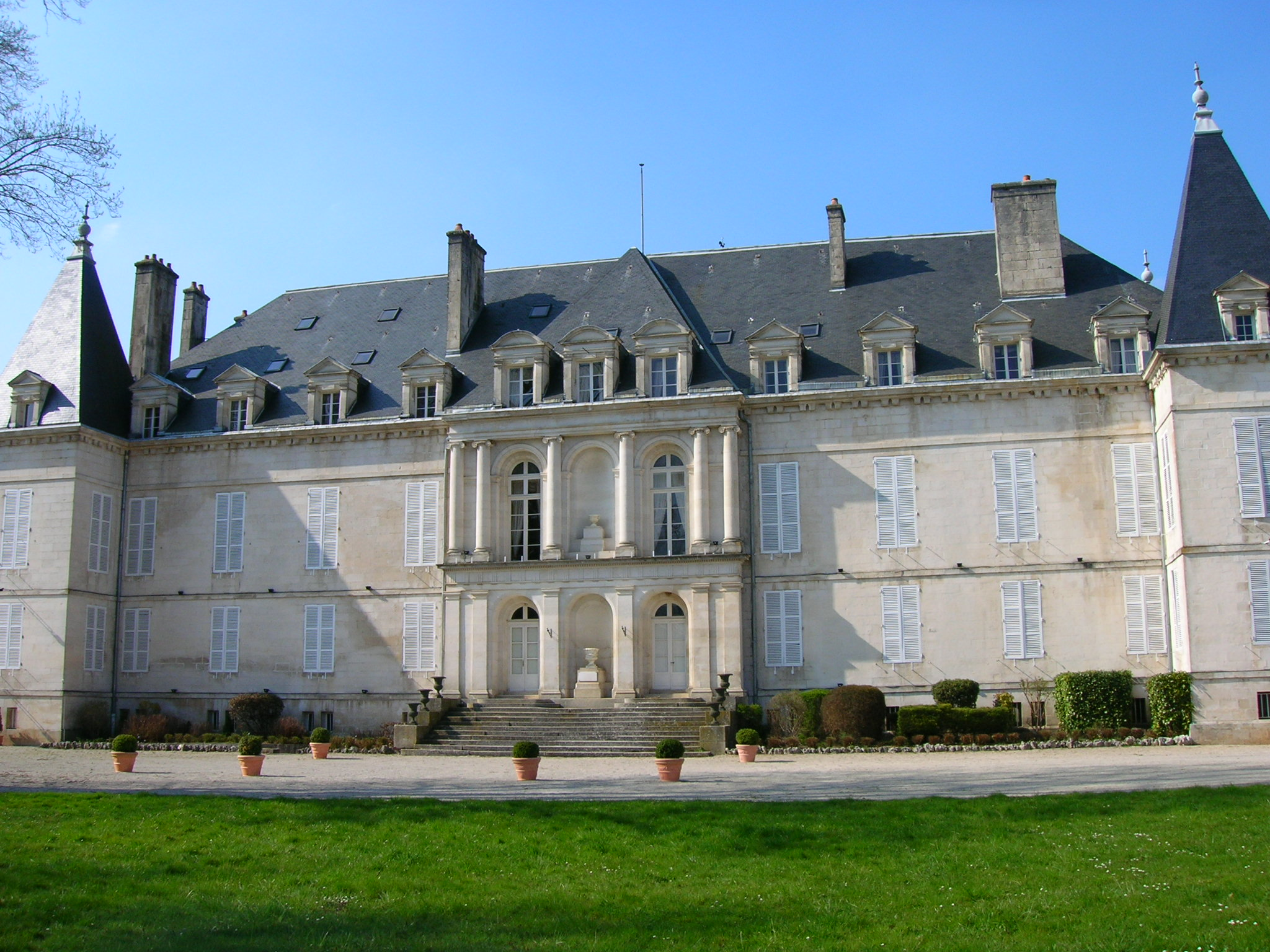
- Façade of the château

- Location within France

General information
- Location: France
- Coordinates: 47°56′51″N 5°00′25″E
- Construction started: 1845
- Owner: Government of France

Château d'Arc-en-Barrois is a château in Haute-Marne, France.

== History ==
The present château was built on the site of a castle that was destroyed in 1793 during the French Revolution. The Arc-en-Barrois area belonged in 1622 to Nicolas de L'Hospital, Duke of Vitry; it was bought in 1679 from his son by Count Morstein who ceded it in 1693 to Louis Alexandre, Count of Toulouse, whose son Louis Jean Marie de Bourbon, Duke of Penthièvre, inherited the estate.

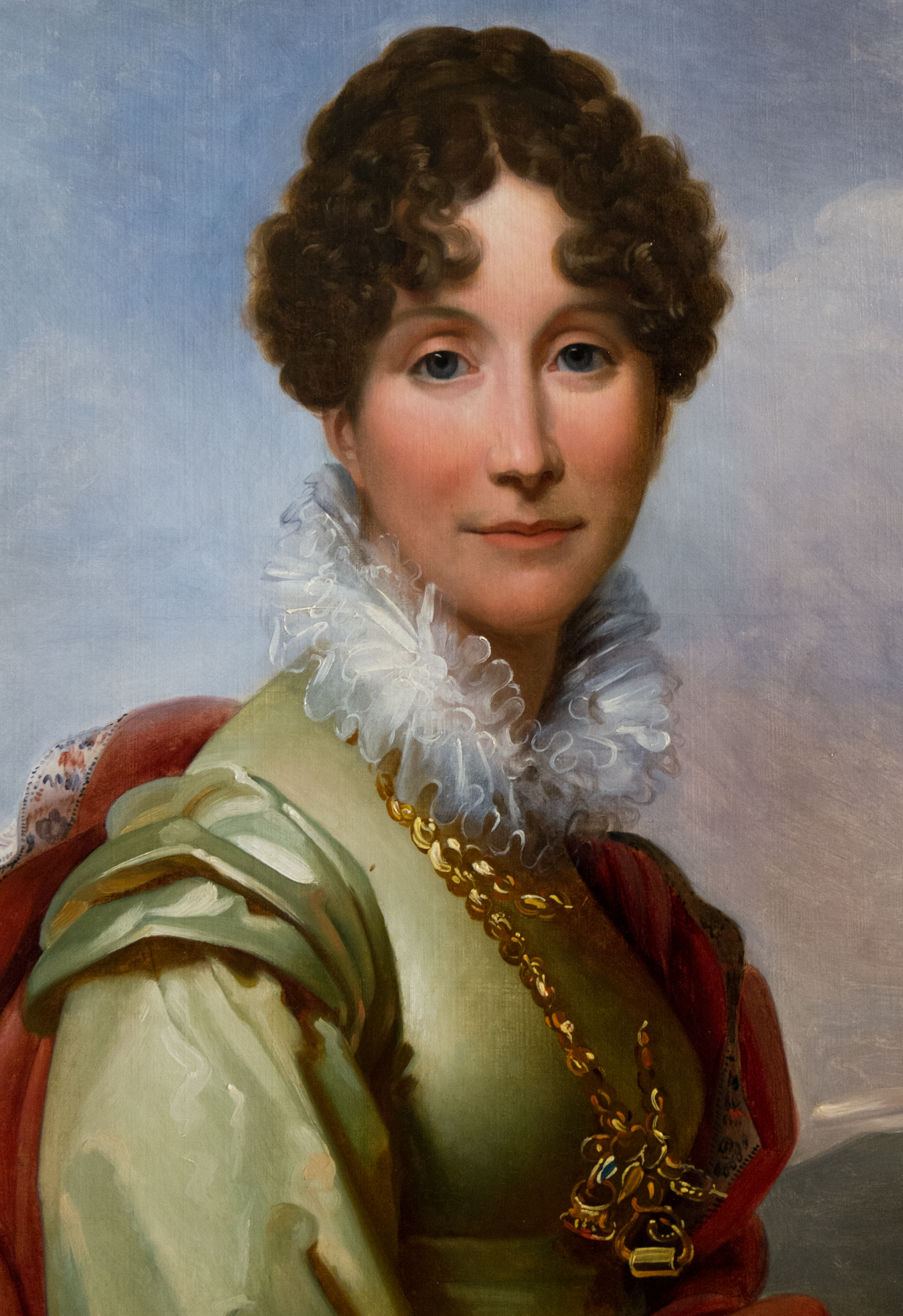
Adélaïde of Orléans

After the Revolution, in 1814 the estate was restored to the Duke of Penthièvre's daughter, Marie-Adélaïde de Bourbon, who in 1769 had married Louis Philippe II, Duke of Orléans. Their daughter Princess Adélaïde of Orléans inherited the estate and built the present château on the site of the old castle. In her will she left it to her godson, François d'Orléans, Prince of Joinville. During World War I the château became the Hôpital Temporaire d'Arc-en-Barrois, an emergency evacuation hospital for injured soldiers from the French 3rd Army Corps.

== Architecture ==
The present château was built around 1845. The fabric of the main building and the grand staircase date from the time when Nicolas de L'Hospital owned the castle in the seventeenth century, but the house underwent major changes in the 1840s when it was rebuilt by Adelaide of Orleans. The front part of the house and the English-style landscape garden belong to this period.

Furniture from the château may be marked feu: LB surmounted by a crown or ARC.

== Gallery ==
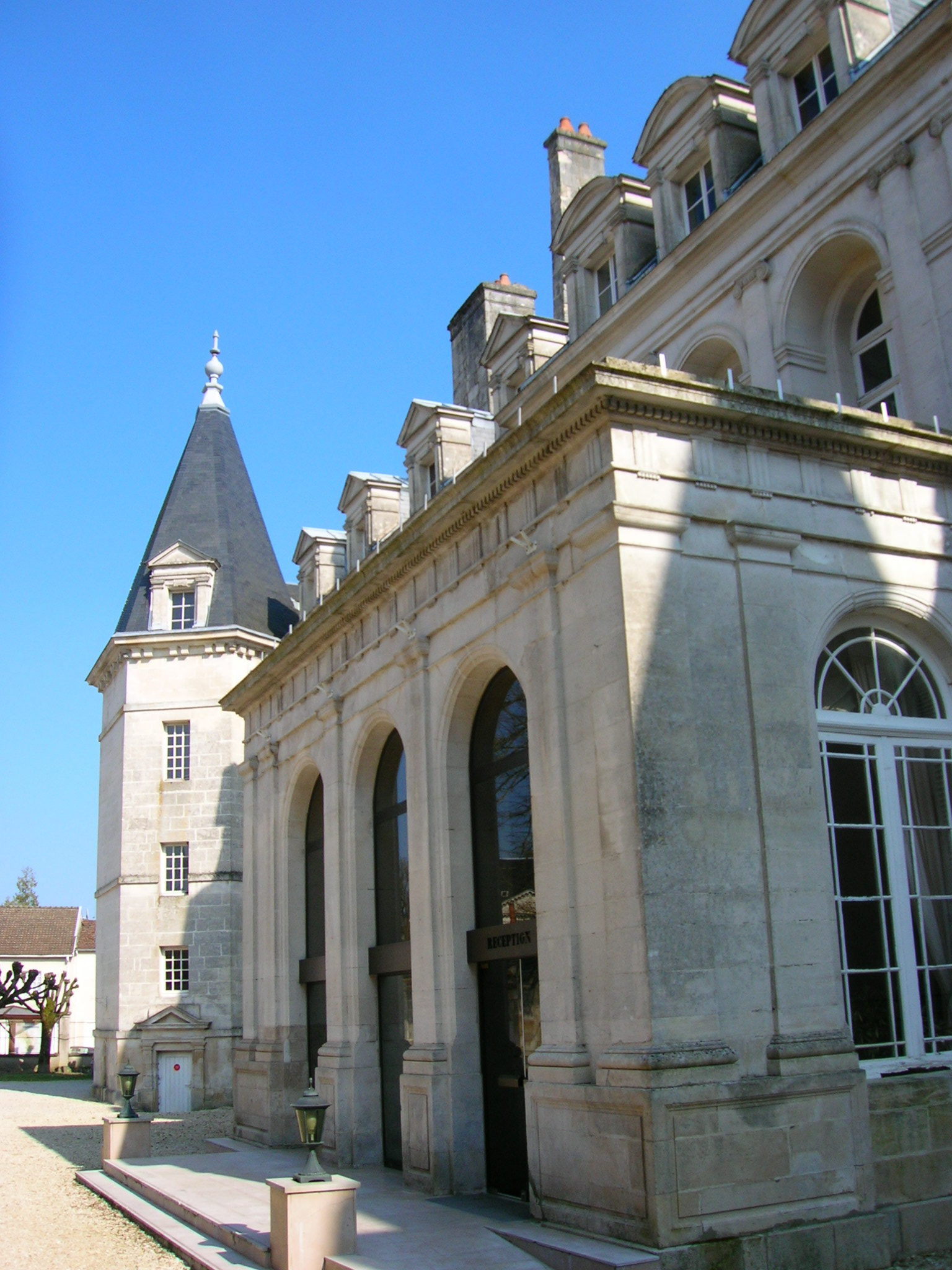
Entrance front

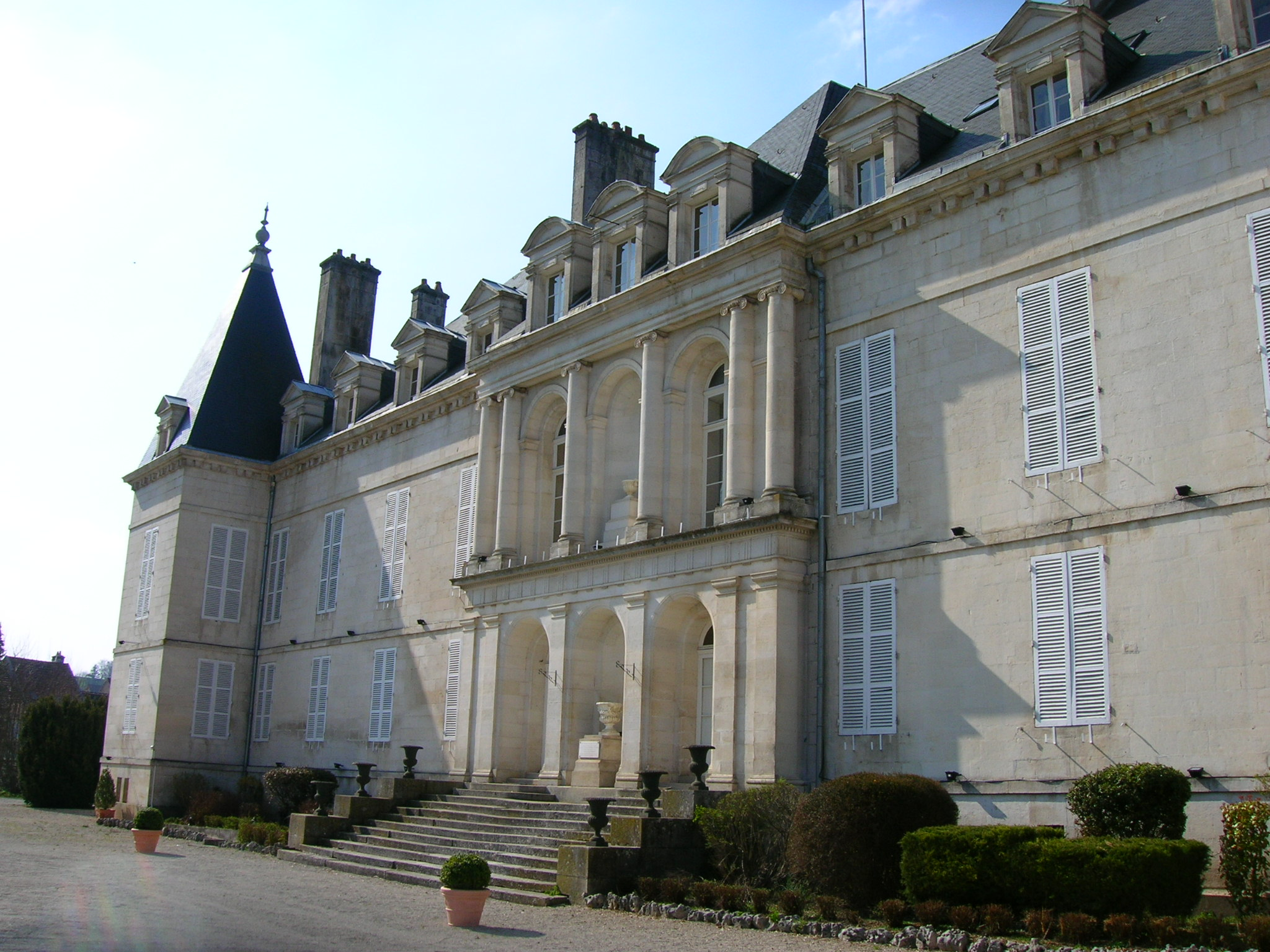
Garden front

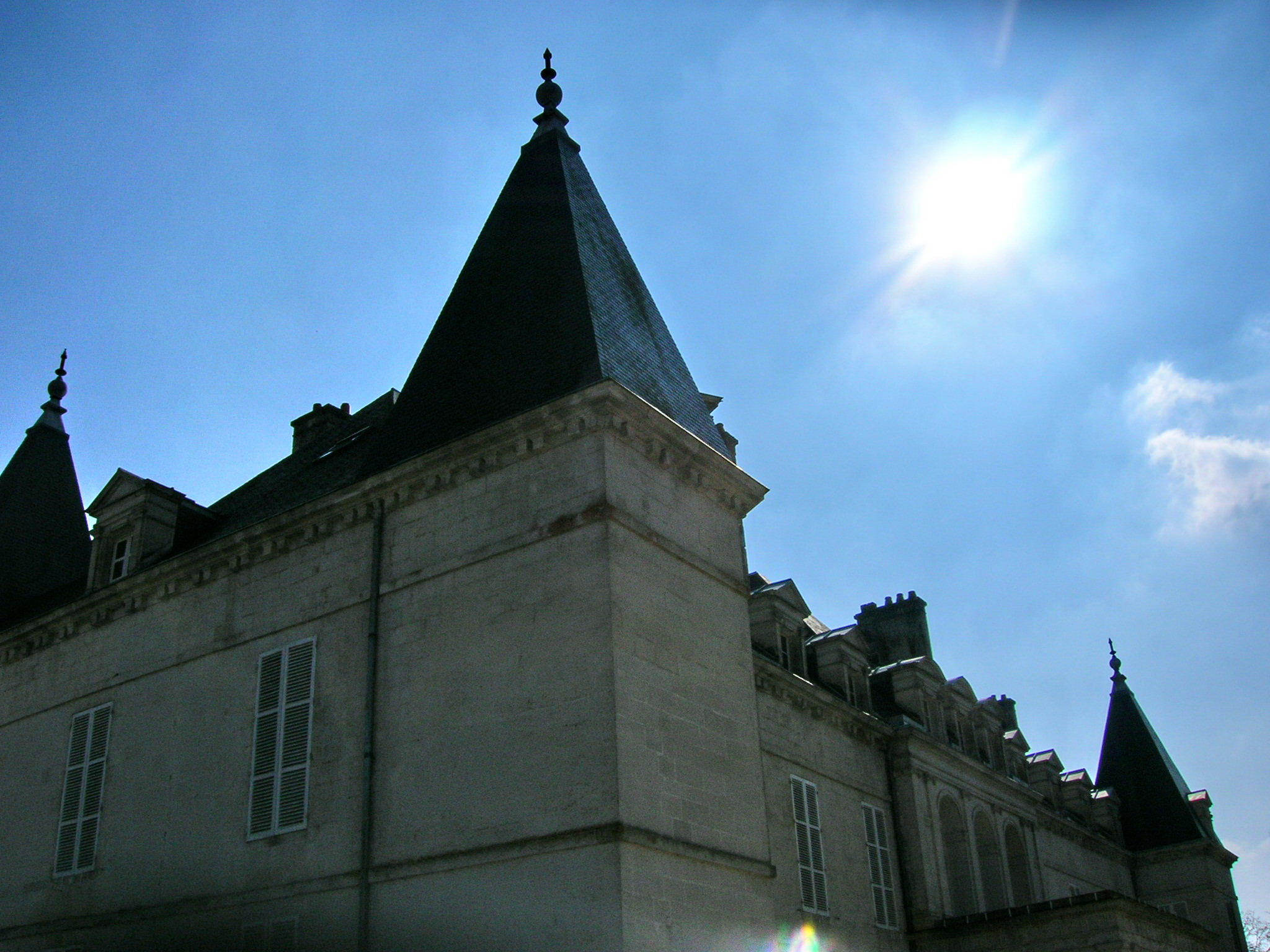
The roof
