= Étienne Jean Bouchu =

French ironworks expert and manufacturer (1714-1773)

- Born: 23 May 1714; Langres
- Died: 5 September 1773 (aged 59); Arc-en-Barrois (Champagne region)
- Spouse: Antoinette Nicole Becquet

Étienne Jean Bouchu (23 May 1714 – 5 September 1773) was a French ironworks expert and manufacturer.

== Life ==
Bouchu collaborated to the Descriptions des Arts et Métiers and to the Encyclopédie by Diderot for which he wrote the article Grosses forges.

His father was Pierre Bouchu and his mother Jeanne Goix, probably from the family of Goix Vauclair. After his marriage with Antoinette Nicole Becquet (ca.1725-1785), the daughter of an ironworks master from Arc-en-Barrois in 1744, he became ironworks master himself.

He distinguished himself in natural sciences and created many friends among scholars. He made many experiments on iron and analyzed a large number of iron ore from all of Europe.

=== Man of letters ===
Bouchu was the author of all the articles of the Encyclopédie on the production of iron, although they were not signed. He was in relation with the philosophers of the Encyclopédie, a member of the Académie de Dijon and correspondent of the French Academy of Sciences.

He also published an important book on iron in collaboration with Gaspard de Courtivron: Descriptions des arts et métiers, faites ou approuvées par Messieurs de l'Académie royale des sciences de Paris 1771-1783.

=== Descendants ===
He died in Arc-en-Barrois September 5, 1773 and is buried in the Saint-Hubert Chapel, where the family had a right on spoiler grave. He left two son, Victor and Thomas, who would be close to Gabriel Peignot. Both were mayors of Arc-en-Barrois: Thomas Bouchu from 1789 to 1791 and from 1791 and Victor Bouchu from 1791 to l'an IV and from 25 Germinal an VIII to l'an X. He also left two daughters, Frances and Catherine (1753 -1798), who married Louis Thomassin Montbel.
