= Académie des Sciences, Arts et Belles-Lettres de Dijon =

Coordinates: 47.3193°N 5.0423°E

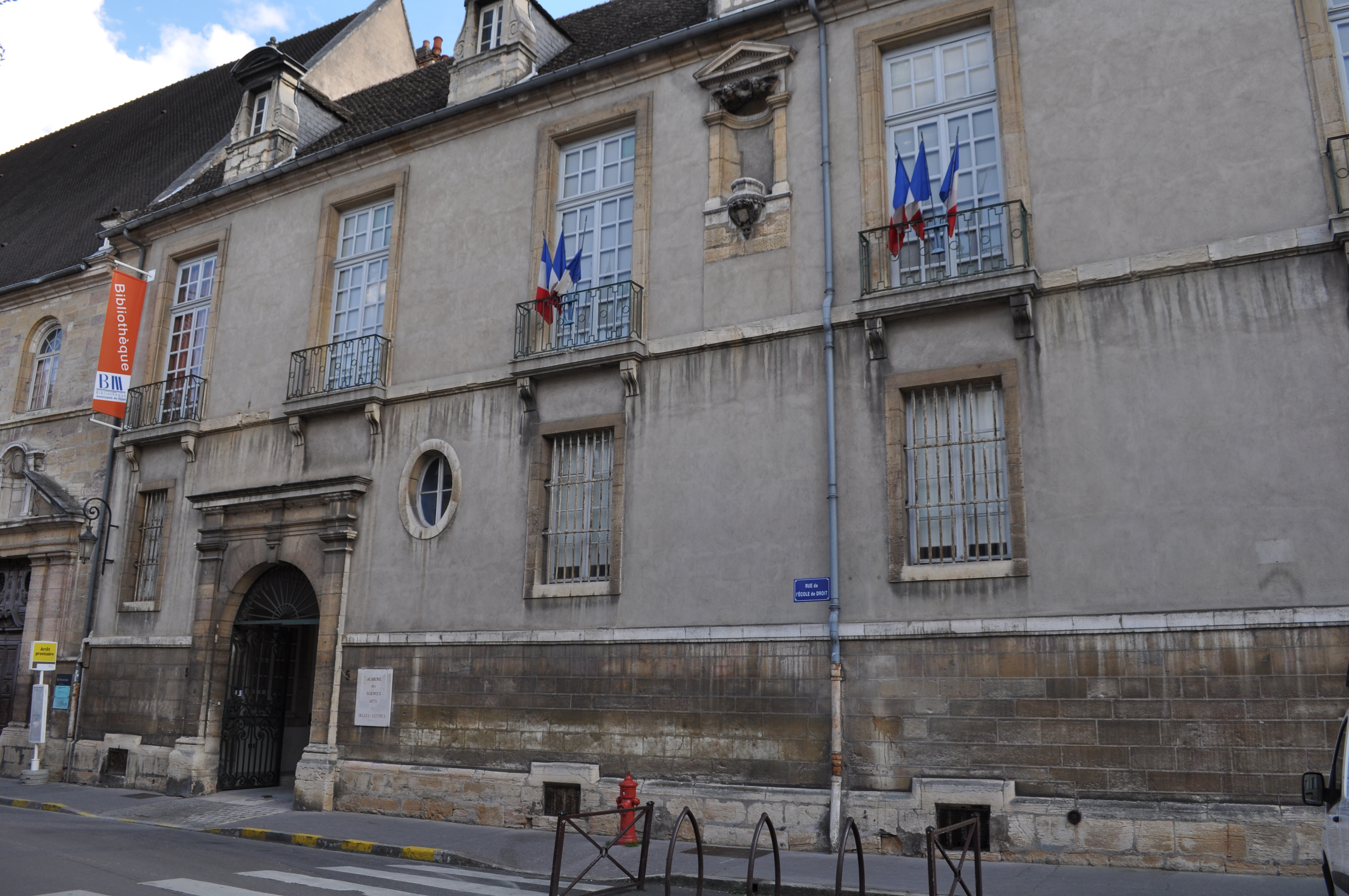
Façade of the Académie (2012)

The Académie de Dijon was founded by Hector-Bernard Pouffier, the most senior member of the Parlement de Bourgogne, in 1725. It received royal lettres patentes in 1740. In 1775, it became the "Académie des Sciences, Arts et Belles-Lettres de Dijon." From 1855 to 1869, it was called the "Académie Impériale des Sciences, Arts et Belles-Lettres de Dijon", before returning in 1870 to the name "Académie des Sciences, Arts et Belles-Lettres de Dijon."

In July 1750, it sponsored a prize competition on the question of "whether the reestablishment of the sciences and the arts contributed to purifying morals." Jean-Jacques Rousseau won the prize by arguing in the negative, in his Discourse on the Arts and Sciences. In 1754, he again competed for the prize with his Discourse on the Origin and Basis of Inequality Among Men, but did not win the prize that year.

The Académie des Sciences, Arts et Belles-Lettres de Dijon still exists, and still offers the prize.

== Notable members ==
- Charles de Brosses
- Alexis Piron
- Paul Cunisset-Carnot
- Charles Bonnet, naturalist,
- Étienne Jean Bouchu
- Maurice Deslandres
- François de Neufchâteau (1750–1828)
- Louis-Bernard Guyton de Morveau
- Pierre Lacroute
- Stéphen Liégeard
- Hugues Maret
- Lucien Olivier, physician
- Robert Poujade (honorary member)
- Jean-Philippe Rameau
- Gaston Roupnel
- Pierre Quarré
