= Alexis Piron =

French dramatist

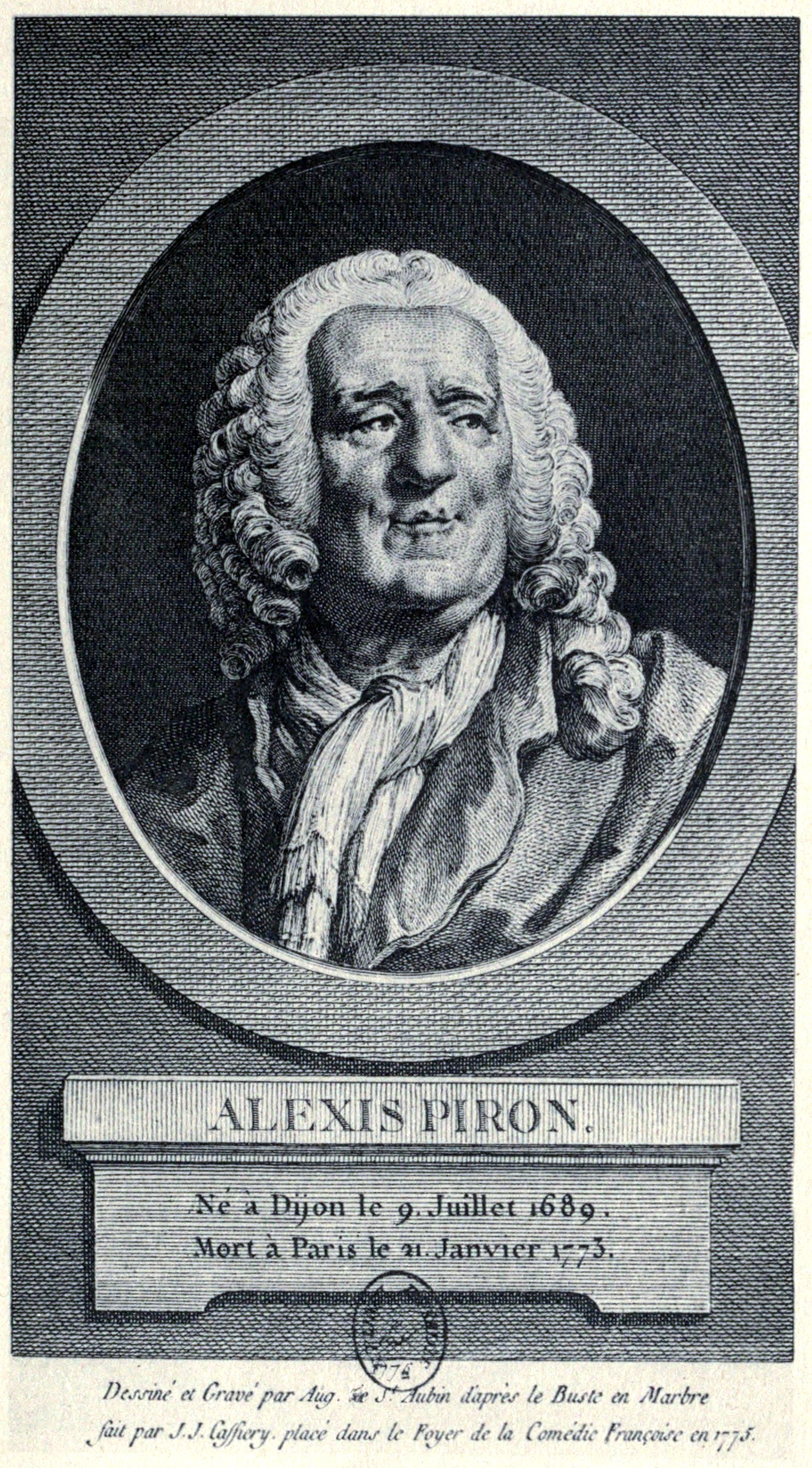

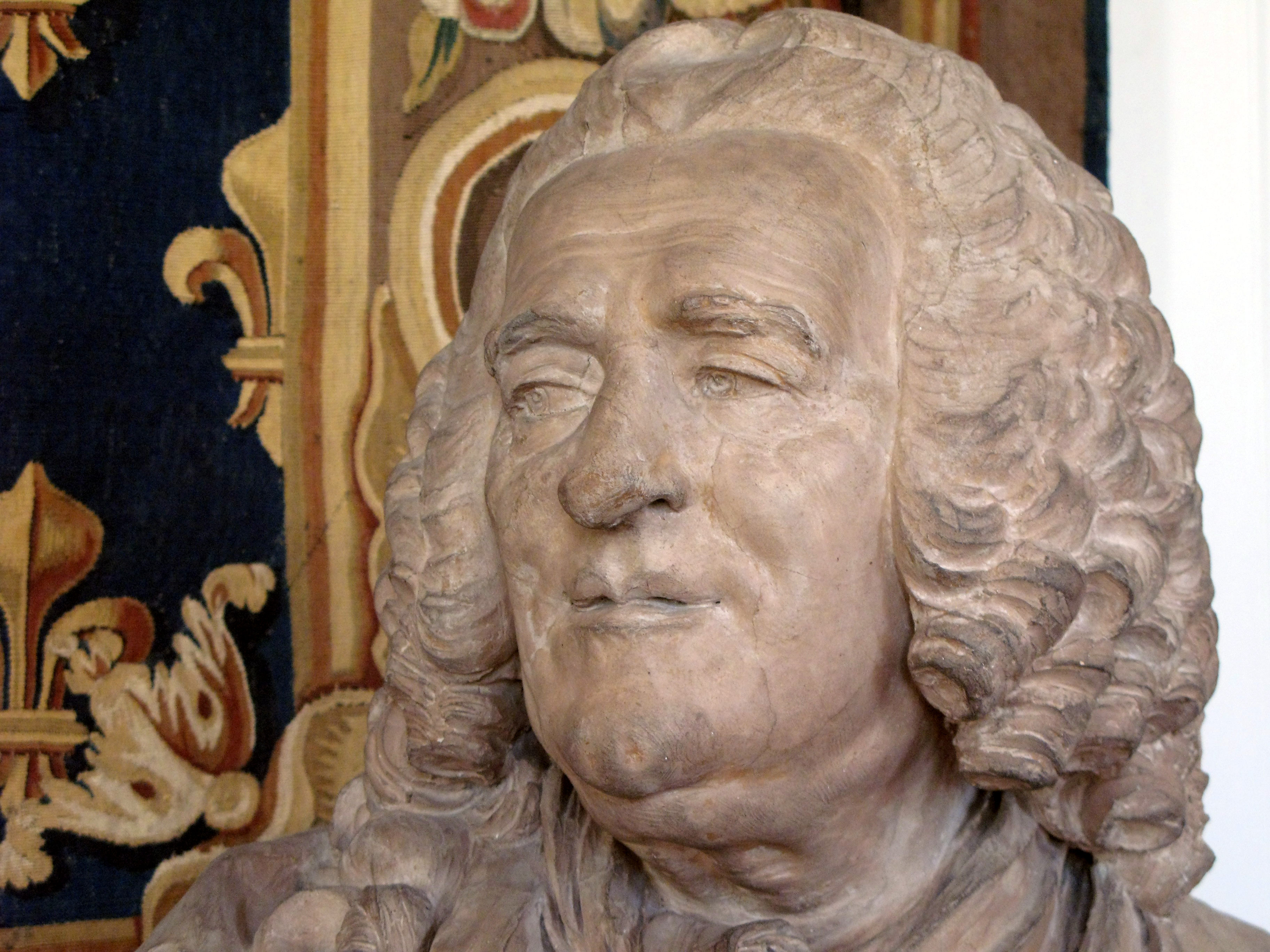
Alexis Piron, by Jacques Caffieri.

Alexis Piron (9 July 1689 – 21 January 1773) was a French epigrammatist and dramatist.

== Life ==
Alexis Piron was born in Dijon, Province of Burgundy, where his father, Aimé Piron, was an apothecary. Piron senior wrote verse in the Burgundian language. Alexis began life as clerk and secretary to a banker, and then studied law. In 1719, when nearly thirty years old, he went to Paris, where an accident brought him money and notoriety. The jealousy of the regular actors produced an edict restricting the Théâtre de la Foire, or licensed booths at fair times, to a single character on the stage. None of the ordinary writers for this theatre would attempt a monologue-drama for the purpose, and Piron made a great success with a piece called Arlequin Deucalion, representing Deucalion immediately after the Deluge, amusing himself with recreating in succession the different types of man.

In 1728 he produced Les Fils ingrats (known later as L'Ecole des pères) at the Comédie-Française. He attempted tragedy in Callisthene (1730), Gustave Vasa (1733) and Fernand Cortes (1744), but none of these succeeded, and Piron returned to comedy with La Metromanie (1738), in which the hero, Damis, suffers from the verse mania.

His most intimate associates at this time were Mademoiselle Quinault, the actress, and her friend Marie Thérèse Quénaudon, known as Mlle de Bar. This lady was slightly older than Piron and not beautiful, but after twenty years' acquaintance he married her in 1741. He was elected in 1753 to the Académie française, but his enemies raked up a certain Ode à Priape, dating from his early days, and induced Louis XV to interpose his veto. Piron was nevertheless given a pension, and during the last fifty years of his life was never in want. His best title to remembrance lies in his epigrams. The burlesque epitaph on himself, in which he ridicules the Academy—"Ci-gît Piron qui ne fut rien/Pas même académicien" "Here lies Piron, who was nothing,/Not even a member of the [French] Academy"—is well-known, among many others. Friedrich Melchior, baron von Grimm called him a "machine a saillies." He was later (1762) elected to membership in the Académie des Sciences, Arts et Belles-Lettres de Dijon.

Piron published his own theatrical works in 1758, and after his death his friend and literary executor, Rigoley de Juvigny, published his Œuvres completes. M. Bonhomme produced a critical edition in 1859, completed by Poésies choisies et pièces inédites in 1879.

Piron is compared to the Elder in The Brothers Karamazov by Fyodor Pavlovich as a compliment of wit.
