= Franklin Adams =

Franklin Adams may refer to:

- Franklin O. Adams (1881–1967), architect in Tampa, Florida
- Franklin P. Adams (1881–1960), American columnist
- Franklin Robert Adams (1933–1990), American science fiction writer

== See also ==
- 1925 Franklin-Adams, main belt asteroid
- Frank Adams (disambiguation)
