= Charles de Brosses =

18th-century French historian and linguist

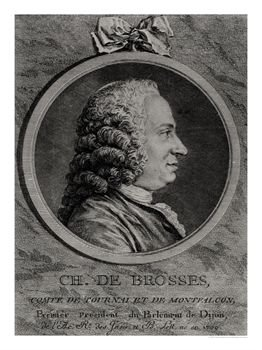
Engraved portrait of de Brosses

Charles de Brosses (French: [də bʁɔs]), comte de Tournay, baron de Montfalcon, seigneur de Vezins et de Prevessin (7 February 1709 – 7 May 1777), was a French scholar of the 18th century.

== Life ==
He was president of the parliament of his hometown Dijon from 1741, a member of the Académie des Inscriptions et Belles-Lettres from 1746, and a member of the Académie des Sciences, Arts et Belles-Lettres de Dijon from 1761. He was a close friend of Georges-Louis Leclerc de Buffon, the naturalist who wrote the Histoire Naturelle, and a personal enemy of Voltaire, the famous philosopher, who barred his entry in the Académie française in 1770. Because he opposed the absolute power of the king, he was exiled twice, in 1744 and 1771. He wrote numerous academic papers on topics concerning ancient history and language, some of which were used by Denis Diderot and D'Alembert in the Encyclopédie (1751–1765).

He died in Paris in 1777.

== Publications ==
De Brosses published five books:

- Lettres sur l'état actuel de la ville souterraine d'Herculée et sur les causes de son ensevelissement sous les ruines du Vésuve (1750). This contains a list of archeological discoveries from the excavation of Herculaneum, including some ancient inscriptions in the Oscan language.
- Histoire des navigations aux terres australes, contenant ce que l'on sait des moeurs et des productions des contrées découvertes jusqu'à ce jour (1756). This offers a complete digest of all known voyages to the Southern seas, preceded by a long plea for an exploration campaign in these waters, in order to discover and exploit the vast Austral continent which could not fail to be there, for mechanical reasons. It proved extremely useful to James Cook with respect to the discovery of Australia in 1770, and contains what may be the first occurrence of the words "Polynésie" (Polynesia) and "Australasie" (Australasia). It has been written that it is this book which convinced the French explorer Louis-Antoine de Bougainville, then a soldier in Canada, to become a sailor and, in his own terms, "do something great".
- Du culte des dieux fétiches ou Parallèle de l'ancienne religion de l'Egypte avec la religion actuelle de Nigritie (1760). This provides a materialistic theory of the origin of religion, and represents one of the first theoretical works in the discipline of ethno-anthropology. Notably it contains the first historical occurrence of the word "fétichisme", later borrowed by Karl Marx in 1842 and used in his Capital (1867).
- Traité de la formation méchanique des langues et des principes physiques de l'étymologie (1765). This provides a materialistic theory of the origin and the evolution of language, where the meaning of words is considered as an image of the physiological articulation of sounds (see Sound Symbolism). It had an influence on Condillac's Grammaire (1775) and a very important role in the birth of a scientific conception of language.
- Histoire de la République romaine, dans le cours du VIIe siècle, par Salluste, en partie traduite du latin sur l'original, en partie rétablie et composée sur les fragmens qui sont restés de ses livres perdus (1777). This is a French translation of Sallust's Historia, partially restored with the help of ancient fragments, and illustrated with topographical maps and archaeological founds.

De Brosses is also remembered for his posthumously published letters:

- L'Italie il y a cent ans, ou Lettres écrites d'Italie à quelques amis en 1739 et 1740 (1836). This book is a collection of cultured, witty, open-minded letters, sent by De Brosses to his friends in Dijon during his travels in Italy of 1739-1740. It was loved by Alexander Pushkin and Stendhal.

The first English translation of Du culte des dieux fétiches will be published in The Returns of Fetishism: Charles De Brosses and the Afterlives of an Idea in June 2017.
