= Kalpakam Swaminathan =

- Born: 15 August 1922; Sethalapathy, Thiruvarur district, India
- Died: 6 April 2011 (aged 88)
- Genre: Indian classical music
- Occupation: Veenai player
- Instrument: Veenai

Kalpakam Swaminathan (15 August 1922 – 6 April 2011) was a vainika (veena player) of Carnatic music.

== Profile ==
Kalpakam was born in Sethalapathi village in the Tiruvarur district of Tamil Nadu, India. Her mother Abhayambal initiated her into the world of Carnatic music when she was eight years of age. Her tutelage continued under such prominent artists as Kallidaikuruchi Ananthakrishna Iyer, TL Venkatarama Iyer, Musiri Subramania Iyer, Budalur Krishnamurthy Shastrigal, Tiger Varadachariar and Mysore Vasudevachar.

Her veena technique followed the Thanjavur baani or style which is characterized by its strong commitment to producing musical graces (gamakas) in the manner they would be rendered vocally. She had a vast repertoire of Muthuswami Dikshitar's compositions, including those from the Abhayamba, Kamalamba, Neelotpalamba and Thyagaraja vibhakti series, Vara kritis and Panchalinga series. She is considered an authority in her renditions of this composer's work. She also performed together with Gottuvadyam doyen Budalur Krishnamurthy Sastrigal on many occasions.

She was brought into the teaching profession by 'Tiger' Varadachariar. He inducted her into the teaching faculty at Kalakshetra, where she spent many years in the 1940s and 1950s. From 1964 she taught at the Tamil Nadu Government Music College (formerly Central College of Carnatic Music). She retired as a full professor in 1980. She brought up many students like Smt. Kamala Ashwathama (mother of Veenai E.Gayatri), Nirmala Rajasekar, Subadra, S. R. Padmavathi, Sujatha (Madurai AIR), L. Ramakrishnan, V. Hemalatha, Vijayalakshmi Viswanathan, K. Saraswathi Vasudev.

== Awards ==
Notable awards include the Kalaimamani title from the Government of Tamil Nadu, Sangeet Natak Akademi Award from the President of India, Sangeetha Kala Acharya title of the Madras Music Academy, Sangeetha Seva Nirata awarded by Sree Thyagaraja Vidwat Samajam, Acharya Choodamani from Sri Krishna Gana Sabha in August 2005 and the Veene Sheshanna Award in July 2008.
