= Reena Esmail =

American pianist and composer

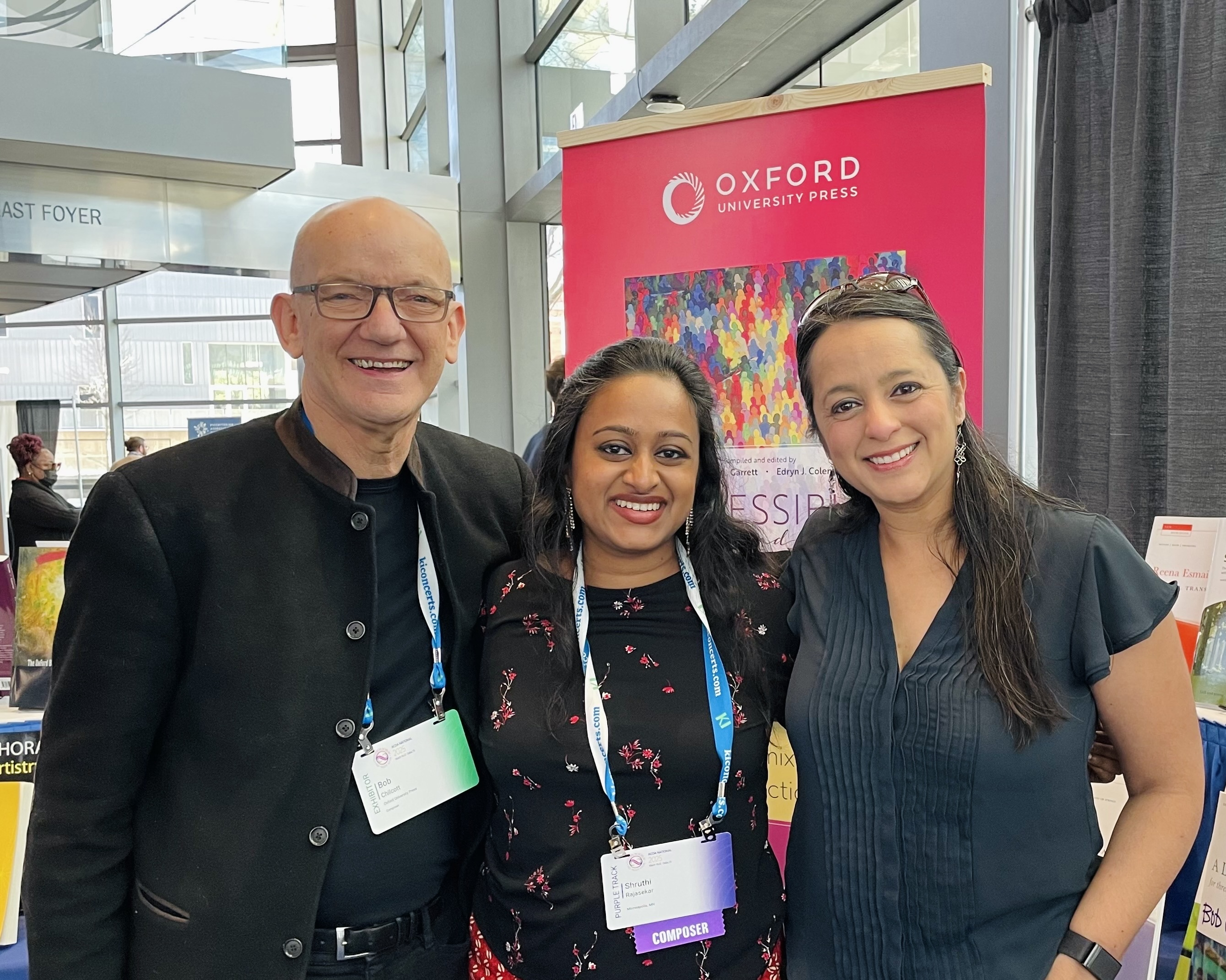
Bob Chilcott, Shruthi Rajasekar and Reena Esmail

Reena Esmail (born 11 February 1983) is an Indian-American composer of Indian and Western classical music. She strives to create equitable musical spaces by bridging the gap between the two classical music traditions.

Esmail has been commissioned to compose pieces for ensembles including Amherst College Choir and Orchestra, Santa Fe Pro Musica, Conspirare, and the Los Angeles Master Chorale.

Composer Andrew Norman selected her work for violin Darshan for a 2020 feature in The New York Times, calling it "familiar and fresh, intimate and epic, grounded and aloft."

== Career ==
Esmail has been the composer-in-residence with the Seattle Symphony, Los Angeles Master Chorale, Tanglewood Music Center, Spoleto Festival, and Marlboro Music Festival.

Notable ensembles that have commissioned work from Esmail have included the Philadelphia Orchestra, San Francisco Symphony, Kronos Quartet, Imani Winds, Viano Quartet, Baltimore Symphony, Richmond Symphony, Albany Symphony, Chicago Sinfonietta, River Oaks Chamber Orchestra, San Francisco Girls Choir, Conspirare, Brooklyn Rider, and Yale Institute of Sacred Music.

She is the co-founder and Artistic Director of Shastra, a non-profit organization that connects Indian musical tradition with the West.

== Compositional style ==
Esmail only began to become a "truly syncretic composer" when she received a Fulbright-Nehru Scholarship to North India to study the Hindustani musical tradition. After returning from a year in India, Esmail's goal became to bridge the gap between Indian and Western music.

She wrote Tasveer as her debut composition, beginning to "scratch the surface of the ideas and concepts that now form the backbone of the music". This was her first attempt at creating music that captured the essence and ornamentation of Hindustani music.

Esmail continued to explore these Eastern influences in pieces like her String Quartet (Ragamala). Every movement starts with a soft drone, mimicking the audience humming Esmail heard at performances she attended during her year in India when each raag was introduced. These drones are meant to evoke the close bond between the audience and the performer.

=== Influences ===
Esmail often cites the French composer Maurice Ravel as a major influence. She discovered that she could better comprehend Hindustani music by using the color, texture, and freedom of 19th-century French classical music, which had drawn her in as a piano student.

Esmail has written:

"My life was completely transformed when I heard Samuel Barber's Knoxville: Summer of 1915 for the first time. At the age of fourteen, I was sitting under the stars with my parents at the stunning Ford Theater in Los Angeles on a summer night. I could relate to the child's voice narrating the piece's text because I was so aware of the vast, complicated world I was witnessing, even through my young eyes. I'm just attempting to analyze everything. I can identify that particular performance as a turning point in my decision to pursue a career in music. All I wanted was to be able to produce such beauty."

Esmail achieved one of her early musical goals when she composed her Piano Trio in 2019. Each of the trio's movements include genuine raags. A sensation of improvisational freedom and timelessness is created by the slow movement's continuous flutters, slides, and harmonics. The third movement Scherzo is reminiscent of Shostakovich's comedy and Mendelssohn's elfin characteristics. Combining these western influences with Indian traditional elements, Esmail has developed her own unique musical vocabulary.

Her commitment to blending traditions is emphasized in her piece Khirkiyaan: Three Transformations for Brass Quintet. Named for the Hindi word for "windows", Esmail uses this brass quintet as three "windows" into her pieces of music. Every movement reimagines a previous work by Esmail for a brass quintet. The opening movement, Jog, is from her string quartet Ragamala. Her song cycle for guitar and mezzo soprano serves as the basis for the second movement, Joota. The third movement, Tuttarana, was first composed for a female choir. The Italian tutti and tarana, a Hindi composition that might be best rendered as the jazz phrase "scat," is the origin of this final title.

== Works ==
Esmail composes for orchestra, solo instrument, chamber ensemble, and voice.

=== Solo ===
- Chardonnay, for solo flute (2001)
- Take What You Need, for unaccompanied violin (2016)
- Hallelujah (arr. of Leonard Cohen), unaccompanied violin (2017)
- Darshan, unaccompanied violin (2018-2020)
- Drishti (द्रिष्ती), miniatures for unaccompanied violin (2021)

=== Chamber works ===
- Piano Quintet, for two violins, viola, cello, and piano (2010)
- Tasveer, for clarinet, violin, cello, and piano (2012)
- Jhula Jhule, for violin and piano (2013)
- String Quartet (Ragamala), for two violins, viola, and cello (2013)
- I Wonder as I Wander, for piano, violin, and cello (2014)
- Nadiya, version for violin and bassoon (2016)
- Saans (Breath), for violin, cello, and piano (2017)
- The Light is the Same, for woodwind quintet (flute + piccolo, oboe, clarinet, horn, bassoon) or piano trio (piano, flute, oboe) (2017)
- Khirkiyaan: Three Transformations for Brass Quintet, for two trumpets, horn, trombone, and tuba (2017)
- Blaze, for violin and tabla (2019)
- Piano Trio, for violin, cello, and piano (2019)
- Meri Sakhi Ki Avaaz (My Sister's Voice) for soprano voice, Hindustani vocalist, piano, two violins, viola, cello
- The History of Red, for mezzo soprano voice, piano, violin, and cello (2020)
- Interglow, for string quartet, flute, piano, and community voices (2020)
- Dhire, Dhire, for piano, violin, cello, and soprano voice (2022)

=== Orchestral and choral works ===
- Barso Re, for Yale Sur et Veritaal, Yale's Hindi a cappella organization (2010)
- Concerto for You, solo violin and youth string orchestra (2019)
- Terra Infirma, harp, percussion (2025) Written for Yolanda Kondonassis and the Interlochen Arts Academy Orchestra
- Double Concerto, violin, piano, and orchestra (2026) Written for Gil Shaham, Orli Shaham, and the National Symphony Orchestra

== Honors and awards ==
- United States Artist Fellow in Music 2019
- S&R Foundation Washington Award Grand Prize 2019
- Kennedy Center for the Performing Arts Citizen Artist Fellow 2017-2018
- Two ASCAP Morton Gould Young Composer Awards (2002, 2007)
- Walter Hinrichsen Award from the American Academy of Arts and Letters 2012
- INK Fellow 2011
- Winner in the MTAC-WLA Chamber Music Competition for piano performance
- Fulbright-Nehru Student Research Scholar 2011-2012

== Other Work ==
=== Talks and Interviews ===
In 2020, she delivered the commencement address for graduates of The Colburn School in Los Angeles.
