= Francis Colburn Adams =

American novelist

Francis Colburn Adams (1850–1891) was an American miscellaneous writer, formerly living in Charleston, South Carolina, who wrote under various pseudonyms.

== Bibliography ==
- Manuel Pereiera; or, The Sovereign Rule of South Carolina: with Views of Southern Laws, Life, and Hospitality, Washington, 1853, 12mo.
- Uncle Tom at Home, &c, Phila., 1853.
- Our World; or, The Democrat's Rule. By Justia, a Know-Nothing. Lon., 1855, 2 vols, p. 8vo.
- Justice in the By-Ways: a Tale of Life, 1856, 12mo.
- Life and Adventures of Major Roger Sherman Potter. By Pheleg Van Truesdale. N. York, 1858.
- An Outcast: a Novel, N. York, 1861, 12mo.
- The Story of a Trooper; with much concerning the Campaign on the Peninsula, (1861–1862,) N. York, 1865, 12mo.
- Siege of Washington for Little People. Illust. Plila., 1867, sq. 12mo
- The Von Toodleburgs; or, The Memoirs of a Very Distinguished Family. Illust. Phila., 1868, sq. 12mo.
- The Washers and Scrubbers. The Men Who Robbed Them. Washington, D. C.; Judd & Detweiler, 1878.
