= Frank Adam =

Flemish writer

- Born: 18 August 1968 (age 56); Bruges
- Occupation: Playwright

Website
- www.frankadam.be

Frank Adam (18 August 1968) is a Flemish author, mostly writing plays and philosophical works. He began writing in 1992 and is a member of the editorial team of the Dutch-language literary periodical De Brakke Hond and in addition, he is a teacher at the writers academy in Bruges.

Adam studied Arabic, Ancient Greek, Germanic languages, and literature.

== Career ==
He began his writing career in 2001 with the book Waarom ik altijd née zeg ("Why I always say no") to answer his son Dante. His 2002 book, Mijn mond eet graag spinazie maar ik niet ("My mouth eats spinach alright, but not me") looks through a child's eyes at the bizarre world of grown ups. This book was also turned into a children's play. De passie van de puber ("The passion of a teenager") received the Knokke-Heist prize for best children's book of 2006.

== Published works ==
- Waarom ik altijd née zeg (2001, Querido)
- Mijn mond eet graag spinazie maar ik niet (2002, Querido)
- Vensters, uitzichten op poëzie en muziek (2002, Davidsfonds/Infodok)
- Het grote Zwinvoorleesboek (2004, Davidsfonds/Infodok)
- Wakitchaga : de dood is een jager (1992, De Geus) – children's play
- Waterman (1993, De Geus) – Novel for adults
- Sjirk, boek aan de Hebreeën (1999, De arbeiderspers) – Novel for adults
- Wat de ezel zag / Klaas Verplancke (ill.) (2003, Davidsfonds/Infodok)
- De passie van de puber (2006, Davidsfonds/Infodok)
- De Caïro Cahiers (2007, Davidsfonds/Literair)
- Confidenties aan een ezelsoor deel twee: De Wereld (2007, Davidsfonds/Infodok)
- Als de bomen straks gaan rijden/ Milja Praagman (ill.) (2011, De Eenhoorn Bvba)
