= Frank Adams (illustrator) =

Frank Adams (1871–1944) was a British illustrator and landscape artist.

By the 1900s, Adams was an established picture book illustrator, his style influenced by members of the London Sketch Club, especially Cecil Aldin and John Hassall. He worked frequently with Blackie & Son Ltd. He exhibited watercolours and drawings at Walker's Gallery, London, 1923–1935.

During World War I, Adams was one of the British artists who volunteered to look after wounded French soldiers at the Hôpital Temporaire d'Arc-en-Barrois.

== Publications ==
=== Children's books ===
- The Frank Adams Book of Nursery Rhymes
- Old Time Jingles (Blackie & Son Ltd)
- Old Time Rhymes (Blackie & Son Ltd)
- The Story of Old Mother Hubbard and Her Dog (Blackie & Son Ltd)
- The Beautiful Book of Nursery Rhymes, Stories and Pictures (Blackie & Son Ltd)
- The Frog He Would A-Wooing Go (1900)
- Three Old Favourites: the story of Jack Sprat, Tom the Piper and the Frog who would a-wooing go
- My Nursery Story Book (Blackie & Son Ltd)
- Lewis Carroll, Alice in Wonderland (Blackie & Son Ltd, 1912)
- The Golden Budget of Nursery Stories (c.1930) (with John Hassall)

=== Adult books ===
- Isaac Walton, The Compleat Angler (1930)
- Thomas Gray, Elegy Written in a Country Churchyard (1931)
- Matthew Arnold, The Scholar Gypsy (1933)
- E.A. Gillie, Barbara in Brittany
- Jessie Pope, Three Jolly Huntsmen (Dodge Publishing Co., 1912) (Dodge Publishing Co., 1912)
- Alexandre Dumas, tr. A.R. Allinson, The Wolf Leader
