= Frank Adams (Canadian football) =

American gridiron football player (born 1970)

Profile
- Position: Cornerback

Personal information
- Born: November 7, 1970 (age 55); Gastonia, North Carolina, U.S.
- Listed height: 5 ft 8 in (1.73 m)
- Listed weight: 175 lb (79 kg)

Career information
- College: South Carolina

Career history
- 1995: BC Lions*
- 1995: Toronto Argonauts
- * Offseason or practice squad member only

Frank Adams (born November 7, 1970) is an American former professional football cornerback who played in the Canadian Football League. After briefly practicing with the BC Lions in the offseason, Adams was signed by the Toronto Argonauts for the 1995 season. He went on to play in three regular season games for the Argonauts, recording 16 tackles.
