= Arc-en-Barrois =

- Commune
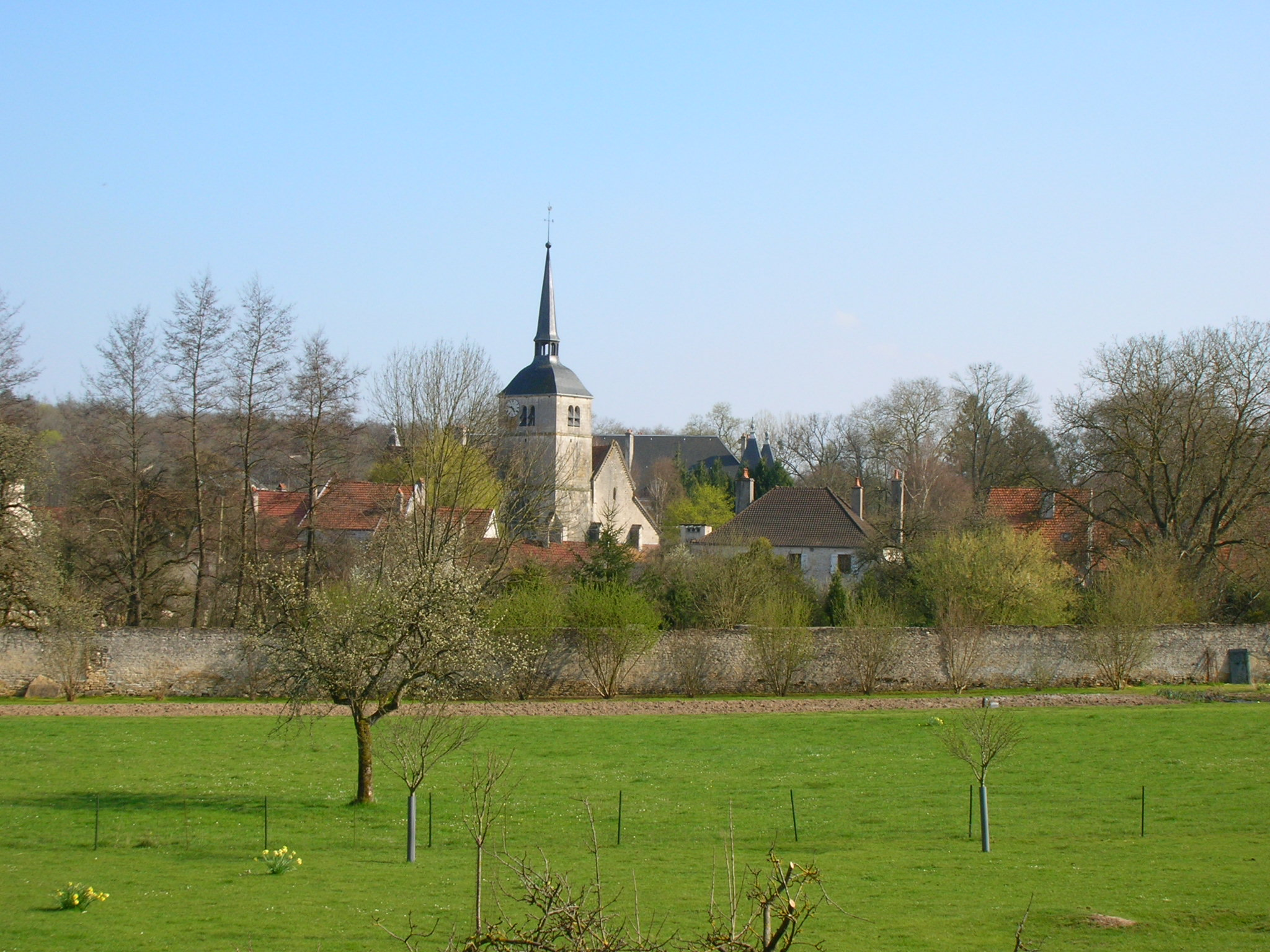
- A general view of Arc-en-Barrois

- Coat of arms
- Location of Arc-en-Barrois
- Location within France Location within Grand Est
- Coordinates: 47°56′57″N 5°00′37″E
- Country: France
- Region: Grand Est
- Department: Haute-Marne
- Arrondissement: Chaumont
- Canton: Châteauvillain
- Intercommunality: Trois Forêts

Government
  - Mayor (2020–2026): Philippe Frequelin
- Area^{1}: 50.44 km^{2} (19.47 sq mi)
- Elevation: 270 m (890 ft)
- Highest elevation: 401 m (1,316 ft)
- Lowest elevation: 262 m (860 ft)
- Population (2023): 671
  - Density: 13.3/km^{2} (34.5/sq mi)
- Time zone: UTC+01:00 (CET)
  - Summer (DST): UTC+02:00 (CEST)
- INSEE/Postal code: 52017 /52210
- ^{1} French Land Register data, which excludes lakes, ponds, glaciers > 1 km^{2} (0.386 sq mi or 247 acres) and river estuaries.

Arc-en-Barrois is a commune in the Haute-Marne department in the Grand Est region in northeastern France. The 18th-century French metallurgist and Encyclopédiste Étienne Jean Bouchu (1714–1773) died in Arc-en-Barrois.

== Geography ==
The Aujon flows northwest through the middle of the commune and crosses the town.

== Population ==
Historical population
| Year | Pop. | ±% p.a. |
|---|---|---|
| 1968 | 801 | — |
| 1975 | 808 | +0.12% |
| 1982 | 835 | +0.47% |
| 1990 | 874 | +0.57% |
| 1999 | 898 | +0.30% |
| 2007 | 773 | −1.86% |
| 2012 | 790 | +0.44% |
| 2017 | 743 | −1.22% |
| 2023 | 671 | −1.68% |
Source: INSEE

== See also ==
- Communes of the Haute-Marne department
- Château d'Arc-en-Barrois
