= Frank Adams (artist) =

American artist

Frank Adams (1914–1987) was an American artist. Starting as an engineering draftsman during World War II, he was known for book illustrations, cartoons, and paintings.

Adams is noted for The Home Front, which was first published in 1944. The book is filled with cartoons capturing the can-do spirit of men and women often working side by side for the war effort—welding, riveting, riding around on fork lifts.
