= Nirmala Rajasekar =

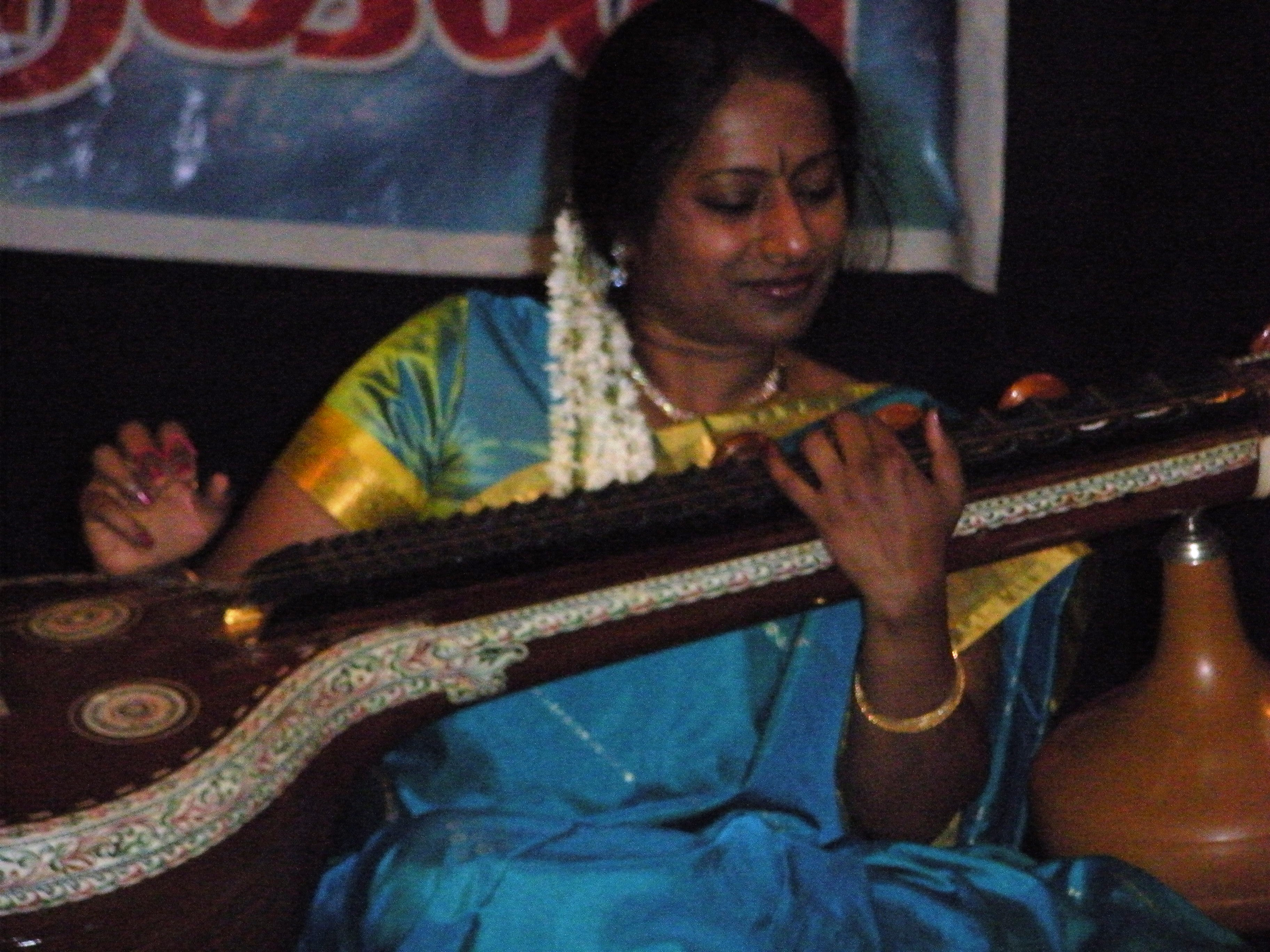
- This is a picture of Nirmala Rajasekar performing live in the prestigious Janaranjini Sabha in Kumbakonam, Tamil Nadu

Background information
- Born: 11 December
- Origin: Chennai
- Genres: Carnatic, world music
- Occupations: Musician, composer, vocalist, vainika
- Instruments: Saraswati veena
- Label: INNOVA
- Website: www.nirmalarajasekar.com

Nirmala Rajasekar is a Carnatic Saraswati veena player, composer, vocalist, and educator. One of the world's premier veena players, Rajasekar has performed at Carnegie Hall, the United Nations, the Madras Music Academy, Narada Gana Sabha, Sawai Gandharva Festival, and the Konya International Mystic Music Festival. Rajasekar is the current co-chair of the American Composers Forum.

== Early life ==
Nirmala Rajasekar began her training in the Saraswati veena at the age of 6 in Chennai with Sri Deva Kottai Narayana Iyengar and Kamala Aswathama, the mother of E. Gayathri. After moving to Bangalore, she studied at the Gana Mandira School in Basavangudi with G. Chennama and E. P. Alamelu. Rajasekar also received guidance from violinist Sri A.D. Zachariah and Veena Sri S. Balachander.

Rajasekar began her career as a soloist at the age of 13. Upon returning to Chennai, Rajasekar came under the tutelage of Saraswati veena player Kalpakam Swaminathan, with whom she trained for nearly thirty years. Through Swaminathan, Rajasekar is part of the Dikshitar shisya parampara. In Chennai and Delhi, Rajasekar studied Carnatic vocal music with Sri B. Sitarama Sarma and Prof T.R. Subramaniam, receiving a Government of India scholarship to study with the latter.

== Musical career ==
Nirmala Rajasekar has been performing and composing for over forty years. She performs traditional Carnatic repertoire as a Saraswati veena exponent and creates contemporary works through compositions and collaborations. In 2020, Rajasekar was the annual Commissioned Composer of the University of Wisconsin-River Falls, the longest-running program of its kind in the United States. Past composers include Pauline Oliveros, Morton Feldman, John Cage, Jennifer Higdon, and Julia Wolfe.

In 2007, Rajasekar's album Song of the Veena was released by Innova Recordings, and in 2010, Innova released her album Into the Raga. Rajasekar's third album with Innova, a collaborative world music album called Maithree: The Music of Friendship, was released in 2018. The album was reviewed by Songlines, WNYC New Sounds, and Jazz Weekly. Other albums include Sudha Saagara, released by Charsur Digital Workstation, and Melodic Expressions.

Rajasekar has collaborated with artists including Pt. Ronu Majumdar, Pt. Tarun Bhattacharya, Pt. Gaurav Majumdar, Sri Mysore Manjunath, Sounds of Blackness, Gao Hong, Anthony Cox, and poet Robert Bly.

Rajasekar is an A-Grade artist of All-India Radio, and has appeared on Australian Broadcasting Corporation, British Broadcasting Company, and Doordarshan Television. Since 1989, Rajasekar has been a performing artist for the Indian Council for Cultural Relations. Rajasekar has been featured at the National Music Museum and the "Beyond Bollywood" exhibit presented by the Minnesota Historical Society and the Smithsonian Institution.

Nirmala Rajasekar performing with the Metropolitan Symphony Orchestra and VocalEssence

Since 1995, Rajasekar has lived in Minnesota, USA, touring several months each year to countries such as India, Turkey, Australia, New Zealand, and Singapore. Rajasekar's daughter and student, Shruthi Rajasekar, is a composer and vocalist. In 2025, Rajasekar was featured with Thanjavur Murgaboopathi in a composition by her daughter for orchestra and choir performing with the Metropolitan Symphony Orchestra and VocalEssence.

== Positions ==
Nirmala Rajasekar is the founder and artistic director of the Naadha Rasa Center for Music, and was recognized with the Prof. T.R. Subrahmanyam Teaching Award by the Cleveland Thyagaraja Festival. She is also a COMPAS teaching artist. Rajasekar currently serves as the co-chair of the Board of the American Composers Forum and the Vice President of the Global Carnatic Musicians Association.

== Awards ==
- Kalaimamani Award from the Government of Tamil Nadu
- 2020 Annual Commissioned Composer of University of Wisconsin-River Falls
- 2018 Pratibha Puraskar ("Genius Prize") from Delhi Telugu Academy
- Vocational Excellence Award from Rotary Club International
- 2010 McKnight Fellowship
- 2006 Bush Fellowship
