= Shruthi Rajasekar =

American composer and singer of Indian descent

Shruthi Rajasekar ARNCM
- Born: November 1996 (age 29); Minnesota, USA
- Genres: Carnatic, Western classical, experimental
- Occupations: Composer, singer
- Publishers: Oxford University Press, Stainer & Bell, ABRSM, Voces8 Publishing, Murphy Music Press
- Website: www.shruthirajasekar.com

Shruthi Rajasekar is an American composer and singer of contemporary Western classical and Carnatic music. Rajasekar is a 2025 McKnight Fellow in Composition.

== Background ==
Shruthi Rajasekar was born and raised in Minnesota, USA. She is the daughter of Carnatic musician Nirmala Rajasekar and is of Indian Tamilian descent.

== Education ==
Shruthi Rajasekar graduated from Princeton University, where she studied with Donnacha Dennehy, Barbara White, Juri Seo, Dan Trueman, and Gabriel Crouch. During this time, she also studied at the Royal College of Music in London with Patricia Rozario.

Rajasekar went to the United Kingdom on a Marshall Scholarship. She pursued a postgraduate degree in ethnomusicology at SOAS, University of London with supervisor Richard Widdess. She also received her master's degree in composition at the Royal Northern College of Music.

== Career ==
Rajasekar has created new works for Seattle Pro Musica, I Fagiolini, the Yale Glee Club, the Royal Academy of Music, cellist Abel Selaocoe and The Hermes Experiment, American Guild of Organists, The Gesualdo Six, and the BBC Singers.

In 2020, BBC Music Magazine named Rajasekar a "Rising Star." In 2023, Rajasekar was made an Associate of the Royal Northern College of Music (ARNCM) for her "exceptional contributions to the profession."

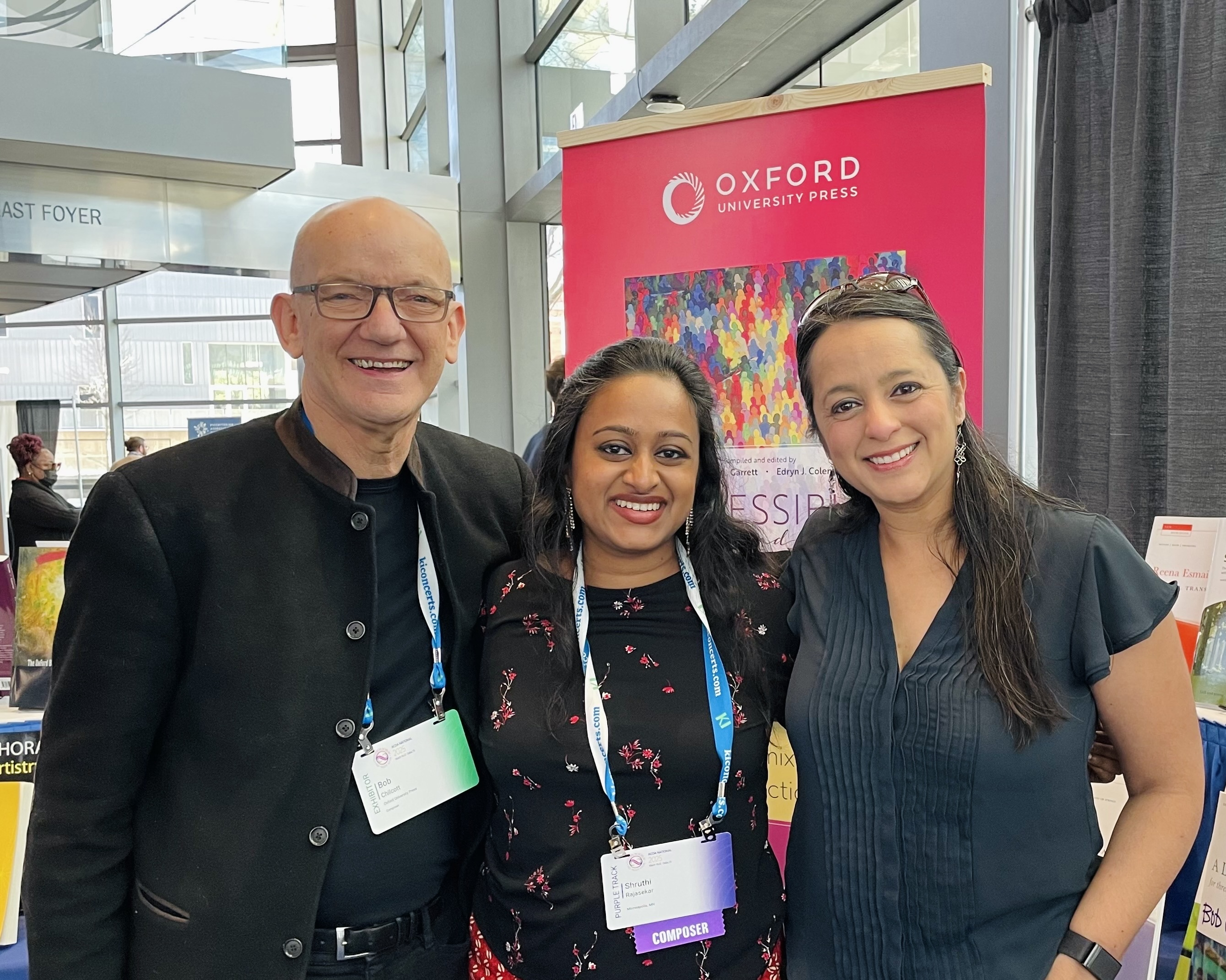
Composers Bob Chilcott, Shruthi Rajasekar, and Reena Esmail at the Oxford University Press exhibition booth, ACDA, Dallas, TX

Rajasekar was a recipient of a 2023 Jerome Hill Artist Fellowship. She holds a 2025 Artist & Culture Bearer Fellowship in Composition from the McKnight Foundation and American Composers Forum.

== Sarojini ==
In 2021, Rajasekar created a multi-movement work called Sarojini on Sarojini Naidu and the Indian Independence Movement. The work contains poetry and speeches by Naidu, including writings from "The Broken Wing" and a compilation of Naidu's texts edited by G.A. Natesan. Sarojini was premiered by Hertfordshire Chorus and conductor David Temple in 2022, in honor of the 75th anniversary of Indian Independence. In October 2025, American choir VocalEssence will perform the North American premiere of Sarojini.
