= Francis Adams (cricketer) =

Australian cricketer

Personal information
- Full name: Francis Adams
- Born: 12 February 1835; Ireland
- Died: 10 February 1911 (aged 75); New South Wales

Career statistics
Competition	First class
Matches	1
Runs scored	18
Batting average	14
100s/50s	0/0
Top score	9
Balls bowled	0
Wickets	0
Bowling average	-
5 wickets in innings	0
10 wickets in match	0
Best bowling	-
Catches/stumpings	1/0
- Source: , 29 June 2016

Francis Adams (12 February 1835 – 10 February 1911) was an Australian cricketer, who played for New South Wales in First class cricket. His nephew, Frank Iredale, played Test cricket for Australia.

== Personal life ==
Adams was born in Ireland in 1835 and arrived in Australia with his family on the "Agnes" in February 1842. In his business life he worked for the AJS Bank. He was appointed manager in May 1884, a position he held until resigning in August 1907.
