= Nathaniel William Harrison =

English architect

Nathaniel William Harrison (5 May 1865 – 7 November 1944) was an English architect.

== Family ==
Nathaniel William Harrison was born at Holywell, Oxford on 5 May 1865, the son of Nathaniel Harrison junior of Oxford and Maria Frances Baxter of London. He had two sisters (Maria and Fanny) and two brothers (Hude and Gilbert). His family moved to 48 Rectory Road in St Clement's, Oxford in about 1870.

By 1906, he had moved to Highlands in Old Road, Headington (now numbered 57), where he was to spend the rest of his life.

On 21 August 1909 in Bearsdon, Glasgow he married Jeanie Watt Fulton and they had four children.

Harrison died at age 79 on 7 November 1955 at 57 Old Road, Headington, Oxford.

== Career ==
Harrison was still at school at the beginning of 1881, but later that year he was articled to the Oxford architects Wilkinson & Moore. He studied at the Ruskin School of Art in Oxford.

In 1892, Harrison was admitted as a Member of the Society of Architects. He started practising independently in Oxford in 1899, at first from his parents' home in Rectory Road. In 1903 he was appointed architect to St John's College, Oxford and served as the surveyor to the North Oxford building estate, laying out Bainton Road and designing many houses there.

In 1910, he took on Thomas Rayson as his pupil architect. Also from that year until about 1918 he was in partnership with his younger brother Gilbert Andrew Harrison, M.S.A. From 1926 until his death Harrison had an office at 5 Turl Street, Oxford.

== Works ==
- Cherwell Boat House, Oxford (1904)
- Extension to Headington Quarry Infants’ School (1905)
- Renovation of Wycliffe Hall, 52 Banbury Road, Oxford (1905)
- Improvements to house for Sir William Osler at 13 Norham Gardens, including an addition to the garden front and a new bay on the south-west side (1905 and 1907)
- Remodelling of St Giles’ Gate, 46 Banbury Road, Oxford (1907)
- School of Forestry, Parks Road, Oxford (1908)
- Alterations to the Old Bank, 92 High Street, Oxford, including an extension of the front and a new larger entrance (1908)
- Restoration of 9 St Giles', Oxford for St John's College (1909)
- New building consisting of showrooms and cellarage for Messrs Eagleston & Son in St Clement's near The Plain, Oxford (1909)
- New chapel at St Hugh's Hall, Norham Gardens, Oxford (1909)
- The Queen's College, Oxford: Reconstruction of upper portion of cupola in Portland stone (1909)
- The Queen's College, Oxford: Renovation of clock tower in Clipsham stone (1910)
- Extensive improvements and alterations to The Rookery, Headington, to adapt it as the residence of Mr John Massie (1910)
- Alteration of the interior of George Street Congregational Church, Oxford (1911)
- Nurses' home at the Warneford Hospital, Headington (1913–14)
- Gardener's Cottage for Mr Massie of the Rookery, Headington (1914)
- New building for Martyr Brothers hairdressers and William Baker china and furniture on corner of 1 & 3 Broad Street and 31 Cornmarket Street, Oxford in consultation with Mr Payne Wyatt of London (1914)
- Schools of Rural Economy, Parks Road, Oxford (1914)
- Restoration of the Oxford Institute at 29 & 30 St Aldate's Street, Oxford (1916)
- The clock in the front quadrangle (over the doorway to the north quadrangle) of St John's College, Oxford (1919)
- St Swithun's Church, Merton, Oxfordshire: Tower Repairs (1926–7)
- Restoration of west front of the Library of The Queen's College, Oxford (1927)
- Corpus Christi College barge, Oxford (now a private houseboat near Donnington Bridge) (1930)
- Restoration of the roof of Iffley Church (1932)
- Extension to Savile House, Mansfield Road, Oxford for New College (1935)
- Chancel of All Saints' Church, Headington (1937)
- New houses for St John's College on the North Oxford building estate: Nos. 1, 3, 9, 11, 15, 17, 25, 27, 29, 10, 16, 22, & 30 Charlbury Road (1905–1921); Nos. 14 & 12 Linton Road (1905 and 1910); No. 199 Woodstock Road (1909); Nos. 5, 7, 2, 4, 8, 10, 12, 14, & 16 Chadlington Road (1911–1917; No. 21 Northmoor Road (1915); and 11 Belbroughton Road (1932)
