= St Andrew's Church, Oxford =

Evangelical Church in Oxford, United Kingdom

St Andrew's Church
- Parish Church of St Andrew
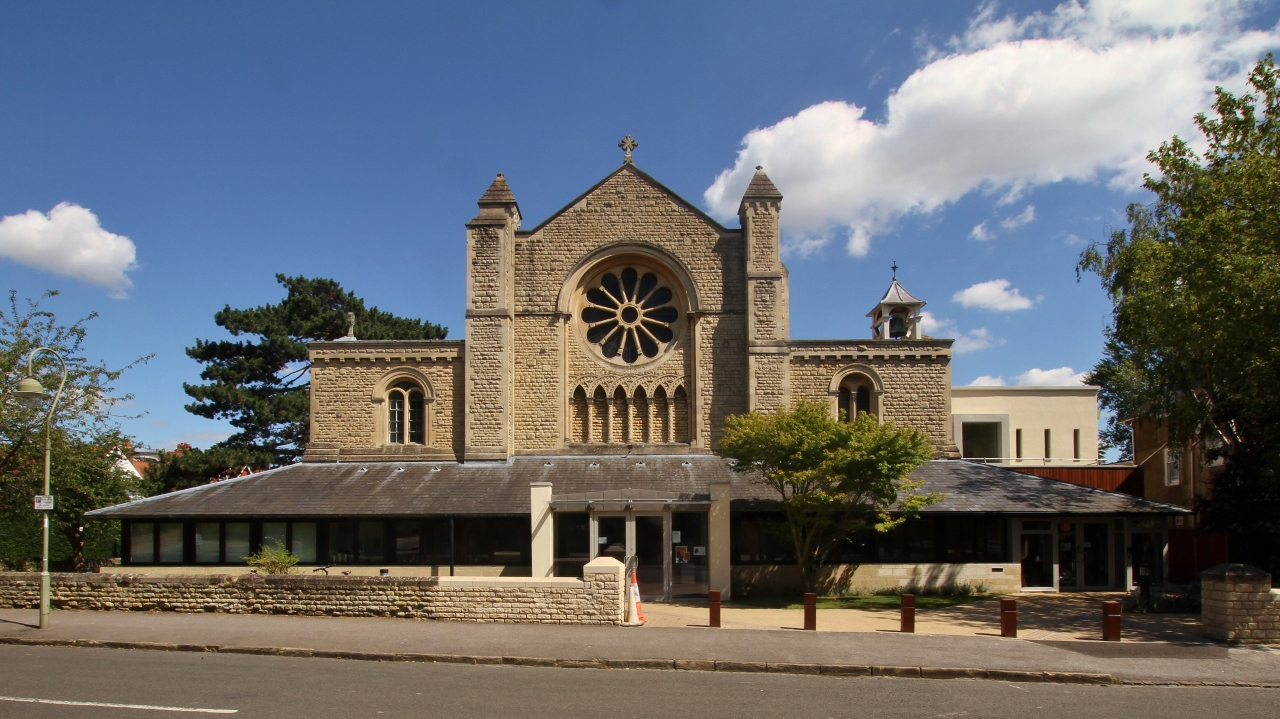
- St Andrew's Church
- 51.769836°N 1.259342°W
- OS grid reference: SP 51203 08165
- Location: Linton Road, Oxford
- Country: England
- Denomination: Church of England
- Churchmanship: Low church
- Website: St Andrew's Church North Oxford

History
- Dedication: Saint Andrew
- Consecrated: 1907

Architecture
- Architect: A. R. G. Fenning
- Style: Norman revival
- Years built: 1907

Administration
- Province: Canterbury
- Diocese: Oxford
- Archdeaconry: Oxford
- Deanery: Oxford

Clergy
- Vicar: Dan Heyward

St Andrew's Church, Oxford is an evangelical Church of England parish church in Oxford, England. It was consecrated in 1907 and is located on the southeast corner of Linton Road and Northmoor Road in the suburb of North Oxford.

== History ==
The church was established during the period of suburban expansion around Oxford which saw, among others, the residential neighbourhood of North Oxford being built. The vision of the founders of the church was to create an evangelical, Bible-believing church between Carfax and the northern ring road. Land for the parish was eventually carved out of part of the parishes of Ss Philip & James (on Woodstock Road, now the Oxford Centre for Mission Studies) and that of St Giles.

St Andrew's has now for over a hundred years served as the parish church to the eastern half of this area, from Banbury Road in the west to the River Cherwell in the east and from Park Town in the south to Marston Road in the north. Other members of the church congregation are drawn from a wider area; from other parts of Oxford and surrounding villages.

== Buildings ==
The building was designed by A.R.G. Fenning (1855–1937). It is in a neo-Norman style with four bays and two aisles alongside the large clerestoried nave. The chancel is a semi-circular apse with stained glass windows of biblical scenes. A west gallery augments the seating capacity, above which is the west rose window, a stylised version of which is used as the church logo. Some original plans for the building included a large campanile tower, but no money was available for it. There is a small bellcote on the south-west side.

In the 1980s, the expanding congregation meant that a larger building was deemed necessary, in order to accommodate all the activities that started up during this time. The result was the building of the wrap-around narthex at the west end of the building, designed by Robert Magure & Keith Murray Architects, containing increased office space, more toilet facilities and improved kitchen and meeting room facilities.

The size of the congregation at the start of the 21st century demanded extra space for church activities and meetings, with a range of possibilities considered – including digging a crypt basement beneath the nave, buying adjacent properties, and building on land to the south of the main building. The last of these was eventually chosen, with the new (temporary) rooms called "Southside". In late 2013, the PCC approved the removal of Southside in favour of a new, enlarged extension on the site. Building work commenced in 2014, with the funds necessary for the construction being raised solely through church members. The extension was designed by the architects MEB, and constructed by Beards.

== Services and ministry ==
On most Sundays there are four services, each with a different focus and format, ranging from formal to contemporary – these are at 08:00 (BCP two Sundays a month, Common Worship the rest of the month), 09:30 (family service, with groups for children and young people – all-age worship is held on the first Sunday), 11:15 (more formal Morning Worship, with robed clergy and a small choir) and 18:00 (more contemporary, lively service, with a worship band). As well as giving church members Bible teaching and Christian fellowship St Andrew's has ministries outside its walls, with outreach and charitable work locally in the parish and in estates elsewhere in Oxford as well as internationally, with support for missionaries around the World. The church also works closely with other churches, both in North Oxford and in the rest of the city, especially through the annual 'Love Oxford' event and the regular 'Vertigo' events, for young people county-wide.

On the first Sunday of the month, in conjunction with Causeway Prospects, St Andrews has a service for adults with learning disabilities, the JOY Place.

St Andrew's makes extensive use of modern technology and media services – two of the main services (at 9:30 am and at 6:00 pm) use projection software and have a worship band, full use is made of the church website, including using it for scheduling volunteers and sending out regular emails for prayer meetings.

At all main services, prayer ministry is offered at the end of the services (all services except the 8:00 am). The church also has an active pastoral care team, and offers activities for retired and senior members of the church, such as a monthly lunch club.

St Andrew's also runs regular Alpha courses, as well as after-Alpha courses and ministries to international students in the local area. St Andrew's is also active in schools work in partnership with other churches in the Oxford area – indeed, people from the church have been instrumental in founding an independent charity, the Oxford Schools Chaplaincy, to carry on this work.

At full complement there are usually three or four ordained clergy (the Vicar, a stipendiary curate (As of 2015 Rev. Simon Potter), a non-stipendiary curate (As of 2015 Rev. Jonathan Vaughan) and an Associate Vicar (Rev. Paul White)), who together with a large lay staff team and PCC lead, care for, and manage the church. Many clergy have gone on from St Andrew's to leading positions in the wider Church of England, including the present Bishop of Dorchester and Bishop of Kensington.

== See also ==
- List of churches in Oxford
- St Andrew's Church, Headington

== Sources ==
- Sherwood, Jennifer; Pevsner, Nikolaus (1974). The Buildings of England: Oxfordshire. Harmondsworth: Penguin. p. 289. ISBN 0-14-071045-0.
