= Garford Road =

Road in North Oxford, England

Coordinates: 51.7715°N 1.2577°W

Garford Road is a residential road in North Oxford, England.

The road is a cul-de-sac and leads east off Charlbury Road. To the south is Linton Road and Wolfson College, Oxford, which has residences on the road. The houses on the road were mostly leased from St John's College in 1928–30, largely designed by Christopher Wright, who also designed houses in Belbroughton Road to the north. One of the houses is known as Garford House.

== Residents ==
In 1928, 4 Garford Road was leased to Sir Carleton Allen (1887–1966), Civil Law Fellow at University College, Oxford and later Warden of Rhodes House.

The Galbraith family lived at 1 Garford Road from its initial lease in 1928. Prof. Vivian Hunter Galbraith (1889–1976) and his wife Ena Galbraith were both mediaevalists. Vivian Galbraith was made a Fellow of Balliol College in 1928 and became Regius Professor of History at Oxford University in 1948. They had three children, Jane, Jim, and Mary. Mary Galbraith, diplomat and writer, married the diplomat A. R. Moore and became the principal of St Hilda's College, Oxford, from 1980 to 1990.

In 1959, 1A Garford Road was leased to the physicist Prof. Brebis Bleaney CBE FRS (1915–2006), based at the Clarendon Laboratory of Oxford University. Later he lived at Garford House.

== See also ==
- Garford, a village south of Oxford and west of Abingdon
