= Chadlington Road =

Road in North Oxford, England

Coordinates: 51.7700°N 1.2563°W

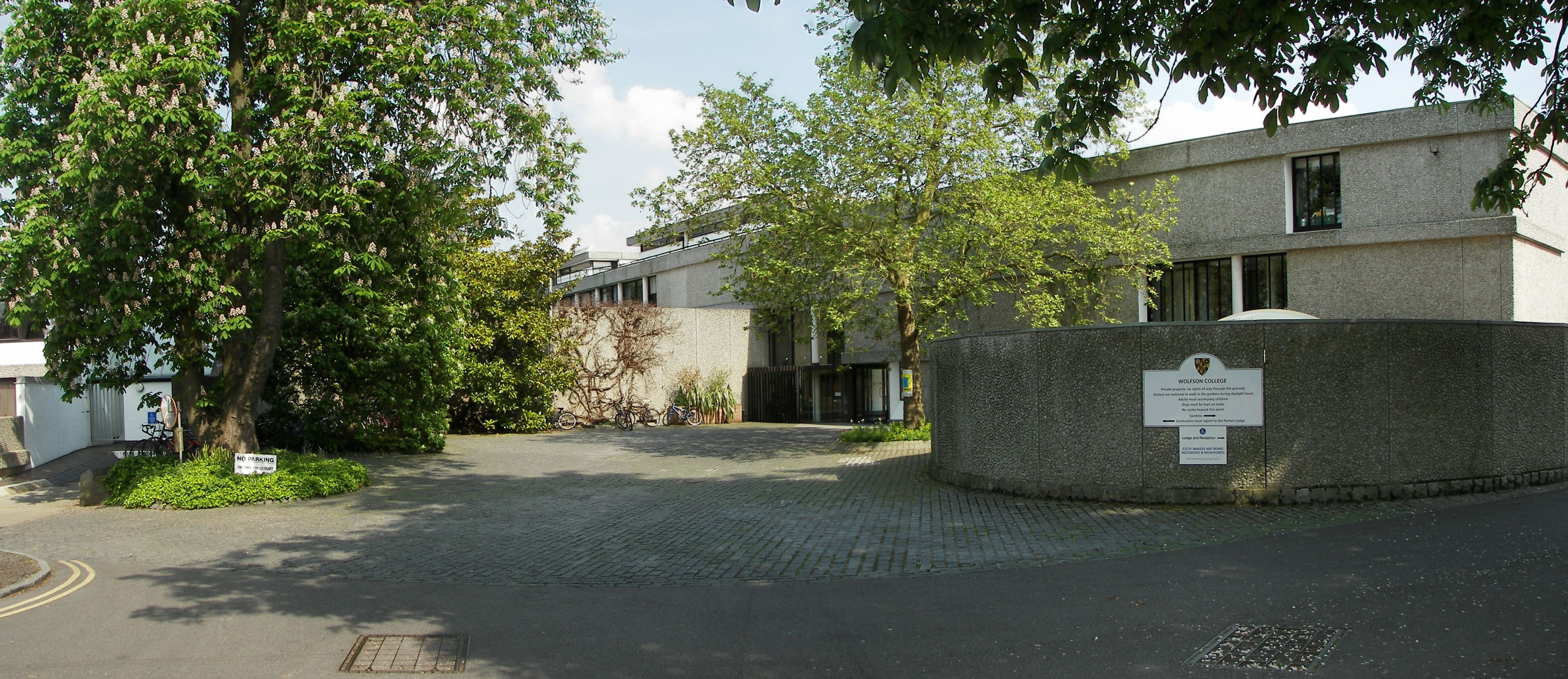
Forecourt of Wolfson College, close to the north end of Chadlington Road and its junction with Linton Road

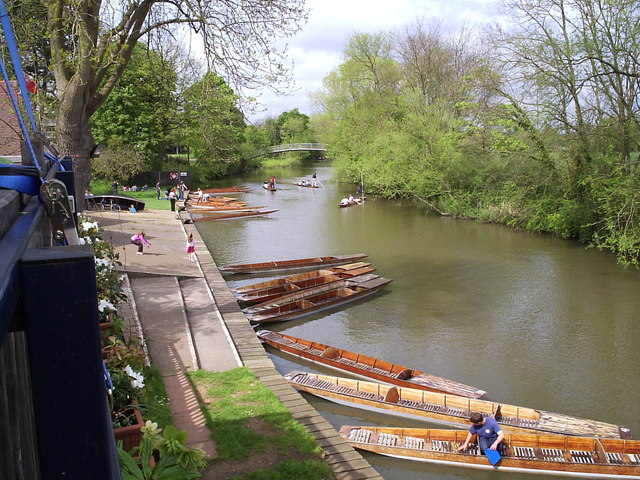
Punts on the River Cherwell at the Cherwell Boathouse, off the southern end of Chadlington Road

Chadlington Road is a road in North Oxford, England.

== Location ==
At the northern end is Linton Road, close to the front entrance of Wolfson College, a graduate college of the University of Oxford. Many of the houses on the east side adjoin and are used by the college. At the southern end, the road continues as Bardwell Road by the Dragon School. Here a small lane leads east down to the Cherwell Boathouse (formerly "Tims's") on the River Cherwell, where punts can be hired and a restaurant is now located. Parallel to the west is Charlbury Road.

== History ==
Houses in the road were first leased between 1910 and 1917. Most of the houses were designed by the architect N. W. Harrison. No. 11 was designed with half-timbering and stone-battered buttresses by Frank Mountain.

== Notable residents ==
William Henry Perkin, Jr. (1860–1929), an organic chemist at the University of Oxford and the son of the notable chemist W. H. Perkin, leased No. 3 Chadlington Road in 1917.

The historian and author Antonia Fraser (born 1932) lived at 8 Chadlington Road as a child when she attended the Dragon School, a short walking distance away.

J. H. R. ('Joc') Lynam, headmaster of the Dragon School from 1942–65, leased 6 Chadlington Road in 1958.

The Haldane family lived at 'Cherwell', a house located between Chadlington Road and the River Cherwell, in the early 20th century. The family included the physiologist and father, John Scott Haldane, together with his children, the geneticist and evolutionary biologist, J. B. S. Haldane (Fellow of New College, Oxford), and the novelist Naomi Mitchison. The house was built by George Gardiner and included a private laboratory. It was demolished to make way for Wolfson College, completed in 1974.

== See also ==
- Chadlington
