= Charlbury Road =

Road in North Oxford, England

Coordinates: 51.7710°N 1.2585°W

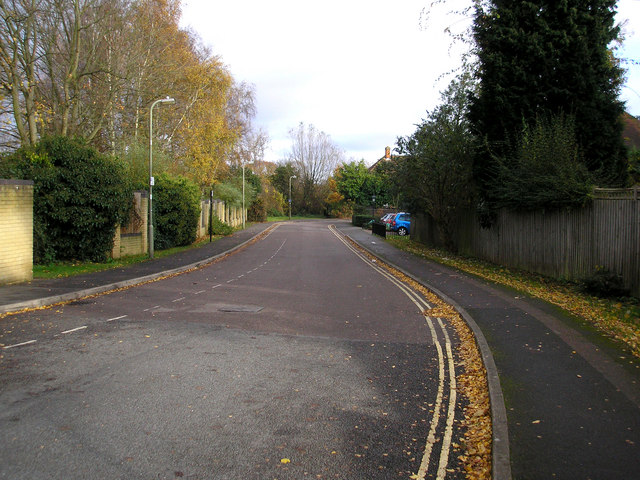
View of Charlbury Road.

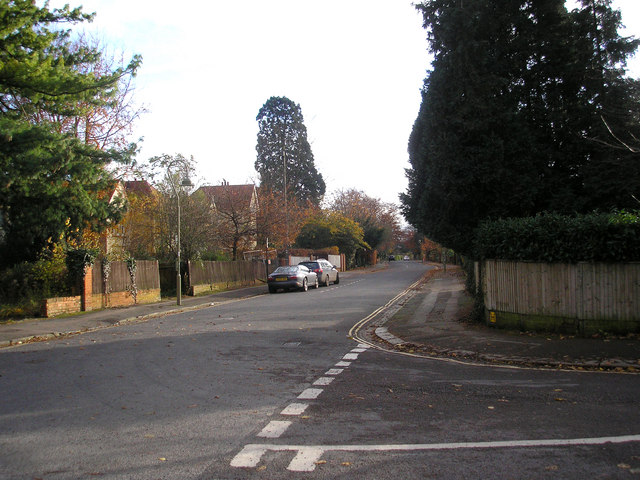
Looking south on Charlbury Road at the junction with Belbroughton Road on the right.

Charlbury Road is a road in North Oxford, England, running to the east of and parallel with the Banbury Road.

At the southern end of the road there is a junction with Bardwell Road, close to the Dragon School. 1, 3, 5 and 7 Charlbury Road is one of the Dragon School boarding houses. Linton Road crosses Charlbury Road about halfway up. Garford Road leads east off the road. At the northern end is a junction with Belbroughton Road to the west. The main entrance to the Oxford High School, an academically selective private school for girls, is located here. Charlbury Road takes a sharp right turn at this point and continues east to a new estate of houses. To the west running parallel with Charlbury Road is Northmoor Road.

== Notable residents ==
Two of the most famous former residents are the Oxford academic and author Iris Murdoch and her husband and fellow academic John Bayley. The couple moved from Hamilton Road, north of Summertown, to Charlbury Road in 1989. She wrote her later novels here, and she is commemorated by a blue plaque on the house. The area is featured in the 2001 film Iris, based on the book by John Bayley after Iris Murdoch's death from Alzheimer's disease. The road is favoured by senior academics.

The diplomat Sir Owen St Clair O'Malley KCMG (1887–1974) also lived in Charlbury Road.

== See also ==
- Charlbury, a village in west Oxfordshire
