= Summertown, Oxford =

Suburb of Oxford, England

Coordinates: 51.778°N 1.265°W

Summertown
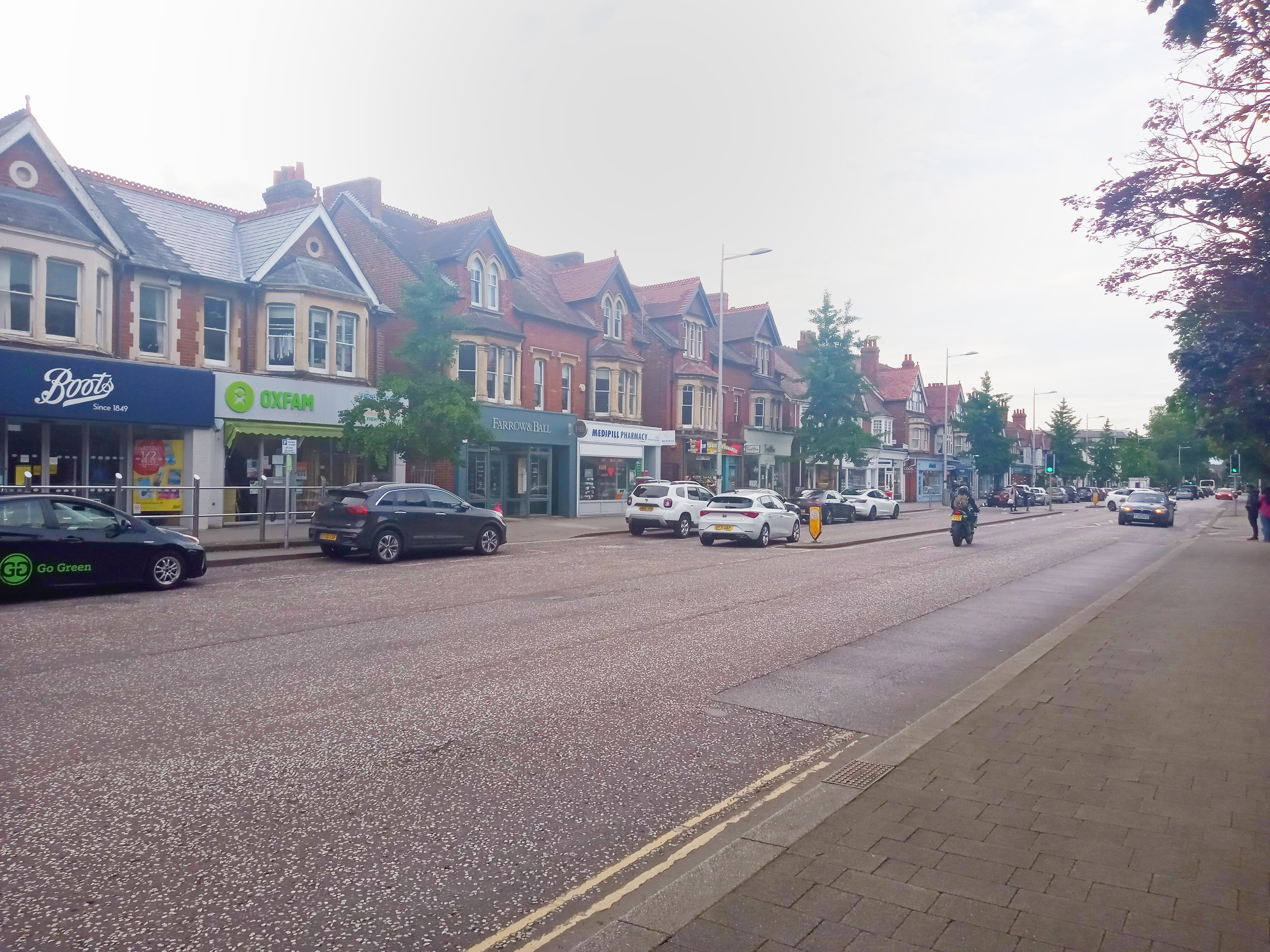
- Summertown Parade on Banbury Road

- Location within Oxfordshire
- OS grid reference: SP5008
- Civil parish: unparished
- District: Oxford
- Shire county: Oxfordshire
- Region: South East
- Country: England
- Sovereign state: United Kingdom
- Post town: Oxford
- Postcode district: OX2
- Dialling code: 01865
- Police: Thames Valley
- Fire: Oxfordshire
- Ambulance: South Central
- UK Parliament: Oxford West
- Website: Oxford City Council

Summertown in North Oxford is a suburb of Oxford, England. Summertown is a one-mile square residential area, north of St Giles, the boulevard leading out of Oxford's city centre. Summertown is home to several independent schools and the city's most expensive houses. On both sides of Banbury Road are Summertown's shops. A smaller street of shops and restaurants, South Parade, links Banbury Road and Woodstock Road. Summertown extends to Squitchey Land and Hernes Road in the north to Moreton Road and Marston Ferry Road in the south. The suburb is home to much of Oxford's broadcast media. BBC Radio Oxford and the BBC Television's Oxford studios are on Banbury Road. Start-ups also have an increasing presence on the parade, such as Brainomix and Passle. The studios for JACK FM, Glide FM, and Six TV Oxford (no longer broadcasting) are on Woodstock Road.

== History ==
Summertown was originally a small village north of Oxford. The parish was formed in 1833 by dividing the northern part of the large St Giles' parish off as a separate parish. Most of North Oxford came into being as a result of the decision by the university in 1877 to permit college fellows to marry and live in private houses, as opposed to rooms in college. Large houses were built on farmland either side of Banbury Road and Woodstock Road. Much of the land belonged to St John's College, Oxford and the houses were originally sold leasehold. The College has since sold the freehold on most of these properties. With the built-up area extending from central Oxford to Summerworn and beyond, Summertown is now a suburb of Oxford.

== Churches ==
=== Church of England ===
Summertown's Church of England parish church is Saint Michael and All Angels in Lonsdale Road. The parish originated as part of Saint Giles, Oxford, when the chapel of Saint John the Baptist was completed in Middle Way, Summertown in 1832. It was a chapel of ease until 1834, when it was made a separate ecclesiastical parish. The Gothic Revival architect H. J. Underwood designed St. John's in an Early English Gothic style. It was cruciform with a nave, north and south transepts and a short chancel. It had no tower, but there was a bell-turret on the western gable of the nave. The Oxford Diocesan architect, G.E. Street extended the chancel and added the vestry in 1857. In 1875, St John's was enlarged again with the addition of north and south aisles, an organ chamber and a second vestry, presumably for a choir.

The congregation outgrew St. John the Baptist, so a new church, Saint Michael and All Angels in Lonsdale Road, was built to replace it in 1908–09. St. John's was demolished in 1924, the site was sold in 1970, and a block of flats now stands on the site. St. Michael's is also a cruciform Early English Gothic Revival building, in this case designed by A.M. Mowbray. The building has never been completed. It has a chancel, north and south transepts, vestry, and a south chapel beside the chancel, but the nave and north and south aisles comprise only one bay ending in a "temporary" west wall that has stood for more than a century. The building is coursed rubblestone apart from the temporary west wall, which is brick.

=== Non-conformist ===
A nonconformist chapel in Middle Way was completed in 1824 but had closed by 1830. It has been a Spiritualist church since 1967. Summertown United Reformed Church began in 1838 as a Congregational mission to Summertown. A chapel for it in Middle Way was completed in 1844. The present Gothic Revival church on Banbury Road was built in 1894 and its transepts and meeting room were added in 1910. The former chapel in Middle Way was demolished in 1971. Both Saint Michael's and the URC church belong to the Summertown-Wolvercote Church Partnership which is a local ecumenical partnership. Woodstock Road Baptist Church, on the corner of Beechcroft Road, was opened in 1897 and rebuilt in 1955. It is a member of the Fellowship of Independent Evangelical Churches.

=== Roman Catholic ===
The Roman Catholic Parish church of Saints Gregory and Augustine on Woodstock Road, was founded in 1911, the same year as Saint Edmund and Frideswide (Iffley Road, now run by the Capuchin Franciscans). Previously the Oxford area had been served by the Jesuits at St Aloysius (now an Oratory of St Philip Neri), which was founded in 1875, replacing the church of St Ignatius (in St Clement's), which had been founded immediately after the relaxation of the penal laws forbidding the building of Catholic places of worship, in 1795. More Catholic parishes were established in the ensuing decades. The architect was Ernest Newton, and a member of the Arts and Crafts movement. The fabric of the church is very little changed from the time of its foundation. Nikolaus Pevsner described the church thus (1974): "By Ernest Newton. Small and stuccoed. A rectangle, white, with a cupola. W. window with a gently double-curved head. Plaster tunnel-vault inside with tie beams."

== Public transport ==
In 1898, the City of Oxford Tramways Company extended its Banbury Road horse tram route to a new terminus at Summertown. In 1913, the company replaced its horse trams with motor buses. Buses running between central Oxford and Summertown via Banbury Road include the Oxford Bus Company 2 and 2a Heyfordian Travel 25 and 25A and Stagecoach 7, 7A, 7B, 17 and S5. Banbury Road also has limited-stop Park and Ride bus services linking Water Eaton with central Oxford (route 500 run by the Oxford Bus Company) and with the John Radcliffe Hospital (route 700 run by Stagecoach). As of 2011, Oxford Bus Company and Stagecoach came to an agreement in which they would share the same bus timetable and accept the same ticket or bus pass. This eliminated the 7, 7A, and 7B buses.

== Educational facilities ==
The following schools and colleges are in Summertown:

- Cherwell School, the secondary school for the area, is on Marston Ferry Road to the east of Banbury Road.
- MECO Islamic School, a Saturday Islamic School for children aged 4–16, is on the site of Cherwell School.
- St. Clare's, Oxford, an independent, international residential college offering the International Baccalaureate Diploma, English-language courses and IB teacher workshops, is on Banbury Road.
- St Edward's School, an independent co-educational (13–18) boarding school, is located on Woodstock Road.
- The independent day and boarding Sixth Form of d'Overbroeck's College is on Banbury Road.
- Summer Fields School, an independent boys' (8-13) preparatory school, is on Mayfield Road.
- The Dragon School, an independent co-educational boarding and day school (4–13), is on Bardwell Road on the perimeter of Summertown. Lynams, the pre-prep school for the Dragon School, is located on Woodstock Road.
- Northern House School, for special education, is on South Parade.
- Oxford High School, an independent girls' (11–18) school, is on Belbroughton Road, east of Banbury Road. The two junior sections, Greycotes and The Squirrel, are respectively on Bardwell Road and Woodstock Road.
- Saint Philip and James Primary School, a Church of England Aided Primary School, is on Navigation Way.
- Ewert House in Ewert Place is part of the University of Oxford. It houses lecture and seminar rooms of the Department for Continuing Education and a large examination hall.
- Wolfson College is on Linton Road.
- Magna Carta College is on Mayfield Road.

== Notable residents ==
- Lord Berkeley, chairman of the Rail Freight Group.
- John Bayley, previously Warton Professor of English at Oxford, novelist and literary critic.
- Colin Dexter, author of the Inspector Morse novels.
- Margaret Gowing, academic, first Professor of the History of Science at the University of Oxford, Fellow of Linacre College.
- J.B.S. Haldane, British-born Indian geneticist and evolutionary biologist.
- John Scott Haldane, Companion of Honour, FRS, physiologist, Fellow of New College, famous for intrepid self-experimentation.
- Leszek Kołakowski, philosopher and publicist.
- Archibald MacLaren, gymnast, fencing master, and author.
- Naomi Mitchison, novelist and poet.
- Desmond Morris, zoologist, ethologist, and anthropologist.
- Dame Iris Murdoch, author and philosopher.
- James Murray, lexicographer and philologist.
- Yannis Philippakis of Foals.
- Sir Adam Roberts, academic, Emeritus Professor of International Relations at Oxford University, Emeritus Fellow of Balliol College and President of the British Academy.
- Sir Owen St. Clair O'Malley, diplomat.
- Sir Francis Simon, the leading physical chemist, physicist, and Fellow of Christ Church, Oxford.
- J.R.R Tolkien, philologist, author of The Hobbit and The Lord of the Rings, Rawlingson and Bosworth Professor of Anglo-Saxon at Oxford University and Fellow of Pembroke College.
- Tom Ward, actor who plays Harry in the BBC drama series Silent Witness.
- Sir Harold Warris Thompson, physical chemist.
- Athol Williams, award-winning poet and social philosopher.
- Katherine J. Willis, Baroness Willis of Summertown, a biologist and life peeress.
- Sir Martin Wood, co-founder of Oxford Instruments plc.
- Thom Yorke, member of the group Radiohead.

== See also ==
- Lonsdale Road

== Sources ==
- Eleanor Chance, Christina Colvin, Janet Cooper, C.J. Day, T.G. Hassall, Mary Jessup, Nesta Selwyn (1979). Crossley, Alan; Elrington, C.R. (eds.). Victoria County History: A History of the County of Oxford: Volume 4.
- Sherwood, Jennifer; Pevsner, Nikolaus (1974). The Buildings of England: Oxfordshire. Harmondsworth: Penguin. p. 332 et al. ISBN 0-14-071045-0.
