= Michael Brock =

British historian (1920–2014)

Michael Brock CBE FRSL FRHistS
- Born: Michael George Brock; 9 March 1920; Bromley, England
- Died: 30 April 2014 (aged 94); Oxford, England
- Occupations: Historian, academic administrator
- Years active: 1948–2000
- Spouse(s): Eleanor Morrison (married 28 July 1949)
- Awards: CBE (1981)

Academic background
- Education: Wellington College, Berkshire; Corpus Christi College, Oxford

Academic work
- Discipline: British history and culture
- Sub-discipline: British history
- Institutions: Corpus Christi College, Oxford; Wolfson College, Oxford; University of Exeter; Nuffield College, Oxford

Michael George Brock CBE FRSL FRHistS (9 March 1920 – 30 April 2014) was a British historian who was associated with several Oxford colleges during his academic career. He was Warden of Nuffield College, Oxford, from 1978 to 1988.

== Youth and education ==
Michael Brock was born in Bromley, Kent, England. His parents were Sir Laurence Brock, a civil servant for the British government, and Margery (née Hodder-Williams). He had an older brother, Patrick, and younger sister, Janet.

Brock was educated at a preparatory school and then, from 1934, Wellington College, Berkshire. In 1938, he joined Corpus Christi College, University of Oxford, to study Classics. In 1940 during World War II, he joined the Middlesex Regiment of the British Army. In 1943, he fell ill in North Africa and returned to Cheshire as an adjutant. He rejoined Corpus Christi College in September 1945, but decided to study modern history instead of Classics, gaining a first class degree in 1948.

== Career ==
Brock continued after 1948 at Corpus Christi College until 1966, serving as a junior research fellow, senior tutor, proctor, librarian, and dean. He then became Deputy President to Sir Isaiah Berlin at Wolfson College, a new graduate college at Oxford. He held a visiting professor position at the Hebrew University in Jerusalem, Israel.

Brock and his wife Eleanor moved to Bologna, Italy, to work collaboratively on editing letters written by H. H. Asquith, a former British Liberal Prime Minister, which were stored in Rome. The letters were written before and during the First World War to the socialite Venetia Stanley (1887–1948), the daughter of Lord Stanley.

On his to England, in 1977 Brock briefly joined the University of Exeter to oversee a merger with St Luke's College of Education. In 1978, he returned to Oxford to become Warden of Nuffield College, succeeding Sir Norman Chester.

Brock edited volumes 6 and 7 of The History of the University of Oxford, published by Oxford University Press. Until 2000, he sat on the Hebdomadal Council, the executive council of Oxford University. In 1988, Brock left Nuffield College to become Warden of St George's House at Windsor Castle for five years.

== Honours ==
In 1981, Brock was appointed a CBE. In 1983 he became a Fellow of the Royal Society of Literature. He was also a Fellow of the Royal Historical Society.

His former college, Corpus Christi College, established the Michael Brock Junior Research Fellowship in his honour.

== Selected books ==
- Brock, Michael (1973). The Great Reform Act. HarperCollins Publishers. ISBN 978-0091159115.
- Brock, Michael; Brock, Eleanor, eds. (1982). H. H. Asquith: Letters to Venetia Stanley. Oxford University Press. ISBN 978-0192122001.
- Brock, Michael G.; Curthoys, Mark C., eds. (1997). Nineteenth Century Oxford, Part 1. The History of the University of Oxford. Vol. VI. Clarendon Press. ISBN 978-0199510160.
- Brock, Michael G.; Curthoys, Mark C., eds. (2000). Nineteenth Century Oxford, Part 2. The History of the University of Oxford. Vol. VII. Clarendon Press. ISBN 978-0199510177.
- Brock, Michael; Brock, Eleanor, eds. (2014). Margot Asquith's Great War Diary 1914–1916: The View from Downing Street. Oxford University Press. ISBN 978-0198229773.

== Personal life ==
Michael Brock married Eleanor Morrison on 28 July 1949 in Dufftown, Scotland. They lived in Merton Street, central Oxford, and their first child, George, was born in 1951. The couple moved to Linton Road, North Oxford, in 1952. Their second child, David, was born in 1955, and their third child, Paul, was born in 1959.

In 2014, Michael Brock died in Oxford.

Academic offices
Preceded by Sir Norman Chester	Warden of Nuffield College, Oxford; 1978–1988	Succeeded by Sir David Cox
