= Bardwell Road =

Road in North Oxford, England

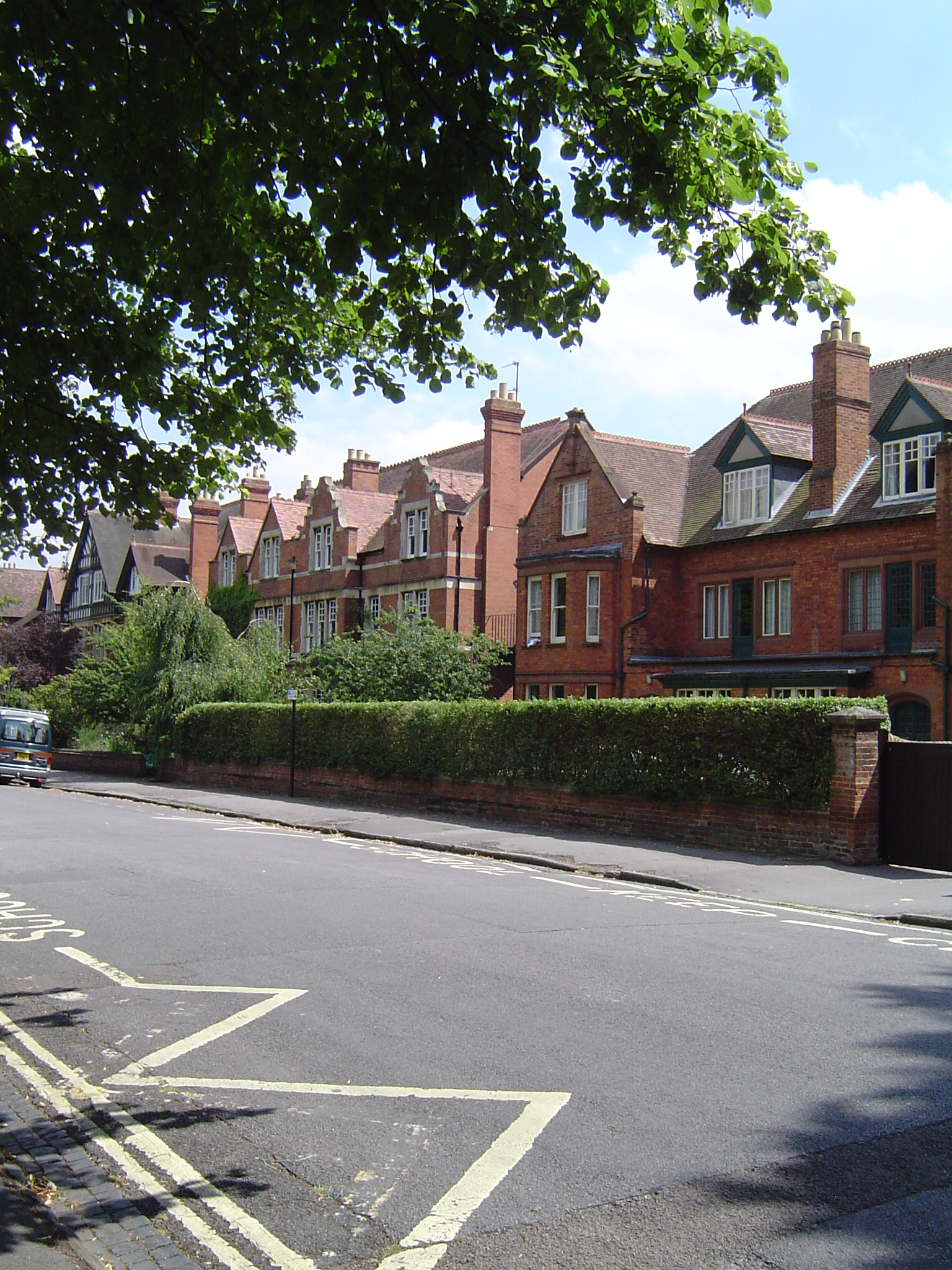
- The Banbury Road end of Bardwell Road
- Interactive map of Bardwell Road
- Former name: Greenditch
- Type: Street
- Owner: Formerly St John's College, Oxford
- Location: Oxford, England
- Quarter: North Oxford
- Postal code: OX2
- Coordinates: 51.7679°N 1.2583°W
- West end: Banbury Road
- East end: Chadlington Road
- North: Northmoor Road, Charlbury Road, Linton Road
- East: Chadlington Road, Dragon School
- South: Dragon Lane, Park Town
- West: Banbury Road (A4165), Wychwood School

Construction
- Construction start: 1890s

Other
- Known for: Schools

Bardwell Road is a residential road in Oxford, England. It is located in North Oxford off the Banbury Road, within the area of Oxford once owned by St John's College, Oxford. The road is known for its schools, especially the Dragon School.

== History ==
The road is named after Bardwell in Suffolk, a "living" of St John's College from 1635. It was originally approximately on the line of Greenditch, the former name of St Margaret's Road, where historically those who had committed capital crimes were executed.

Houses on Bardwell Road were largely built during the 1890s. Architects included Harry Wilkinson Moore, Herbert Quinton, and Messrs Radclyffe & Watson. The road lies on Oxford Clay at a depth of three feet, as discussed in Oxoniensia.

== Schools ==
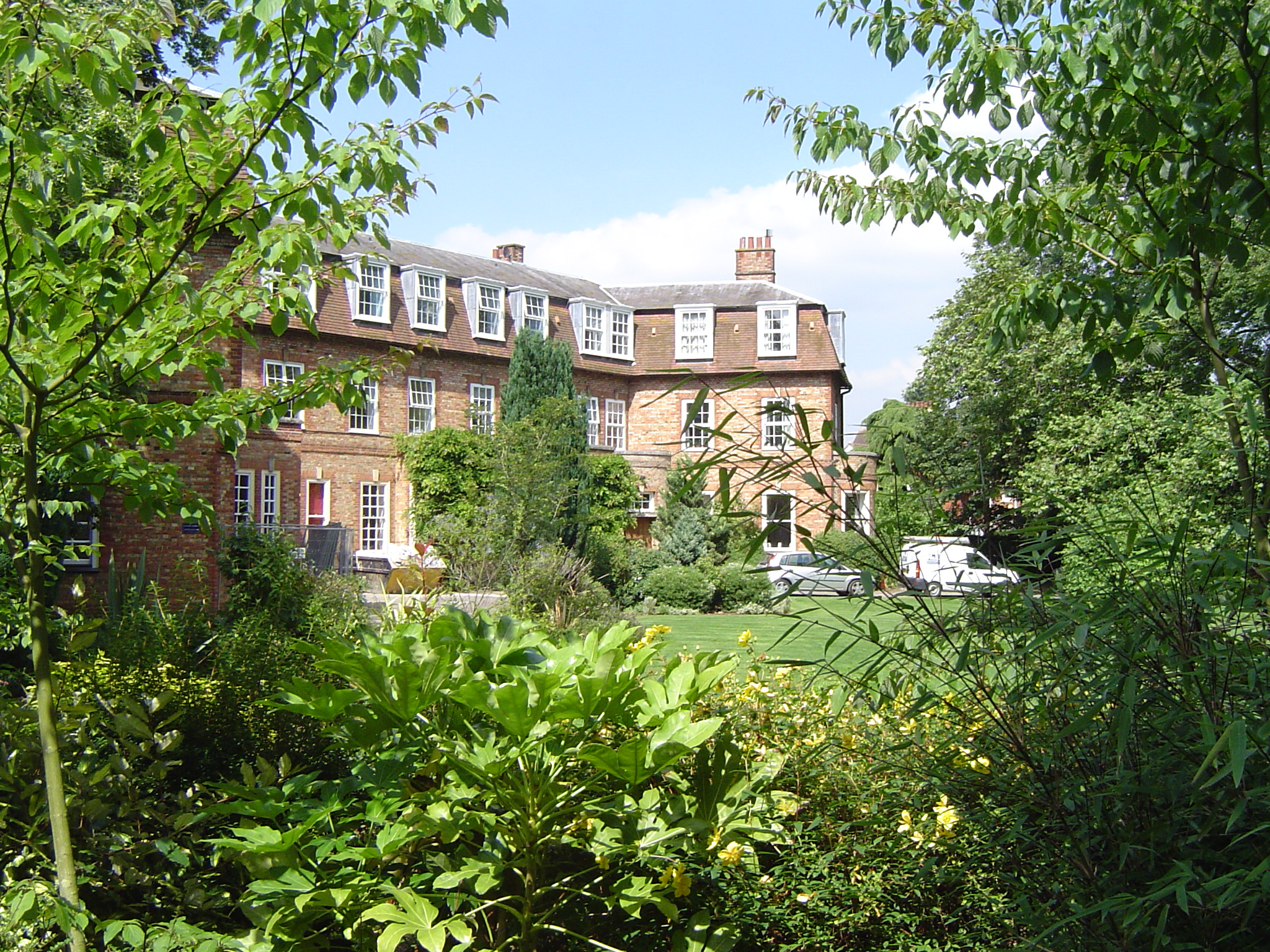
School House at the Dragon School, on Bardwell Road

Bardwell Road is the location of the Dragon School, a well-known preparatory school. The second headmaster, Charles Cotterill Lynam (known as the "Skipper"), took a building lease on land to the southeast of Bardwell Road in 1893. In 1894, Lynam's Oxford Preparatory School was established on this site. £4,000 was quickly raised through subscriptions from local parents for the erection of new school buildings. The school moved from its previous location at 17 Crick Road within a year. The choice of its new location proved to be a wise one, and the school has prospered as the Dragon School on this site to the present day.

The Bardwell Road Centre, one of the two locations of St Clare's College, is to be found here as well.

Wychwood School for girls is located on the southern corner of Bardwell Road and Banbury Road, at the western end. On the north side of the road is the Preparatory School for Oxford High School, formerly the site of Greycotes School. Peter Snow notes the cars delivering and collecting school children in Bardwell Road, part of what he terms "Dragonland".

== Location ==
Northmoor Road and Charlbury Road lead north off Bardwell Road, and Chadlington Road continues north at the far eastern end from the Banbury Road, all leading to Linton Road. To the south is Park Town, connected via Dragon Lane along the edge of the Dragon School site.

Off the road at the eastern end is the Cherwell Boathouse, down a lane at the junction with Chadlington Road next to the Dragon School playing fields, where punts can be rented for use on the River Cherwell.

== Residents ==
Henry Underhill (1855–1921), the antiquarian and artist, lived at 20 Bardwell Road. Reginald Philip Capel (1886–1961), Mayor of Oxford 1944–5, lived at St John's Cottage in Bardwell Road.
