= Roaf =

Roaf is a surname. Notable people with the name include:

- Andree Layton Roaf (1941–2009), member of Arkansas Supreme Court
- Michael Roaf (contemporary), British orientalist
- Susan Roaf (born 1958), British Professor of Architectural Engineering
- Willie Roaf (born 1970), American football player
