= Oxford Ecohouse =

Experimental green building, UK

Oxford Ecohouse is a house in Oxford designed to maximise energy efficiency. It is equipped with the first photovoltaic cell roof installed in Britain (in 1995). Situated in a suburban street in North Oxford, it was designed by Susan Roaf, a professor at Heriot-Watt University.

A six-bedroom family home, it produces only 130 kg CO_{2}/annum per metre square, in contrast to comparable UK houses that produce 5000 kg CO_{2}/annum m^{2}. It has 4 kW peak of photovoltaic output, 5m² of solar hot water panels and additional heating from a passive solar sun space. It was designed using low energy construction techniques, high thermal mass and a wood-burning stove to reduce carbon dioxide emissions by over 95%. The house has featured in a number of architecture books and is used as a research source in sustainable design.

== See also ==
- Energy efficiency in British housing
