= Brebis Bleaney =

British physicist (1915–2006)

Brebis Bleaney CBE FRS
- Born: 6 June 1915; 423 King's Road, Chelsea, London, England
- Died: 4 November 2006 (aged 91); Garford House, Garford Road, Oxford, England
- Education: Westminster City School; St John's College, University of Oxford (MA, DPhil)
- Known for: Electron paramagnetic resonance (EPR)
- Awards: Hughes Medal (1962); Holdwek Medal (1984)
- Scientific career
- Fields: Low-temperature physics
- Workplaces: Clarendon Laboratory, University of Oxford
- Thesis: Some properties of matter at very low temperatures (1939)
- Doctoral advisor: Francis Simon
- Doctoral students: Geoffrey Copland

Brebis Bleaney CBE FRS (6 June 1915 – 4 November 2006) was a British physicist. His main area of research was the use of microwave techniques to study the magnetic properties of solids. He was head of the Clarendon Laboratory at the University of Oxford from 1957 to 1977. In 1992, Bleaney received the International Zavoisky Award "for his contribution to the theory and practice of electron paramagnetic resonance of transition ions in crystals."

== Education ==
Brebis Bleaney was born at 423 King's Road, Chelsea, London, the second son of Frederick Bleaney, a house painter, and Eva Johanne Petersen, born in Denmark. He attended the Cook's Ground School, Chelsea from where he obtained a scholarship to Westminster City School. In 1933, he obtained an open scholarship in science to St John's College, Oxford, to read physics. He graduated with first-class honours in 1937. Bleaney went on to do research supervised by Francis Simon, obtaining a DPhil degree in 1939.

== Career and research ==
After his DPhil degree, Bleaney moved into the new Clarendon Laboratory but then came the war and, like so many other scientists, he was assigned to war-related work. In Bleaney's case, he was drafted into the Oxford-based Admiralty team which worked on the development of microwave techniques for radar. He made many contributions to this programme, particularly in the development of klystrons.

In 1943, the group was visited by Jerrold R. Zacharias from Massachusetts Institute of Technology (MIT) who saw that their K-band reflex klystron was much easier to manufacture and more reliable than the one developed by Bell Labs. A visit by Bleaney to Waltham, Massachusetts resulted in Raytheon manufacturing them on a large scale.

In 1945, Bleaney was appointed as a university lecturer in Oxford, and then a fellow of St John's College in 1947. His group's research into resonances in a wide range of paramagnetic substances at very low temperatures resulted in Oxford becoming "the major world centre for research in EPR".

== Awards and honours ==
In 1950, Bleaney was elected a Fellow of the Royal Society (FRS). In 1956, he was appointed Dr Lee's Professor of Experimental Philosophy at Oxford, succeeding Francis Simon who had died suddenly after only a short time in the post. This unfortunately involved a lot of administrative work, and Bleaney stood down as soon as he felt he had played his part. He was appointed Commander of the British Empire (CBE) in 1965 and became a corresponding member of the French Academy of Sciences in 1974. He won the Royal Society's Hughes Medal in 1962 and the European Holdwek Medal in 1984.

Bleaney was considered for the Nobel Prize for Physics regarding two separate achievements but never received the award. However, there is an annual Brebis Bleaney Memorial Lecture at the Department of Physics in Oxford, established in 2019 and endowed by his student Professor Michael Baker (1930–2017).

== Personal life ==
In 1949, Brebis Bleaney married Betty Isabelle Plumpton at St Nicolas Church, Guildford. Betty Plumpton had been his student; they published a book together: Electricity and Magnetism, in two volumes (Oxford: Clarendon Press, 1957). The couple had two children, Michael Bleaney, now a noted economist, and Carol Heather Bleaney, who was at SOAS University of London and has published widely on the Middle East.

Bleaney died on 4 November 2006 at his home, Garford House, Garford Road, Oxford, and was cremated at Oxford crematorium.
