= Rainbow Bridge, Oxford =

Bridge in Oxford, England

Coordinates: 51°45′47″N 1°15′01″W

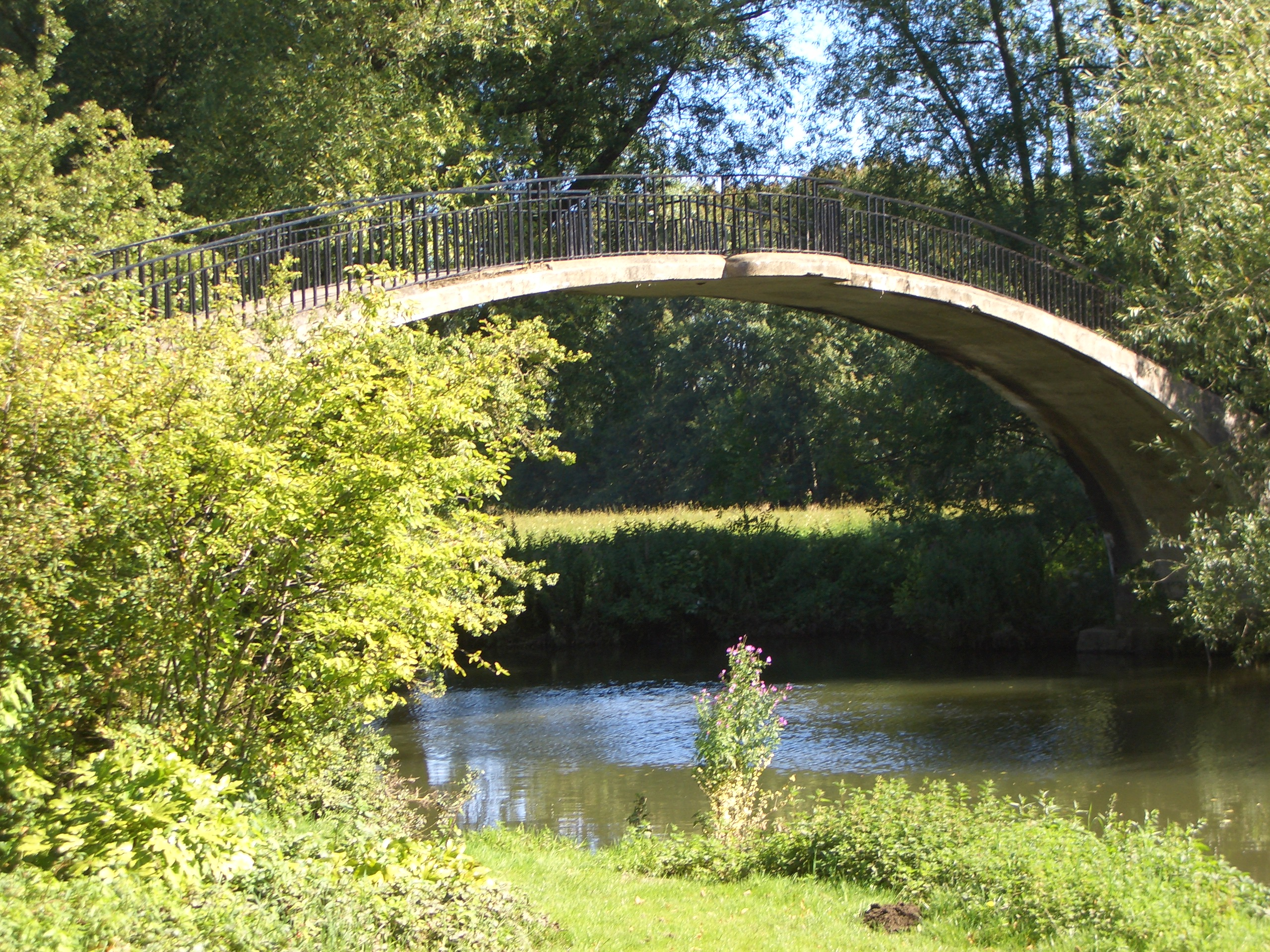
Rainbow Bridge.

Rainbow Bridge (formally High Bridge) is a curved footbridge over the River Cherwell in the University Parks, Oxford, England. The bridge is made of concrete with metal railings, in the shape of a rainbow, hence the name. The bridge was constructed in 1923–4, through a project for the unemployed. The bridge was financed by the University of Oxford, colleges at the university, and individual subscribers.

In the summer months, there are often punts travelling along the river under the bridge and there is a good view up and down the river from the top. On the other side of the bridge from the Parks there is a footpath that leads across the meadows to the suburb of New Marston GW.
