= Cherwell Boathouse =

Boathouse and restaurant on the River Cherwell in Oxford, England

Coordinates: 51.7697°N 1.2538°W

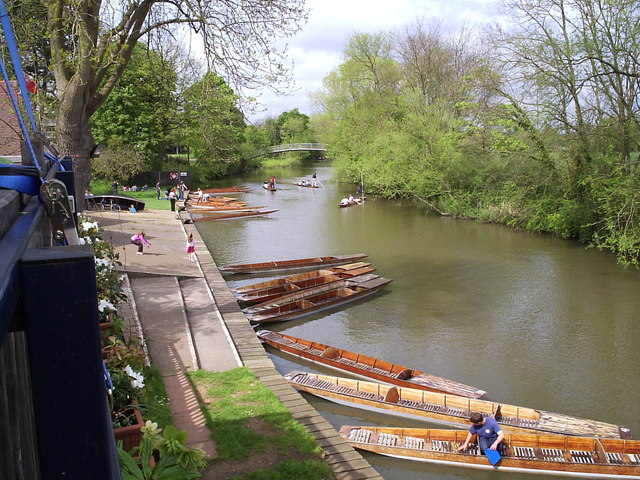
Punts on the River Cherwell at the Cherwell Boathouse.

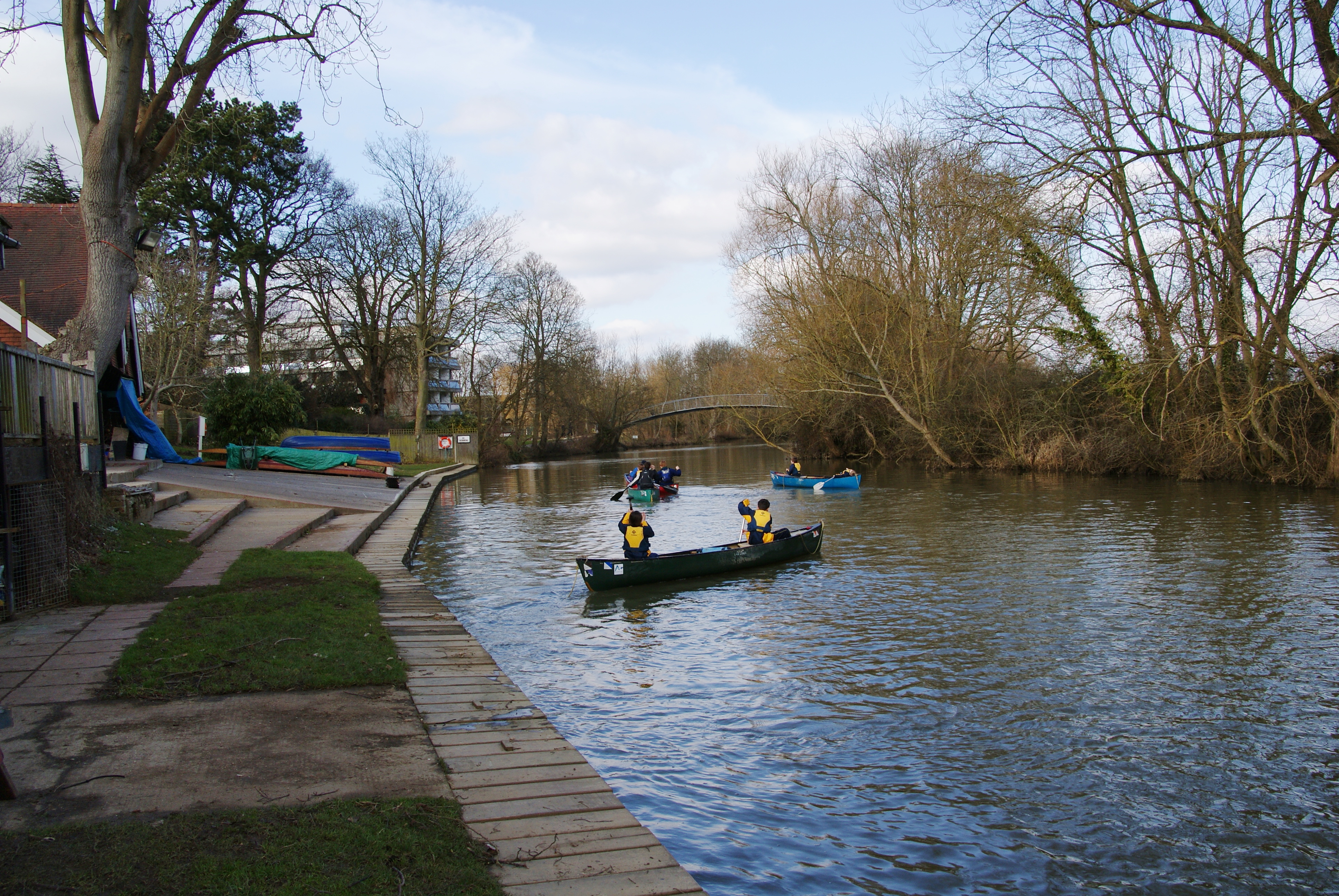
Punting at the Cherwell Boathouse.

The Cherwell Boathouse (also "Boat House") is a boathouse and restaurant on the River Cherwell in Oxford, England. It is located down a small lane off the junction between Chadlington Road and Bardwell Road, which itself is off the Banbury Road in North Oxford.

The land was leased by the Oxford University Boat Club waterman Tom Tims from St John's College, Oxford for a landing stage for punts in 1901. The boathouse was built in 1904 and was known as Tims's for the first forty years.

Punts and small rowing boats can be rented for use on the river. A restaurant and riverside café can be found on the same site. It is very popular with tourists and students in the summer. Upstream, punts can be taken to the Victoria Arms, Marston, a public house. Downstream, punts can be taken past the University Parks and Parson's Pleasure. Rollers must be used to take punts past the weir at that point to Mesopotamia.

Immediately to the north of the Cherwell Boathouse is Wolfson College and to the south is the Dragon School. On the opposite bank to the east are water-meadows.
