= Linton Road =

Road in North Oxford, England

Coordinates: 51.7702°N 1.2590°W

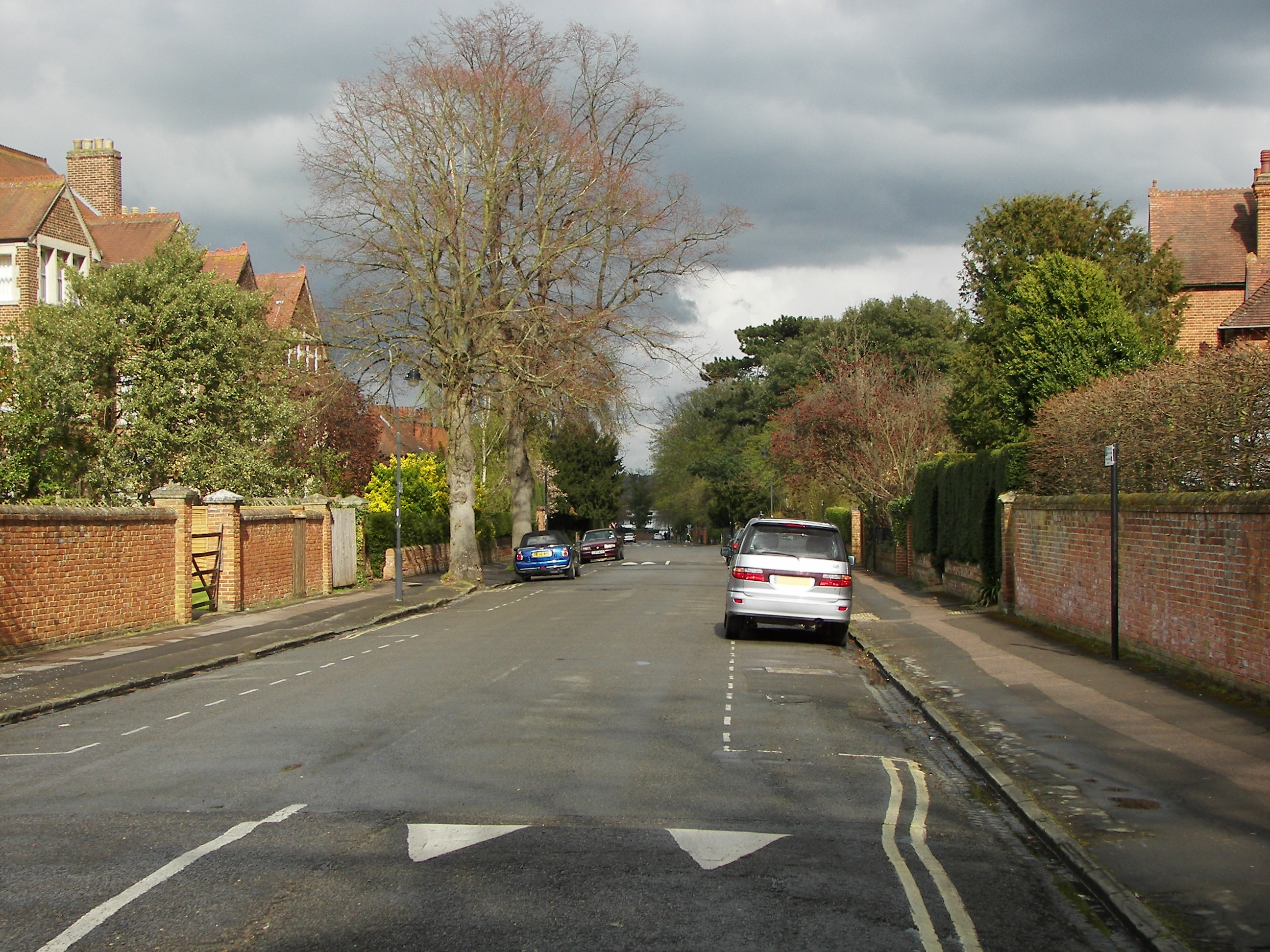
Linton Road as seen from Banbury Road.

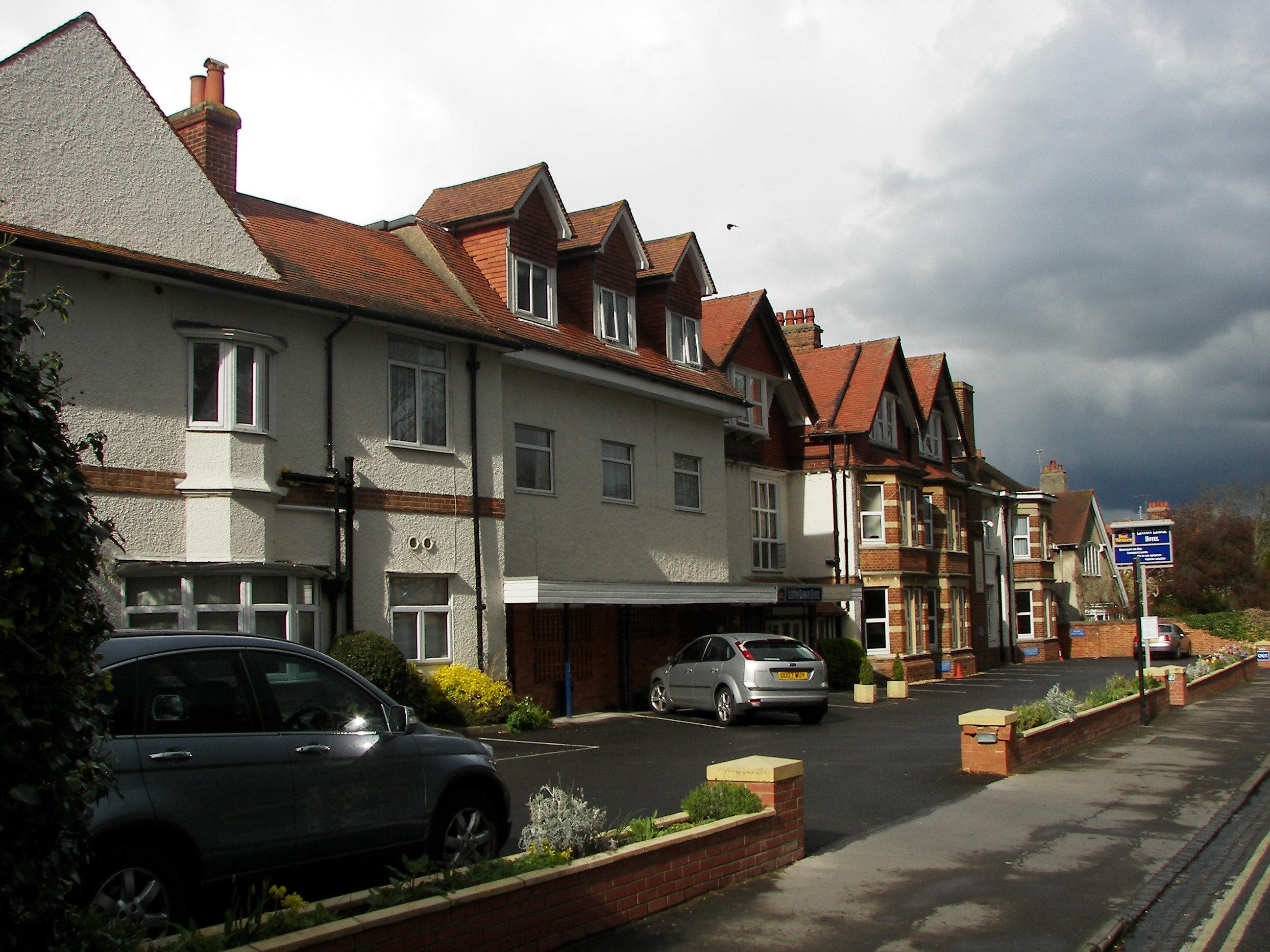
Linton Lodge hotel on the north side of Linton Road.

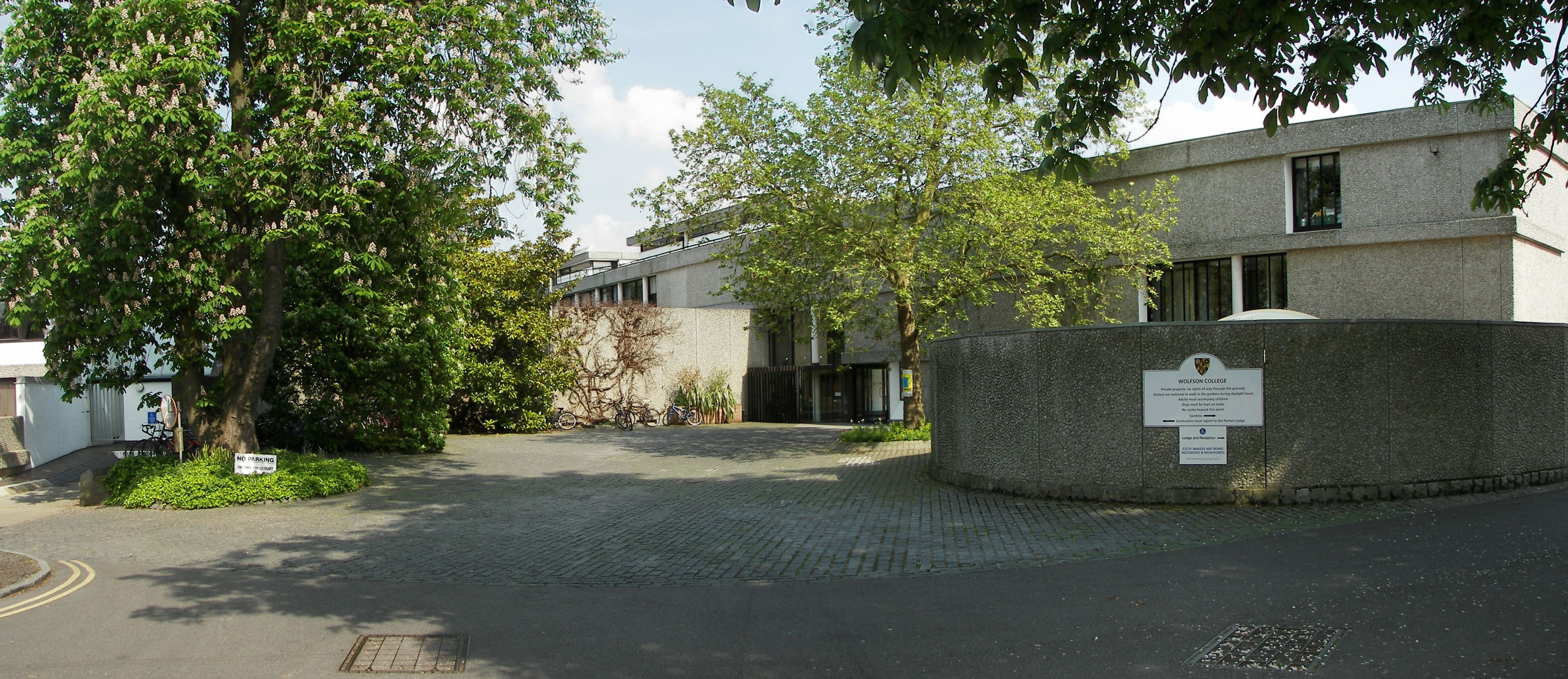
Forecourt of Wolfson College, at the end of Linton Road, close to the junction with Chadlington Road.

Linton Road is a road in North Oxford, England.

== Location ==
At the western end is the Banbury Road. At the eastern end is Wolfson College, a graduate college of the University of Oxford. To the north at the eastern end, Garford Road runs parallel with Linton Road. The road also adjoins Northmoor Road, Charlbury Road and Chadlington Road.

Linton Lodge Hotel is located in this road, as well as the Parklands Hotel on the corner of Banbury Road and Linton Road. The Bishop of Oxford also had a house here, near the western end, until its owners, Wolfson, reclaimed it in late 2014. St Andrew's Church is on the southeast corner of the junction with Northmoor Road. The road has speed humps to prevent traffic from moving too quickly.

== History ==
Houses in the road were first leased between 1895 and 1925. Architects include J. C. Gray, N. W. Harrison, E. J. Marriott, Arthur C. Martin, A. H. Moberly (who also worked with William Crabtree on the Peter Jones department store in London), and Harry Wilkinson Moore. Of special architectural interest, as noted by Pevsner, is No. 7 Linton Road, on the northwest corner of the junction with Northmoor Road, designed by A. H. Moberly in 1903.

On 4 May 1941, during World War II, an Armstrong Whitworth Whitley bomber of the Royal Air Force, based at RAF Abingdon, crashed at the eastern end of Linton Road on the site of what is now Wolfson College. The crew and one civilian were killed, and two further people on the ground were injured.

== Residents ==
The Haldane family lived at 'Cherwell', a house located at the eastern end of Linton Road, in the early 20th century, having previously lived at 11 Crick Road. The family included the physiologist and father, John Scott Haldane, together with his children, the geneticist and evolutionary biologist, J. B. S. Haldane (Fellow of New College, Oxford), and the novelist Naomi Mitchison. The house was built by George Gardiner and included a private laboratory. It was demolished to make way for Wolfson College, located next to the River Cherwell. The College was designed by the Powell and Moya Architects, and completed in 1974.

Other former residents include the physical chemist Sir Harold Warris Thompson (1908–1983), at No. 33, and historian Michael Brock (1920–2014) with his wife (and co-editor) Eleanor.

== Gallery ==
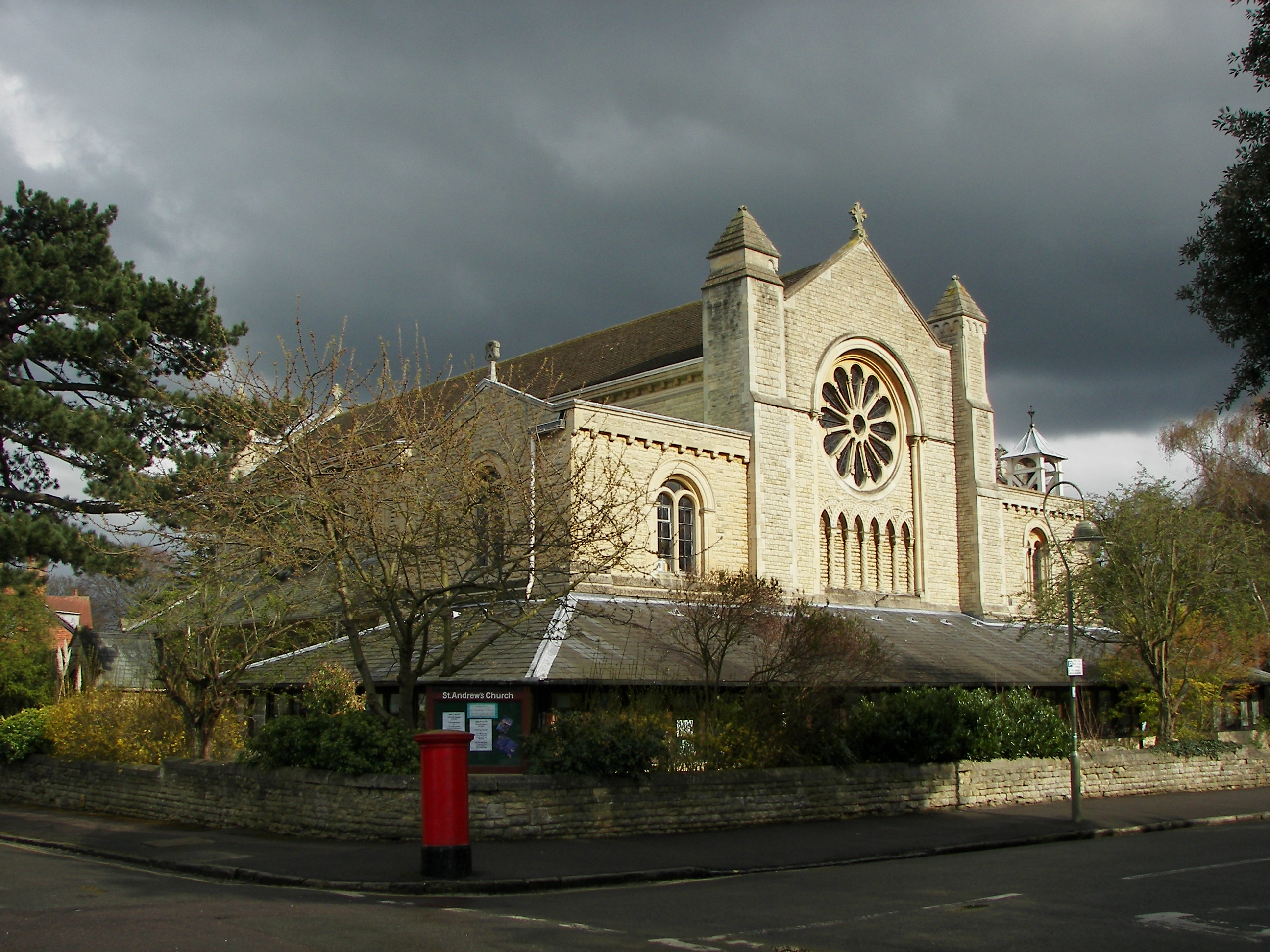
St Andrew's Church, on the corner of Linton Road and Northmoor Road.

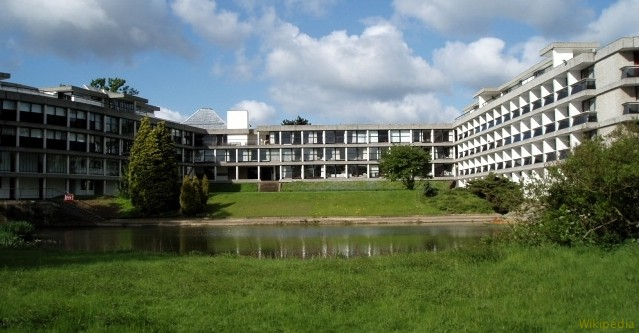
Wolfson College, at the eastern end of Linton Road.
