= Northmoor Road =

Road in North Oxford, England

Coordinates: 51.76912°N 1.25969°W

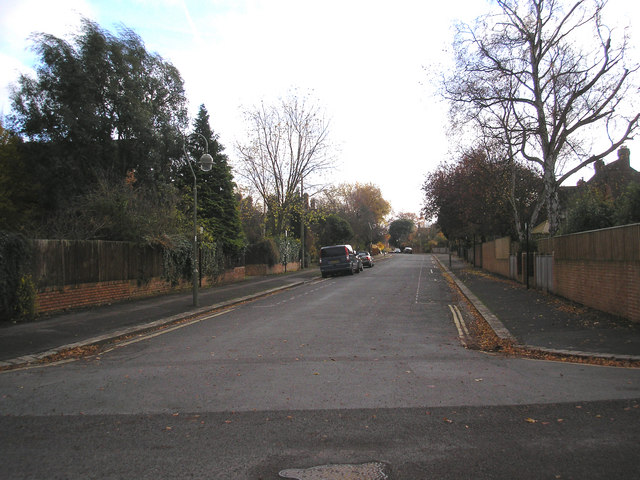
Northmoor Road, looking south from the junction with Belbroughton Road

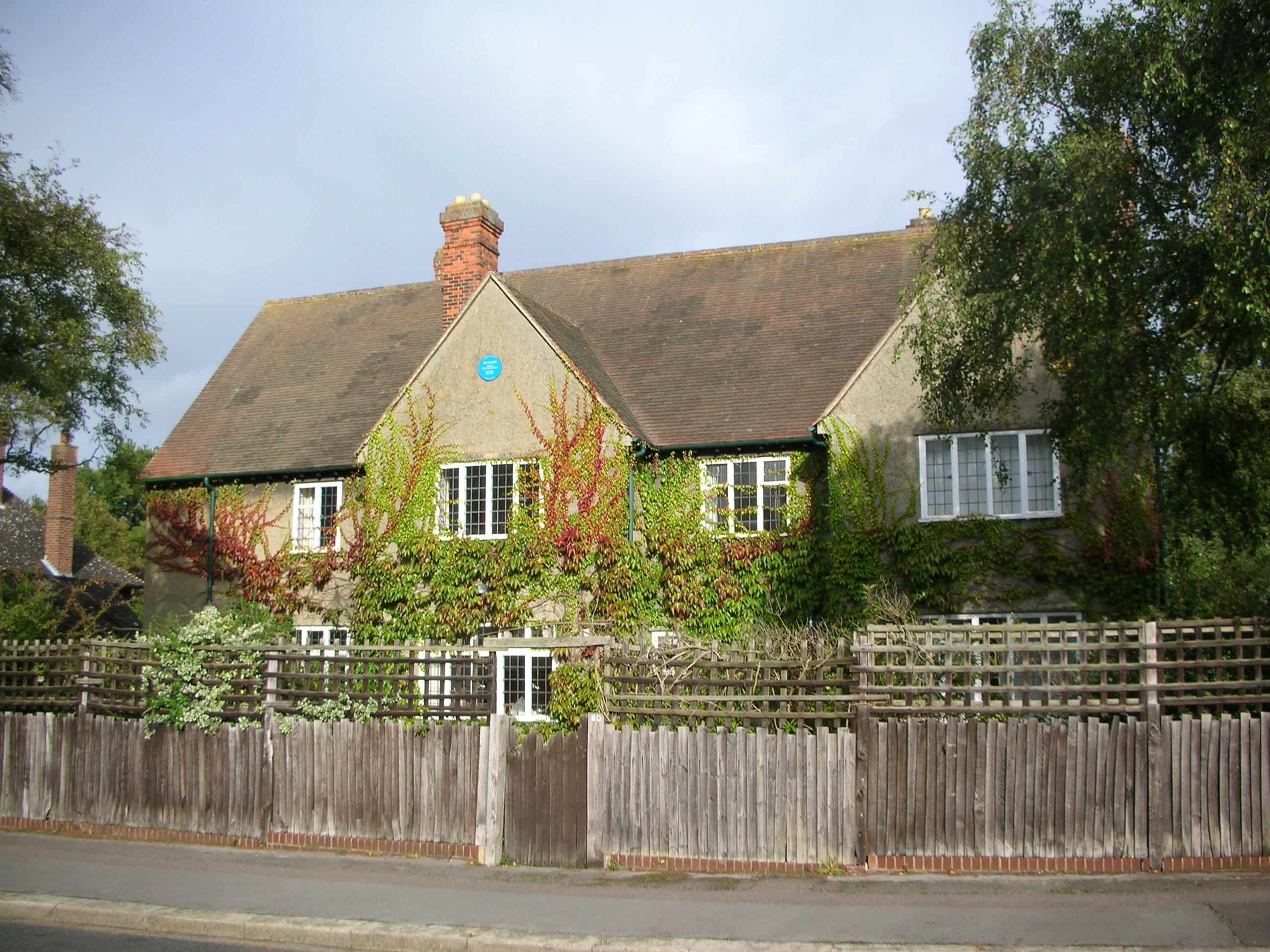
20 Northmoor Road, the former home of the author J.R.R. Tolkien

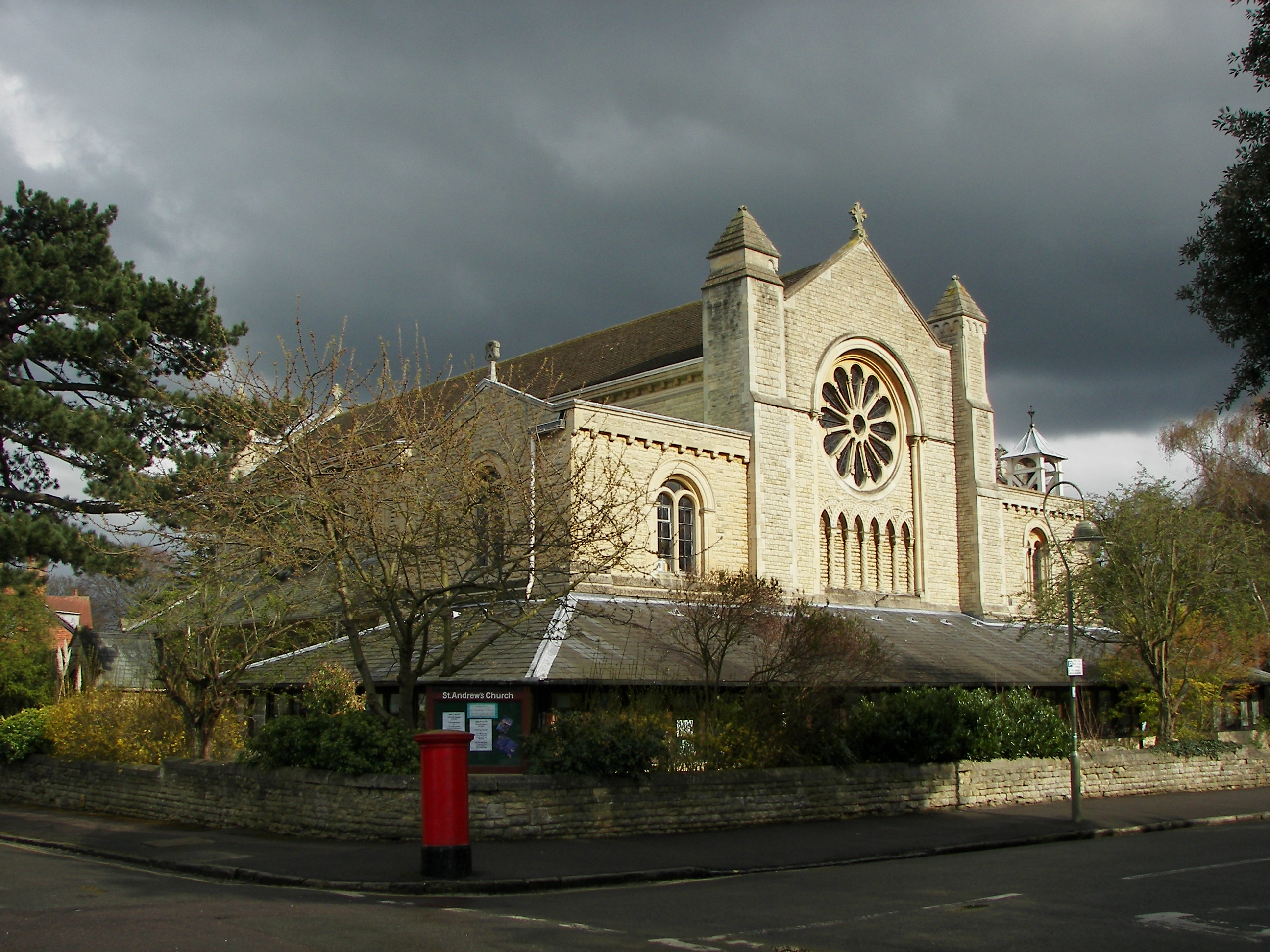
St Andrew's Church, on the corner of Northmoor Road and Linton Road

Northmoor Road is a residential street in North Oxford, England.

== Location ==
Northmoor Road runs north-south, parallel to and east of the Banbury Road. At the northern end is a junction with Belbroughton Road and to the south is a junction with Bardwell Road, location of the Dragon School. Linton Road crosses the road east-west about halfway along.

St Andrew's Church, established in 1907, is on the southeast corner of the junction with Linton Road. Just to the north is Northmoor Place, a row of newer terrace houses. Most of the houses in Northmoor Road are substantial detached residences, built between 1899 and 1930. Many of the earliest houses at the southern end were designed by Harry Wilkinson Moore (1850–1915).

== Residents ==
Perhaps the most famous resident of Northmoor Road was the Oxford academic and author J. R. R. Tolkien. He lived at No. 22 in 1926–30 and then a larger house at No. 20 in 1930–47. Tolkien wrote The Hobbit and most of The Lord of the Rings while living at No. 20. There is now a blue plaque on the house and it has been Grade II listed (Entry Number: 1391361) since 2004. Tolkien later lived at Sandfield Road in Headington. According to a 2019 report, much of No. 20's interior remains "largely unaltered" since the 1940s.

Another resident was Sir Martin Wood, who in 1959 set up his company, Oxford Instruments, in his garden shed at his house in Northmoor Road. Oxford Instruments, the first significant spin-out company from the University of Oxford, made the first superconducting magnets for MRI scanners and became a leader in medical technology. Later, in the 1980s, Wood founded the Northmoor Trust, aimed at promoting nature conservation at Little Wittenham and Wittenham Clumps in the Oxfordshire countryside south of Oxford. From 1994 to 2014, Michael O'Regan, OBE, and his wife Jane, lived at No. 6 Northmoor Road. O’Regan was co-founder of Research Machines, a company that supplies computer hardware and software for the educational market. In 1998, O'Regan founded the Hamilton Trust, a charity that provides resources for teachers.

The German Indologist and philologist Rudolf Hoernlé lived for several years at No. 8 Northmoor Road, dying there (during the Spanish flu pandemic) in 1918. Charles Firth (1857–1936), Professor of History at the University of Oxford, lived at No. 2, a distinctive house with a two-storey bow-front, designed by E. W. Allfrey in 1903–8. The house is in the Queen Anne style. The Oxford University historian of science, Professor Margaret Gowing, CBE (1921–1998), lived in Northmoor Place towards the end of her life. Michael Maclagan, Fellow and Tutor in Modern History at Trinity College, herald, and Lord Mayor of Oxford 1970–71, lived for many years at No. 20, Tolkien's former home. The diplomat Sir Julian Bullard (1928–2006) lived in Northmoor Road during his retirement.

Three Nobel Prizewinners are associated with Northmoor Road. The eminent Austrian quantum physicist Erwin Schrödinger and his wife Anny lived there from 1933 to 1936. Schrödinger previously held a Professorship at the Friedrich Wilhelm University in Berlin. He was not Jewish but was alarmed by the rise of anti-Semitism and accepted the offer of a Fellowship at Magdalen College Oxford to escape from Nazi Germany. Initially, they stayed at No. 12 Northmoor Road, and it was there that Schrödinger learned that he had been awarded the Nobel Prize in Physics, jointly with Paul Dirac from Cambridge. Early in 1934 the Schrödingers moved into No. 24, two doors from the Tolkiens, where they lived until Schrödinger left in 1936 to take up a Professorship at the University of Graz, Austria.

In 1935, while he was living at No 24, Schrödinger wrote his famous "Schrödinger's cat" paper, criticising the Copenhagen interpretation of quantum mechanics, which proposed that the exact state of a single atom was indeterminate until observed. Schrödinger's thought experiment imagined a cat in a steel box, together with a small sample of some radioactive material in which there was a 50% chance that, in any hour, one atom would decay and emit radioactivity. Any release of radioactivity, detected by a Geiger counter, would trigger a device that would cause a hammer to shatter a glass vial containing prussic acid, hence killing the cat. Schrödinger argued that, according to the Copenhagen Interpretation, the cat would be both alive and dead until someone opened the box after an hour to take a look.

Schrödinger's popular science book What is Life? influenced Francis Crick and James Watson, winners of the Nobel Prize for discovery of the structure of DNA, both of whom are also linked with Northmoor Road. Watson and his wife Liz owned an apartment at No. 19 for some time after he held the Newton-Abraham Visiting Professorship at Lincoln College, Oxford, in 1994.

== See also ==
- Southmoor Road
