= Susan Roaf =

Cllr Susan Roaf

Oxford City Councillor
- In office 2001–2008

Personal details
- Born: 28 October 1952 (age 73) Malaysia
- Occupation: Architect
- Known for: her work on "adapting buildings and cities for climate change"

Susan Roaf (born 28 October 1952) is a British architect, scholar and Professor of Architectural Engineering at Heriot-Watt University in Edinburgh since 2005. She is best known for her work on "adapting buildings and cities for climate change."

== Biography ==
Born in Malaysia, Roaf obtained her first degree in architecture in 1975 at the Manchester University, followed by her diploma in architecture at the Architectural Association in London in 1978. In 1989 she obtained her PhD at Oxford Brookes University with a thesis on the Windcatchers of Yazd in Iran. After graduating Roaf lectured in Technology and Design at Oxford Brookes but moved to the Heriot-Watt University in Edinburgh in 2005 where she was appointed Professor of Architectural Engineering. She is also visiting professor at the Open University and Arizona State University.

She has practiced for a number of years on the design of housing, schools, hospitals and town planning.

In 1995, Roaf built the Oxford Ecohouse, a house in Oxford designed to maximise energy efficiency. It is equipped with the first photovoltaic cell roof installed in Britain. A six-bedroom family home, it produces only 130 kg CO_{2}/annum per metre square, in contrast to comparable UK houses that produce 5000 kg CO_{2}/annum m^{2}. It has 4 kW peak of photovoltaic output, 5 m^{2} of solar hot water panels and additional heating from a passive solar sun space. It was designed using low-energy construction techniques, high thermal mass and a wood-burning stove to reduce carbon dioxide emissions by over 95%. The house has featured in a number of architecture books and is used as a research source in sustainable design.

Roaf served in Oxford City Council from 2001 until 2008, serving for the Liberal Democrats.

== Selected publications ==
- Beamon, Sylvia P., and Susan Roaf. The ice-houses of Britain. Routledge, 1990.
- Susan Roaf and Mary Hancock (eds.) Energy Efficient Building: A Design Guide, Halsted Press (1992) ISBN 0-470-21952-1
- Susan Roaf. Ecohouse 2, Architectural Press 2nd Edition (31 Jul 2003) ISBN 0-7506-5734-0
- Roaf, Susan, David Crichton, and Fergus Nicol. Adapting buildings and cities for climate change: a 21st century survival guide. Routledge, 2009.

Articles, a selection:

- Nicol, Fergus, and Susan Roaf. "Pioneering new indoor temperature standards: the Pakistan project." Energy and Buildings 23.3 (1996): 169–174.
