= Belbroughton Road =

Road in North Oxford, England

Coordinates: 51.7723°N 1.2603°W

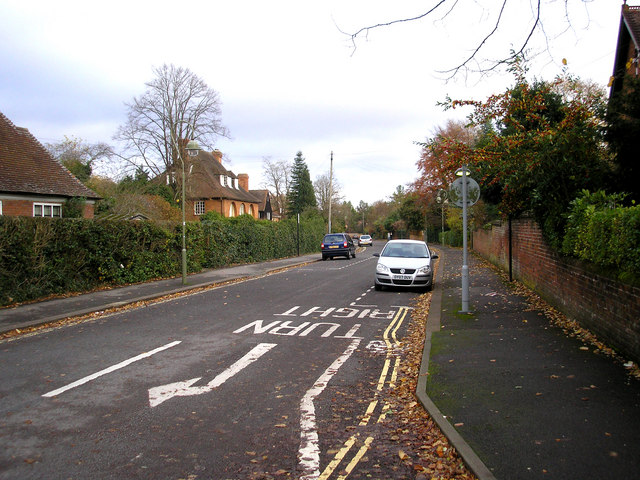
Looking east along Belbroughton Road from its junction with Banbury Road.

Belbroughton Road is a residential road in the suburb of North Oxford, England. The road runs east from Banbury Road. At the other end is Oxford High School, a girls' school. South from the road about halfway along is Northmoor Road, where J. R. R. Tolkien lived for a while in the 1930s. At the eastern end is Charlbury Road.

The road includes some large notable detached houses. Amongst them are houses designed by Christopher Wright in the neo-Georgian style. For example, No. 1 Belbroughton Road (built in 1926) is essentially a simple rectangular design, but including three very distinctive red-brick arches as a feature on the front facade, with rendering within each of the arches.

== Notable residents ==
Sir Francis Simon (1893–1956), the leading physical chemist, physicist, and Fellow of Christ Church, Oxford, lived at 10 Belbroughton Road. This is now commemorated with a blue plaque on the house, installed by the Oxfordshire Blue Plaques Board. The plaque was unveiled on 10 December 2003 by Sir Martin Wood, who previously lived in Northmoor Road, adjoining Belbroughton Road. No. 10 was the home of the Simon family from 1933 until the death of Lady Simon in 1999. They received many refugees at the house and provided hospitality for scientists, former students, and others from around the world.

== Poetry ==
The road was mentioned in the first line of a poem (May-Day Song for North Oxford) by the poet laureate Sir John Betjeman:

Belbroughton Road is bonny, and pinkly bursts the spray
Of prunus and forsythia across the public way,
…
