= River Cherwell =

Tributary of the River Thames in central England

Cherwell
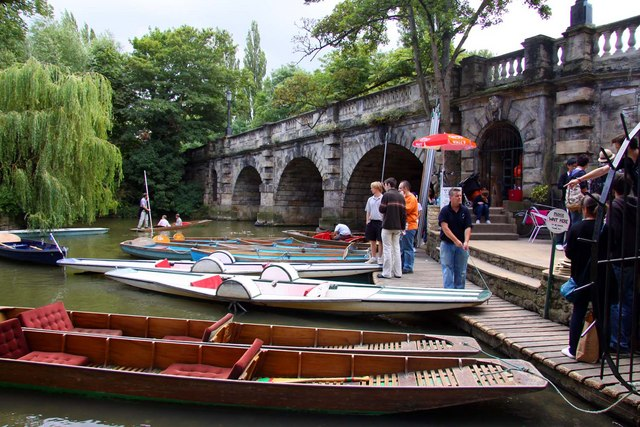
- The Cherwell at Magdalen Bridge, Oxford

Location
- Country: England
- Counties: Northamptonshire, Oxfordshire
- Towns: Banbury

Physical characteristics
- Source
  - location: Hellidon, Daventry, Northamptonshire
  - coordinates: 52°12′23″N 1°14′49″W
  - elevation: 179 m (587 ft)
- Mouth: River Thames
  - location: Oxford, Oxfordshire
  - coordinates: 51°44′32″N 1°14′54″W
  - elevation: 56 m (184 ft)
- Length: 40 mi (64 km)
- Basin size: 943 km^{2} (364 sq mi)
- Discharge
  - location: Oxford
  - average: 7.2 m^{3}/s (250 cu ft/s)
- Discharge
  - location: Enslow Mill
  - average: 3.84 m^{3}/s (136 cu ft/s)
- Discharge
  - location: Banbury
  - average: 1.05 m^{3}/s (37 cu ft/s)

Basin features
- Tributaries
  - left: River Ray
  - right: Sor Brook, River Swere, Mill Lane brook

The River Cherwell (/ˈtʃɑːrwɛl/ CHAR-wel or /ˈtʃɜːrwɛl/ CHUR-wel) is a tributary of the River Thames in central England. It rises near Hellidon, Northamptonshire and flows southwards for 40 miles (64 km) to meet the Thames at Oxford in Oxfordshire.

The river gives its name to the Cherwell local government district and Cherwell, an Oxford student newspaper.

== Pronunciation ==
Cherwell is pronounced /ˈtʃɑːrwɛl/, particularly near Oxford, and /ˈtʃɜːrwɛl/ in north Oxfordshire. The village of Charwelton uses the river name. It lies upriver in Northamptonshire, suggesting that the pronunciation /ˈtʃɑːrwɛl/ has long vied for use.

== Drainage basin ==
The river drains an area of 943 square kilometres (364 sq mi). The Cherwell is the second largest tributary of the Thames by average discharge (after the River Kennet).

== Course ==
=== Upper course ===
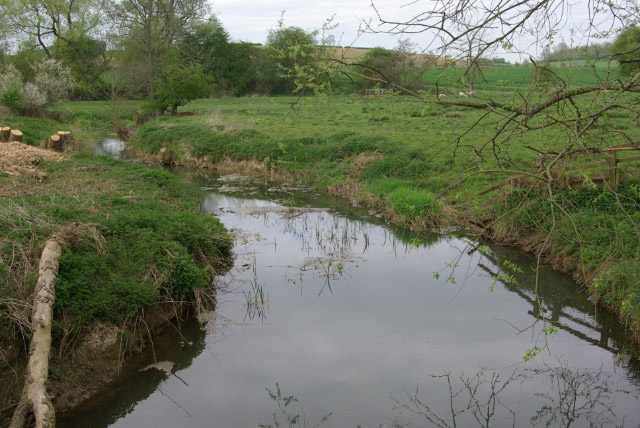
The River Cherwell near Edgcote, Northamptonshire

The Cherwell is the northernmost Thames tributary. It rises in the ironstone hills at Hellidon, 2 miles (3.2 km) west of Charwelton near Daventry. Helidon Hill, immediately north, forms a watershed: on the south side, the Cherwell feeds the Thames, in turn the North Sea; opposite, the Leam feeds the Warwickshire's Avon through Worcestershire into the Severn, the head of the Bristol Channel. Another source rises east of Charwelton and feeds headwaters of the Nene, an inflow of the North Sea at The Wash and the source of the similar River Great Ouse is nearby.

South of Charwelton, the Cherwell passes between the villages of Hinton and Woodford Halse.

Two miles further on, the river swings westward a few miles, passing below the village of Chipping Warden through Edgcote, site of a Romano-British villa, then entering Oxfordshire at Hay's Bridge on the A361's Daventry to Banbury stretch.

=== Cropredy and the Upper Oxford Canal ===
Half-a-mile north of the village of Cropredy, the Cherwell resumes south. The Oxford Canal enters the valley here, and roughly follows, on its route to Oxford until Thrupp near Kidlington. The canal connects the Coventry Canal to the Thames, and the Act of Parliament authorising it was passed in 1769. A few years earlier, Oxford merchants had proposed canalising the river as far as Banbury.

Construction of the canal began near Coventry. The canal reached Banbury in 1778, however it was a further 12 years before the southernmost section was completed and the first boats reached Oxford in January 1790.

The Cherwell skirts the east side of Cropredy itself and passes under Cropredy Bridge, site of a major battle of the English Civil War in 1644, a long encounter with riverside skirmishes concentrated along 3 miles (4.8 km) of bank between Hay's bridge and a ford at Slat Mill near Great Bourton. King Charles's forces beat the Parliamentarian army. The bridge has a plaque with words: "Site of the Battle of Cropredy Bridge 1644. From Civil War deliver us." The bridge was rebuilt in 1780 and this plaque is a facsimile of the original one. Cropredy's church holds battle relics. Local tradition holds that locals hid the church's eagle lectern in the Cherwell in case marauding soldiers damaged or stole it.

South of the bridge, the river runs through fields used for the annual Cropredy Festival, a three-day music event run by the band Fairport Convention. It then passes an ex-water mill as usual created by a weir holding back a millpond and a mill race (leat); this is the highest major mill. Upstream simpler mills are suspected from the Domesday Book and similar land returns.

=== Banbury ===
After a few miles the Cherwell passes under the M40 motorway and the industrial hinterland of Banbury, a town centred on the river, passing another mill position. From here, a main line railway runs alongside on the west side. This line was built by the Great Western Railway and links London and Oxford with Birmingham and the north. South, the railway closely follows the valley.

A Roman villa at nearby Wykham Park dates from around the year 250. Much later the Saxons built the first settlement: west of the flow. On the opposite bank is the Saxon-established Grimsbury, now absorbed into Banbury.

Banbury Castle was built in 1135 to command the river and valley. The castle was extended and rebuilt many times. In the civil war it became a Royalist stronghold and was besieged during the winter of 1644–1645. A second siege began in January 1646 and lasted until April when a surrender was negotiated. After petition to the much-empowered House of Commons in 1648, it was demolished.

A great water mill ground grain near the castle. The brick-built building and miller's cottage have been modernised and extended as Banbury's main theatre and arts centre.

=== South of Banbury ===
South of Banbury, the valley widens. On the west bank is a large housing estate built in the 1970s, Cherwell Heights, and a mile south the ancient village of Bodicote on high ground west of the river. Downstream, most of the valley's villages are similarly set back to enable flood-meadows.

After Bodicote, the river passes an industrial estate at Twyford Mill before reaching King's Sutton, a village noted for its rare, high spire which overlooks the river. At Kings Sutton the Sor and Mill Lane brooks join. Two miles further, the Cherwell reaches a neighbourhood Nell Bridge and passes under a main road leading to Aynho, a village a mile east on a low hill, overlooking.

Shortly after this comes a crossing of the Oxford Canal at a right-angle, flowing in on the east and out over a weir. Such level river crossings are rare nationally. The canal, a few yards below, has Aynho Weir Lock, unusual as instead of rectangular form, it has a wide, lozenge chamber – the lock lowers the canal by 12 inches (30 cm) – the form speedily tops up the water as often used up in the fall of locks below.

By the weir the railway's older line continues down the valley to Oxford; east of it, a more direct route (opened in 1910 by the Great Western Railway) runs via Bicester and High Wycombe to London, originally connecting Paddington station, succeeded by London's newest main terminus, Marylebone.

The Cherwell supplied water to the engines on the Oxford route, feeding long troughs on top of the sleepers between rails for scooping up water at stations or at low speed.

=== Lower course, Somerton, Heyford, Rousham and Shipton ===
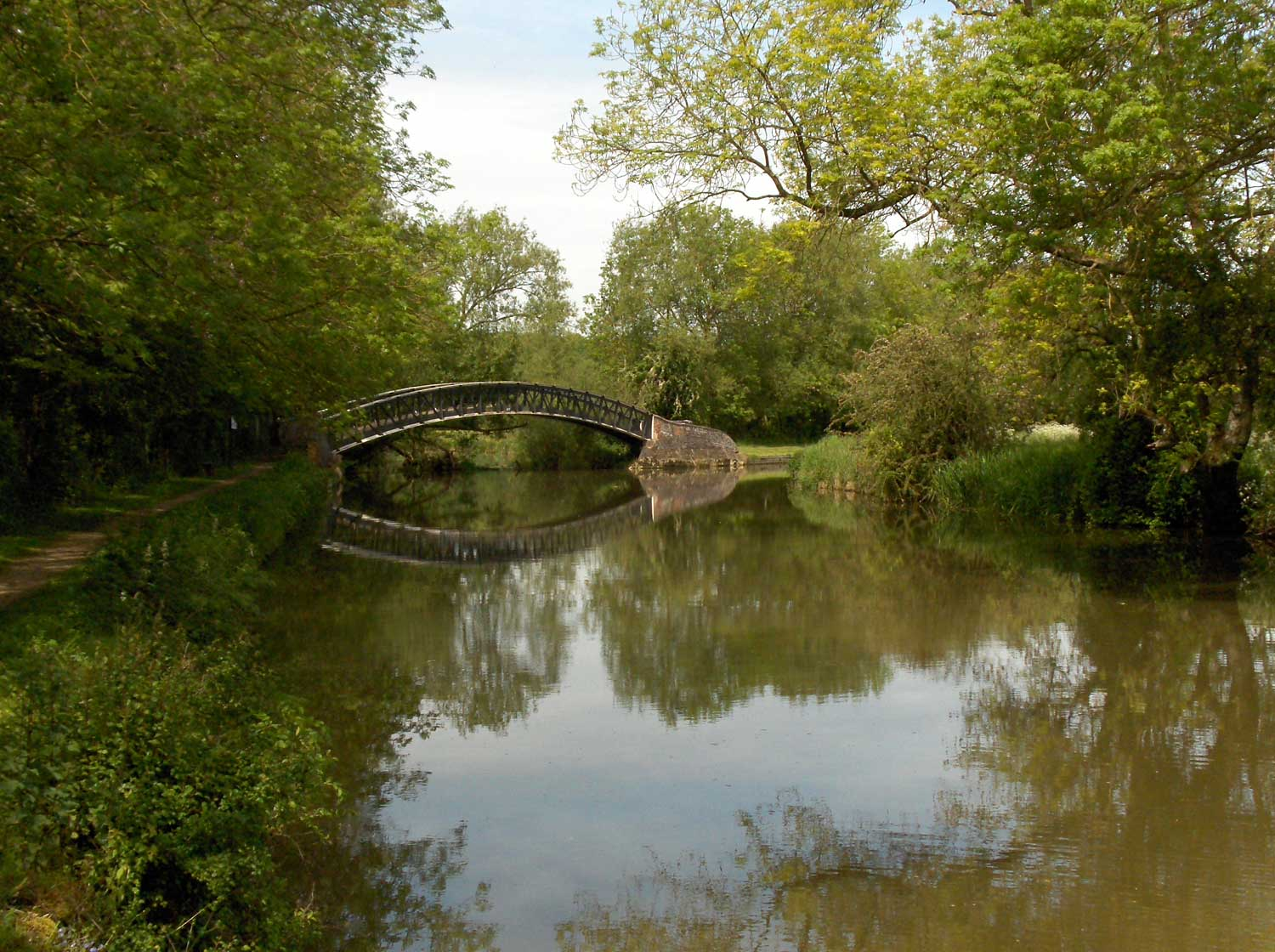
View upstream as the River Cherwell (flowing under the bridge) is joined by the Oxford Canal (coming from the right)

From Aynho, the Cherwell meanders, overlooked by hilltop villages. Somerton and Heyford, the only villages adjacent, once had water mills. That at Lower Heyford (noted as pre-Conquest and in 1086 there in the Domesday Book) was last rebuilt in the early 19th century, milling until 1946.

At Rousham, the river passes a famous landscape garden designed by William Kent. It features many statues and a near-replica Roman pagan "temple" which overlooks. The river terrace is named the Praeneste after the temple in Palestrina near Rome.

Two miles south, the river is crossed by a medieval packhorse bridge at Northbrook and a further mile south the course of Akeman Street, a Roman road. South, the valley narrows and becomes more wooded.

The Cherwell passes under the Woodstock to Bicester road and shortly after the Oxford Canal flows into it from the east. The next mile of the river is used by boats as part of the canal, passing a now-demolished cement works once supplied by canal narrowboats and which used river water.

After sharing their course for about 1 mile (1.6 kilometres), the watercourses diverge at Shipton Weir Lock (in larger, lozenge form) west of which is Shipton on Cherwell.

East of Shipton, the deserted village of Hampton Gay fronted the river, main remnants being its disused church in the watermeadows and ruins of a manor house.

Below, the river reaches Thrupp where the Oxford Canal finally leaves the valley.

In hills to the east, a Romano-British settlement stood near Kidlington and a contemporary villa in a west-bank parish, Islip. To its east is a wide plain, Otmoor, drained by the multi-headwater Ray, the largest tributary, which joins at a weir in Islip, known as The Stank.

=== The city of Oxford ===
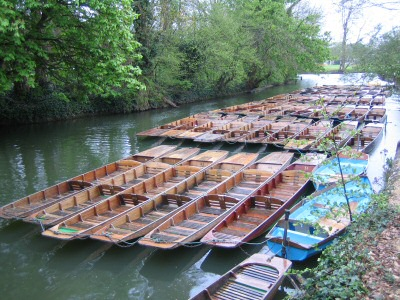
Punts on the river at Oxford

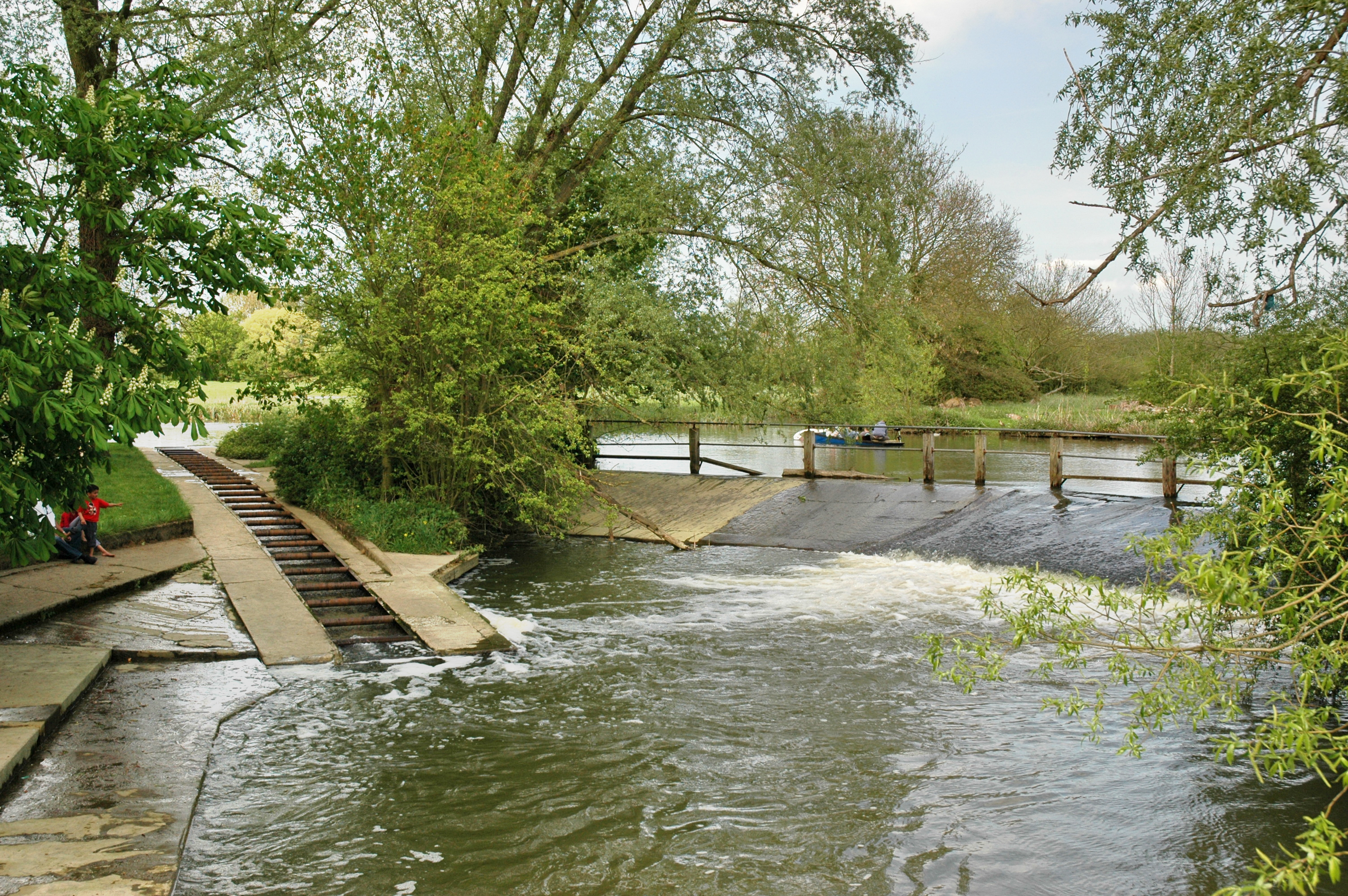
The punt rollers at "Mesopotamia" on the River Cherwell in Oxford

Entering Oxford, the average flow rate of the Thames is 17.6 m^{3}/s (620 cu ft/s) then exiting after taking in the Cherwell it is 24.8 m^{3}/s (880 cu ft/s).

The Cherwell reaches the northern outskirts of Oxford and runs south on the eastern edge of North Oxford to the city centre. Near Summertown it passes the Victoria Arms riverside public house/restaurant at Marston and then under a modern bridge, part of Marston Ferry Road. A little further south, it passes Wolfson College (a graduate college of the University of Oxford), the Cherwell Boathouse (where punts can be hired) and the playing fields of the Dragon School. Next is Lady Margaret Hall, the first of the previously all-women's colleges.

The river is then flanked by Oxford University Parks and passes under Rainbow Bridge. Parson's Pleasure and Dame's Delight were for typically nude bathing for men and women respectively, now defunct. Below the Parks, the river splits into up to three streams, with a series of islands. One is Mesopotamia, which is a long thin island just south of the Parks with a scenic, tree-lined path. At the northern end are punt rollers next to a weir. St Catherine's College is on the largest island formed by the split of the river. It also flows past Magdalen College.

The river conjoins again into two close streams to flow under Magdalen Bridge. Early on May Morning, students used to jump off the bridge, a dangerous tradition if the river is low, so more recently the bridge has been closed on May Day. The river splits again. To the west is the Oxford Botanic Garden. To the east are Magdalen College School and St Hilda's College. The river then skirts Christ Church Meadow before flowing into the Thames (or Isis) through two branches; the island in between has the main shared college boathouses for rowing.

Easter and Summer punting is popular on the Oxford stretch. (A punt is a long, flat-bottom, low-topsides, boat propelled by a pole pushed against the river bed.) Punts are typically hired from a punt station by Magdalen Bridge, or the Cherwell Boathouse (just to the north of the University Parks). It is possible to punt all the way from the Isis, north past the University Parks, and out beyond the ring road.

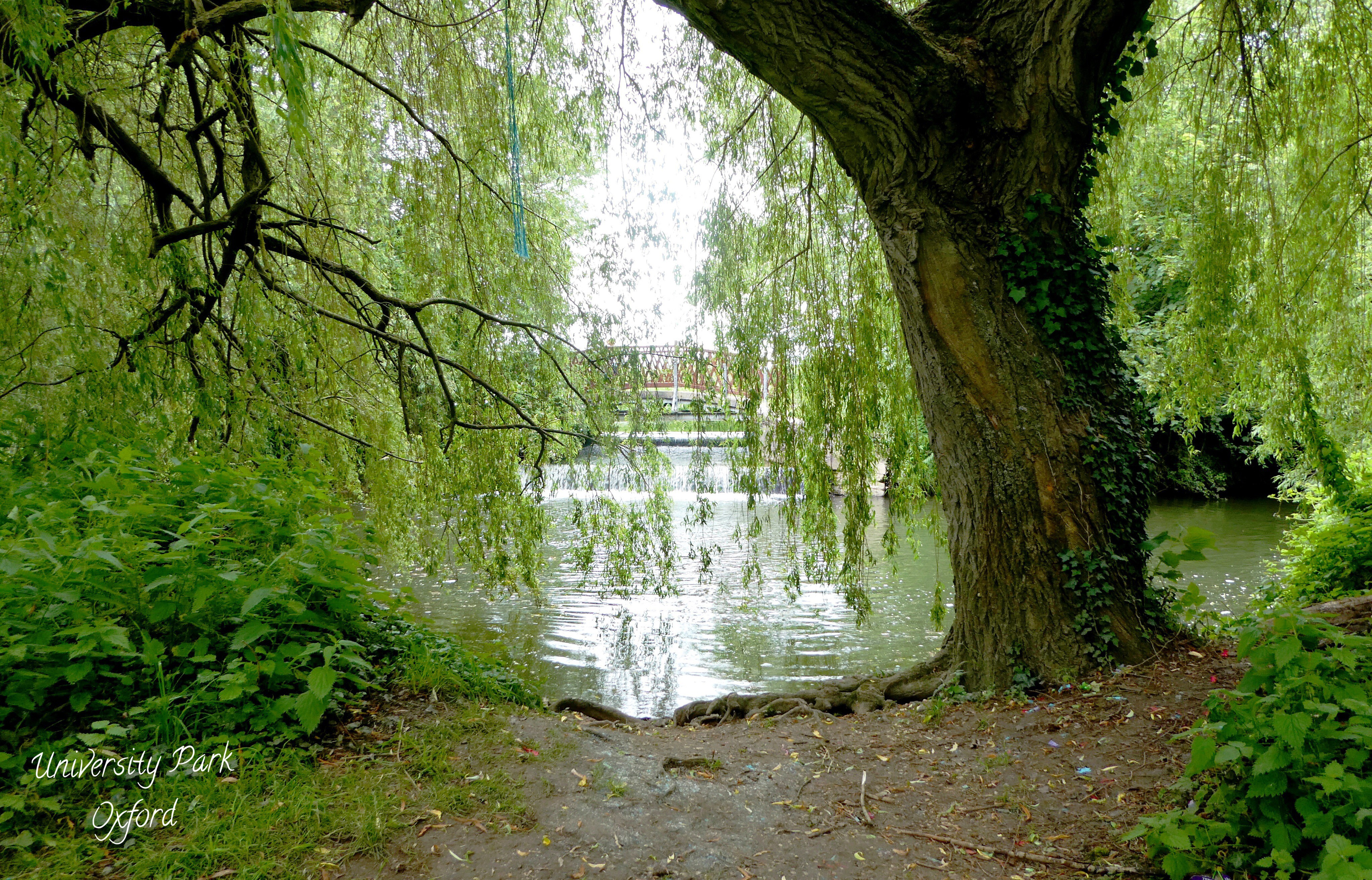
Tolkien may have based his drawing of the evil character Old Man Willow on a willow tree beside the River Cherwell in Oxford, like this one in the University Parks there.

== History ==
The lowest point saw early settlement. The river is known as the divide of the Dobunni to the west and the Catuvellauni to the east (Celtic tribes documented at the time of Romanisation).

At Oxney, Oxford a Romano-British settlement grew up, being naturally protected from raids by the large rivers. This settlement dominated the pottery trade in what is now central southern England, distributing it by boats on the Thames and its tributaries.

In 2023, a Viking sword from between 850 and 975AD was found in the river.

== Navigation ==
The river itself has never been properly navigable. In the 17th century weirs were fewer and goods seem to have been laden up to Banbury in modest flat-bottomed boats. A load of coal was taken up the river in 1764 as a test. Since the opening of the Oxford Canal in 1790 only a few sections are navigable, mainly to canoes and punts of shallow draft.

== In literature ==
The Cherwell was mentioned by John Betjeman (1906–1984) in his poetry:

The Cherwell carried under Magdalen Bridge
Its leisure puntfuls of the fortunate
Who next term and the next would still come back.

The Withywindle river in J. R. R. Tolkien's fantasy The Lord of the Rings has been identified with the Cherwell near Tolkien's home in Oxford. Growing beside the Withywindle was the evil character Old Man Willow; Tolkien made a careful pencil and coloured pencil drawing of the character while he was writing the chapter "The Old Forest". Tolkien's son John suggests that the drawing was based on one of the few unpollarded willows on the Cherwell at Oxford. The Tolkien Society and the Mythopoeic Society have placed a Tolkien memorial bench beside the Cherwell in the University Parks.

== See also ==
- Tributaries of the River Thames
- List of rivers in England

Next confluence upstream	River Thames	Next confluence downstream
Castle Mill Stream (north)	River Cherwell	Hinksey Stream (south)
