= North Oxford =

Suburb of Oxford, England

Coordinates: 51.774°N 1.266°W

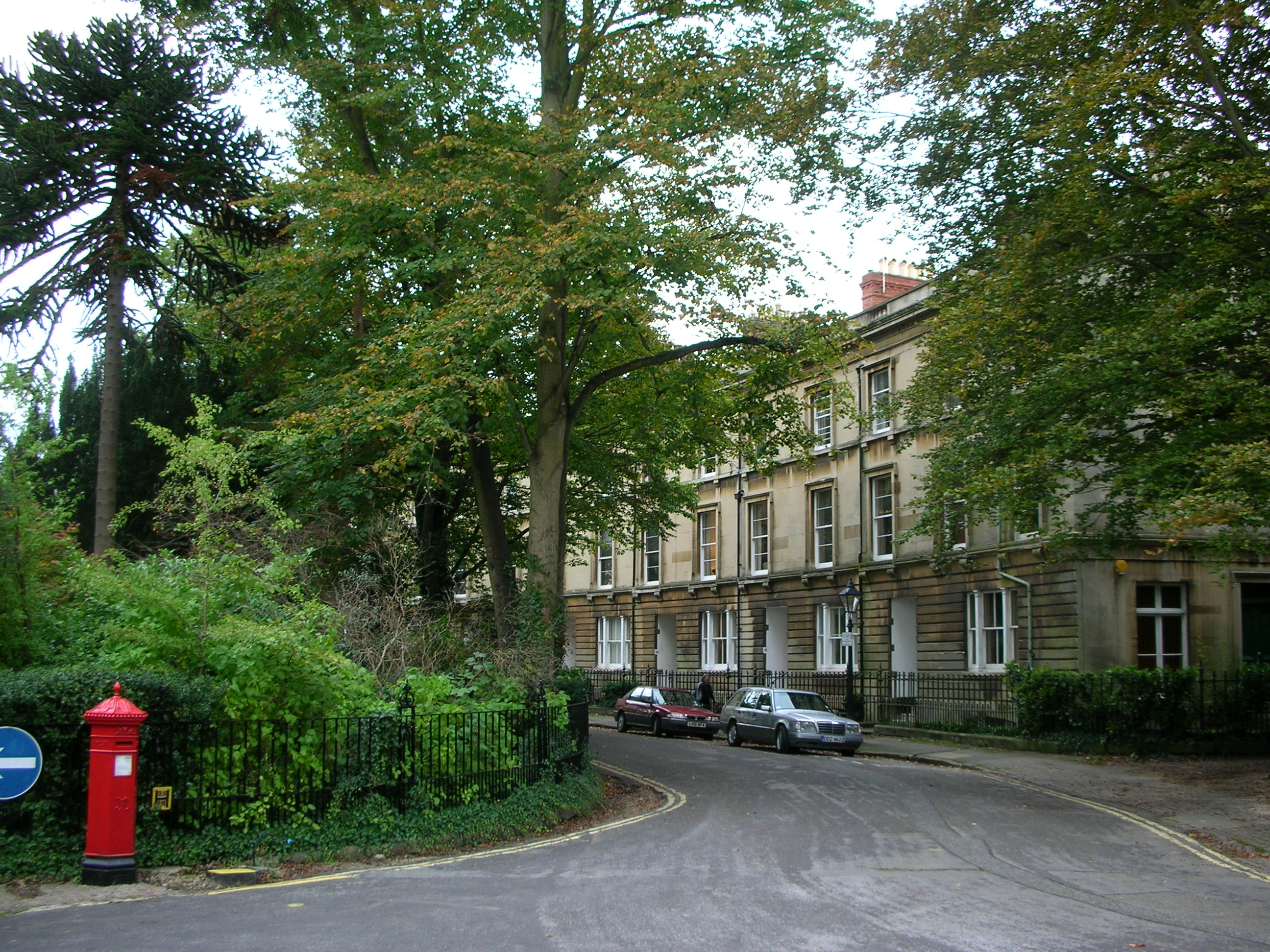
- Park Town, one of central North Oxford's earliest Victorian suburban developments

- Location within Oxfordshire
- OS grid reference: SP509079
- Civil parish: unparished
- District: Oxford
- Shire county: Oxfordshire
- Region: South East
- Country: England
- Sovereign state: United Kingdom
- Post town: Oxford
- Postcode district: OX2
- Dialling code: 01865
- Police: Thames Valley
- Fire: Oxfordshire
- Ambulance: South Central
- UK Parliament: Oxford West and Abingdon
- Website: Oxford City Council

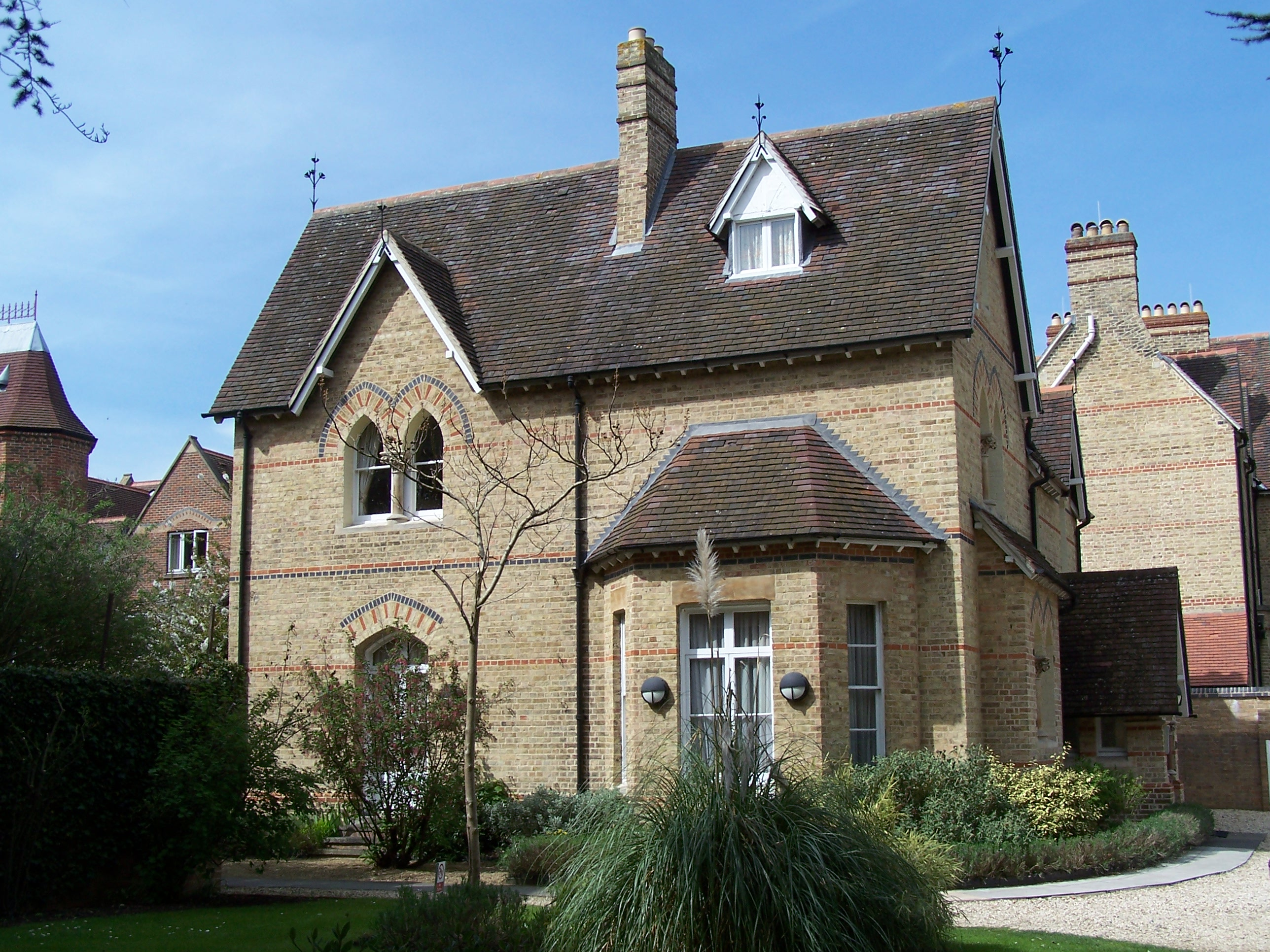
37 Banbury Road, St Anne's College, a typical North Oxford Gothic house

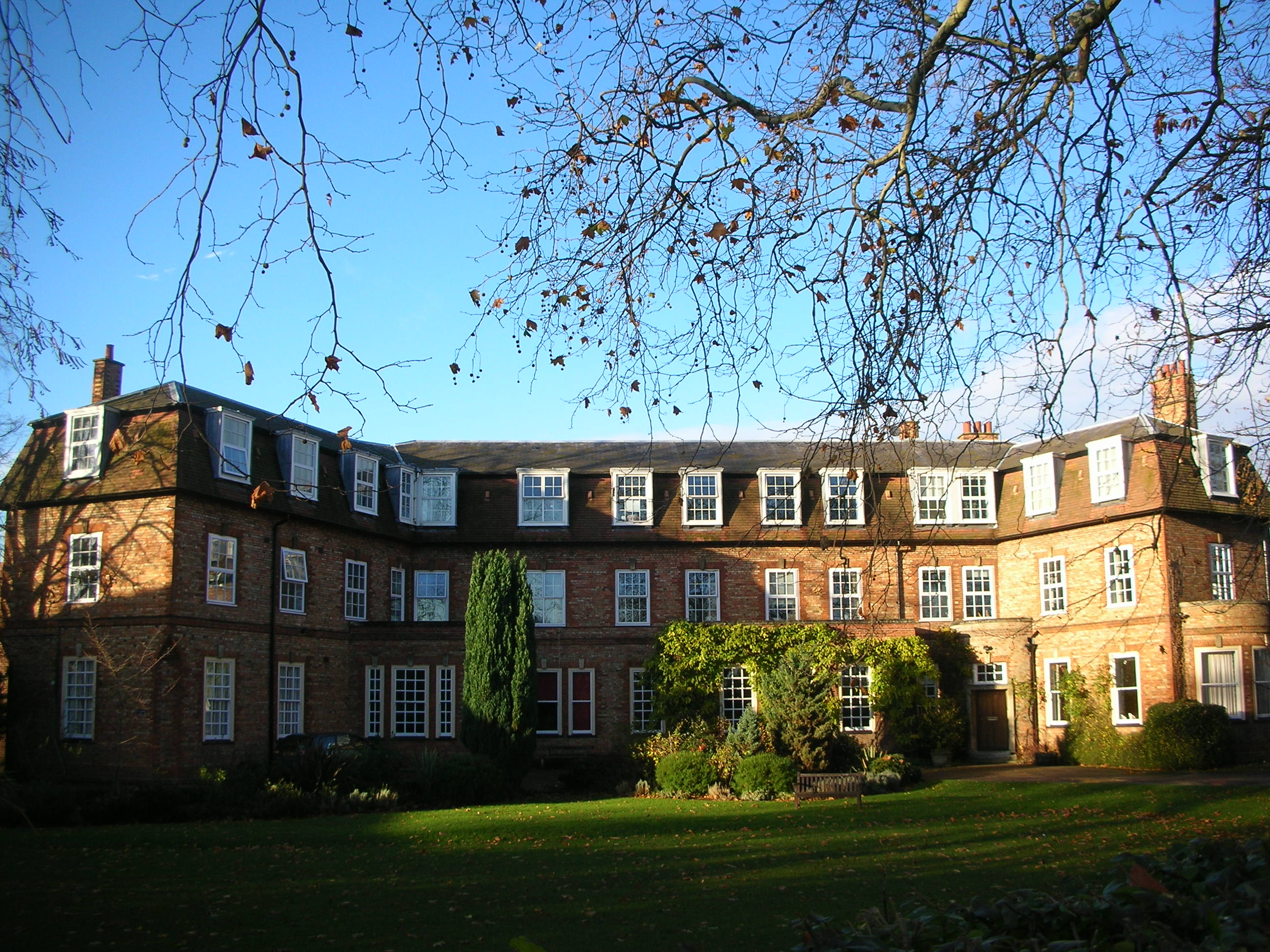
School House at the Dragon School on Bardwell Road

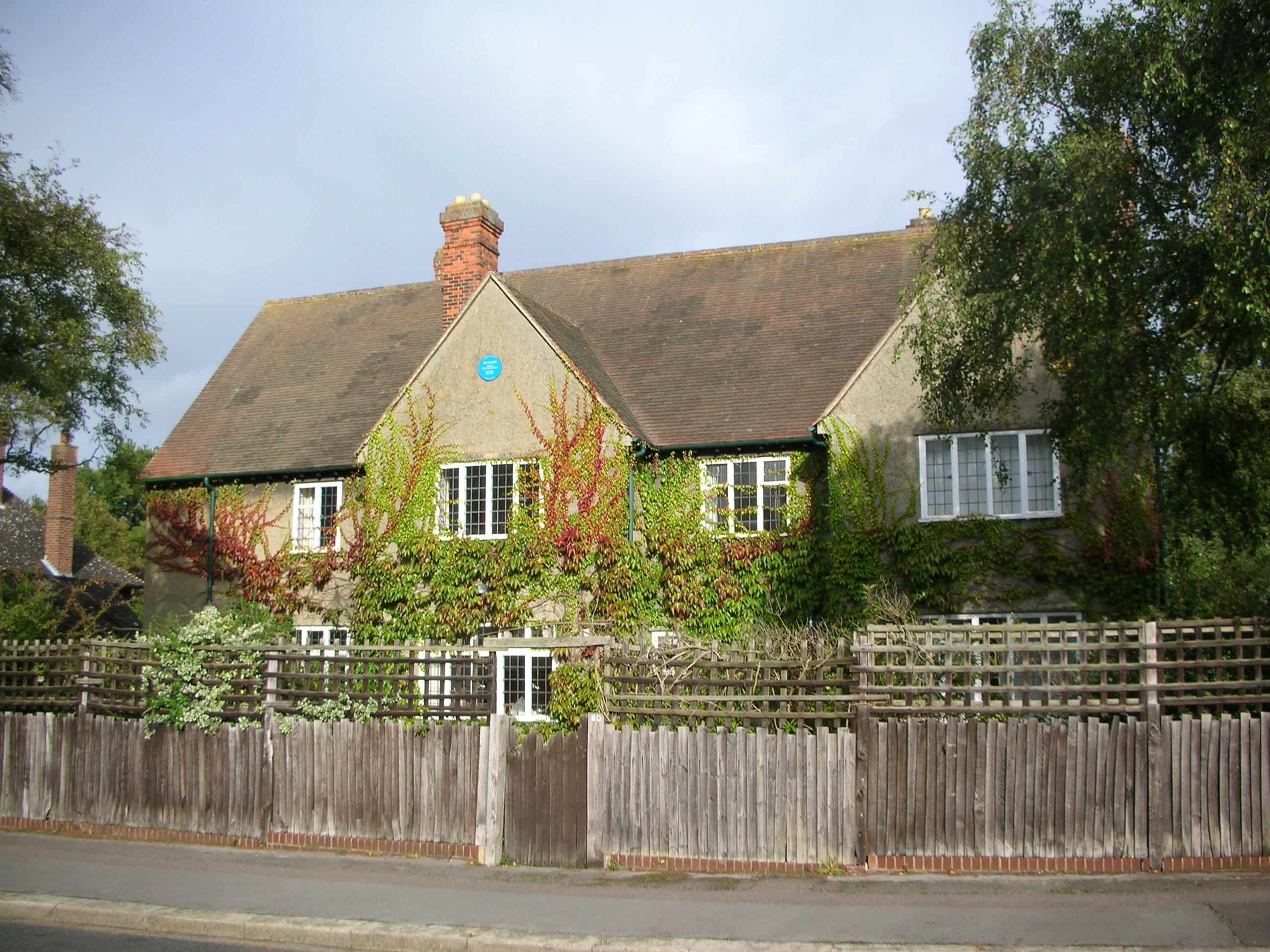
The former home of the author and academic J. R. R. Tolkien, 20 Northmoor Road

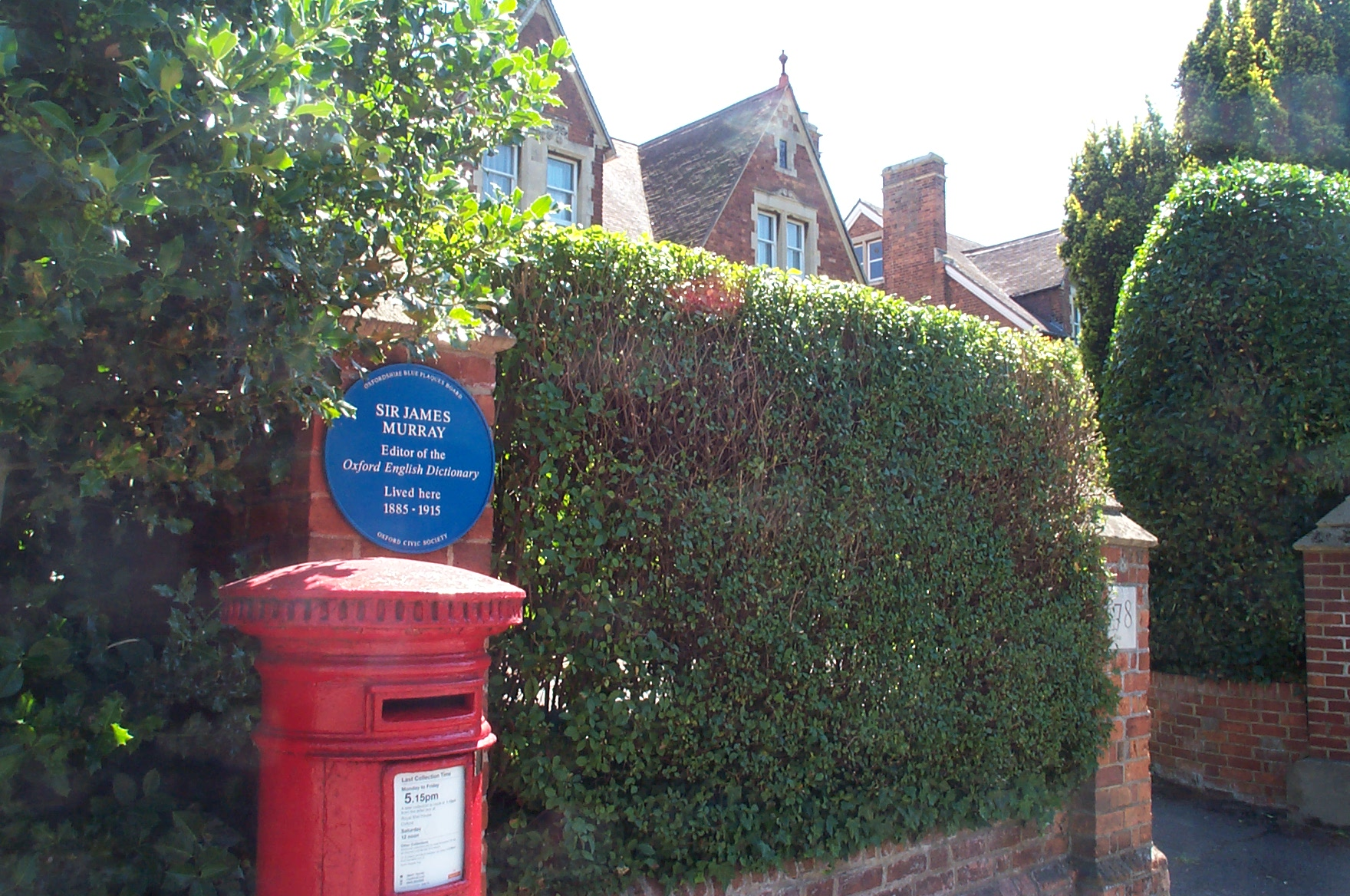
The former residence of the Victorian lexicographer James Murray, first editor of the Oxford English Dictionary, at 78 Banbury Road

North Oxford is a suburban part of the city of Oxford in England. It was owned for many centuries largely by St John's College, Oxford and many of the area's Victorian houses were initially sold on leasehold by the college.

== Overview ==
The leafy roads of Woodstock Road to the west and Banbury Road to the east (leading to Woodstock and Banbury respectively) run north-south through the area, meeting at their southern ends to become St Giles. North Oxford is noted for its schools, especially its private schools. These include the Dragon School and Summer Fields (formerly Summerfield), which are preparatory schools, and St Edward's School and the Oxford High School for Girls, Wychwood School and d'Overbroeck's College which are secondary schools and St. Clare's, Oxford, an international sixth form college which is the longest provider of the International Baccalaureate Diploma in England (source ISA).

== Geography ==
The boundary of "North Oxford" is not exactly defined, but the original area developed by St John's College (sometimes now called "Central North Oxford") runs north from the top end of St Giles' to approximately Kingston Road, Frenchay Road, Staverton Road, and Marston Ferry Road, south of Summertown. It includes Park Town, Norham Manor, and the eastern parts of Walton Manor.

Four of Oxford University's former women's colleges, Lady Margaret Hall, St Anne's, St Hugh's and Somerville (at the southern extreme) are located in North Oxford. There are also four graduate colleges, Green Templeton College (formerly Green College), St Antony's, both off the Woodstock Road, Kellogg on Banbury Road, and to the east Wolfson, on the River Cherwell. To the south of the college is the Cherwell Boathouse, a popular punting spot. Further south, also bordering the Cherwell, are the University Parks, to the north of which is Norham Gardens, with large houses backing onto the park, including Gunfield. A large open area of ancient common land, Port Meadow, adjoining the River Isis (the section of the River Thames that flows through Oxford) is located to the west.

Much of the central area contains excellent examples of late 19th-century Victorian Gothic architecture, and is now a conservation area. The conservation area includes three Grade I listed buildings, the Church of St Philip and St James (which now houses the Oxford Centre for Mission Studies), the Observer's House (now Osler House), and the Radcliffe Observatory; the latter two are now both part of Green Templeton College. There are Regency-style houses built in the mid-19th century in the crescents of Park Town, initially in the middle of the countryside but now surrounded by the rest of the suburb.

Central North Oxford between the city centre and Summertown, has been described as the most desirable suburb of Oxford, England. It is popularly supposed that it was originally developed for the dons of the university once they were allowed to marry. However central North Oxford in particular includes many large houses which were then unaffordable by most dons, and the houses were instead occupied by successful tradesmen of the city. Today, many homes are occupied by rich London commuters, attracted by the good schools. A number of the larger houses are used by Oxford colleges and other educational establishments.

At the northern extremity of North Oxford, which is approximately the line of the A40 (the northern bypass, part of the Oxford ring road) are three suburbs, Sunnymead and Cutteslowe (to the east of Banbury Road) and Wolvercote to the west of Woodstock Road. Beyond the bypass is the village of Kidlington. Wolvercote Cemetery contains the grave of J. R. R. Tolkien (note that Wolvercote Cemetery is not in Wolvercote itself, but beside Banbury Road north of the A40). Cutteslowe Park is a large open area just to the north of this bypass.

== Notable people ==
North Oxford has attracted famous residents, such as the authors and academics J. R. R. Tolkien (1892–1973) and Iris Murdoch (1919–1999). Murdoch lived with her husband and fellow academic John Bayley, and the area was featured in the biographical film, Iris. T. E. Lawrence (known as Lawrence of Arabia) grew up in Polstead Road, North Oxford.

Sir John Betjeman (1906–1984), Poet Laureate, was an enthusiast about North Oxford and wrote poems mentioning the area, such as May-Day Song for North Oxford:

Belbroughton Road is bonny, and pinkly bursts the spray
Of prunus and forsythia across the public way,
For a full spring-tide of blossom seethed and departed hence,
Leaving land-locked pools of jonquils by sunny garden fence.

And a constant sound of flushing runneth from windows whence
The toothbrush too is airing in this new North Oxford air.

== See also ==
- Norham Manor
- Walton Manor
- Acland Hospital
- Cherwell Boathouse
- Oxford Ecohouse
- St Philip and St James Church
- Moreton Road

== Bibliography ==
- Eleanor Chance; et al. (1979). Crossley, Alan; Elrington, C. R. (eds.). Victoria County History: A History of the County of Oxford. Vol. 4.
- Curl, James Stevens (1977). The Erosion of Oxford. Oxford Illustrated Press. ISBN 0-902280-40-6.
- Graham, Malcolm (1992). "North Oxford". Images of Victorian Oxford. Alan Sutton Publishing. pp. 85–94. ISBN 0-86299-967-7.
- Hinchcliffe, Tanis (1992). North Oxford. New Haven: Yale University Press. ISBN 0-300-05184-0.
- Sherwood, Jennifer; Pevsner, Nikolaus (1974). The Buildings of England: Oxfordshire. Harmondsworth: Penguin Books. ISBN 0-14-071045-0.
- Snow, Peter (1991). Oxford Observed. London: John Murray (Publishers). pp. 157–173. ISBN 0-7195-4707-5.
- Symonds, Ann Spokes (1997). The Changing Faces of North Oxford. Vol. Book One. Robert Boyd Publications. ISBN 1-899536-25-6.
- Symonds, Ann Spokes (1998). The Changing Faces of North Oxford. Vol. Book Two. Robert Boyd Publications. ISBN 1-899536-33-7.
- Tyack, Geoffrey (1998). Oxford: an architectural guide. Oxford & New York: Oxford University Press. ISBN 0-19-817423-3.
