= Canterbury Road =

Road in North Oxford, England

Coordinates: 51.76537°N 1.26212°W

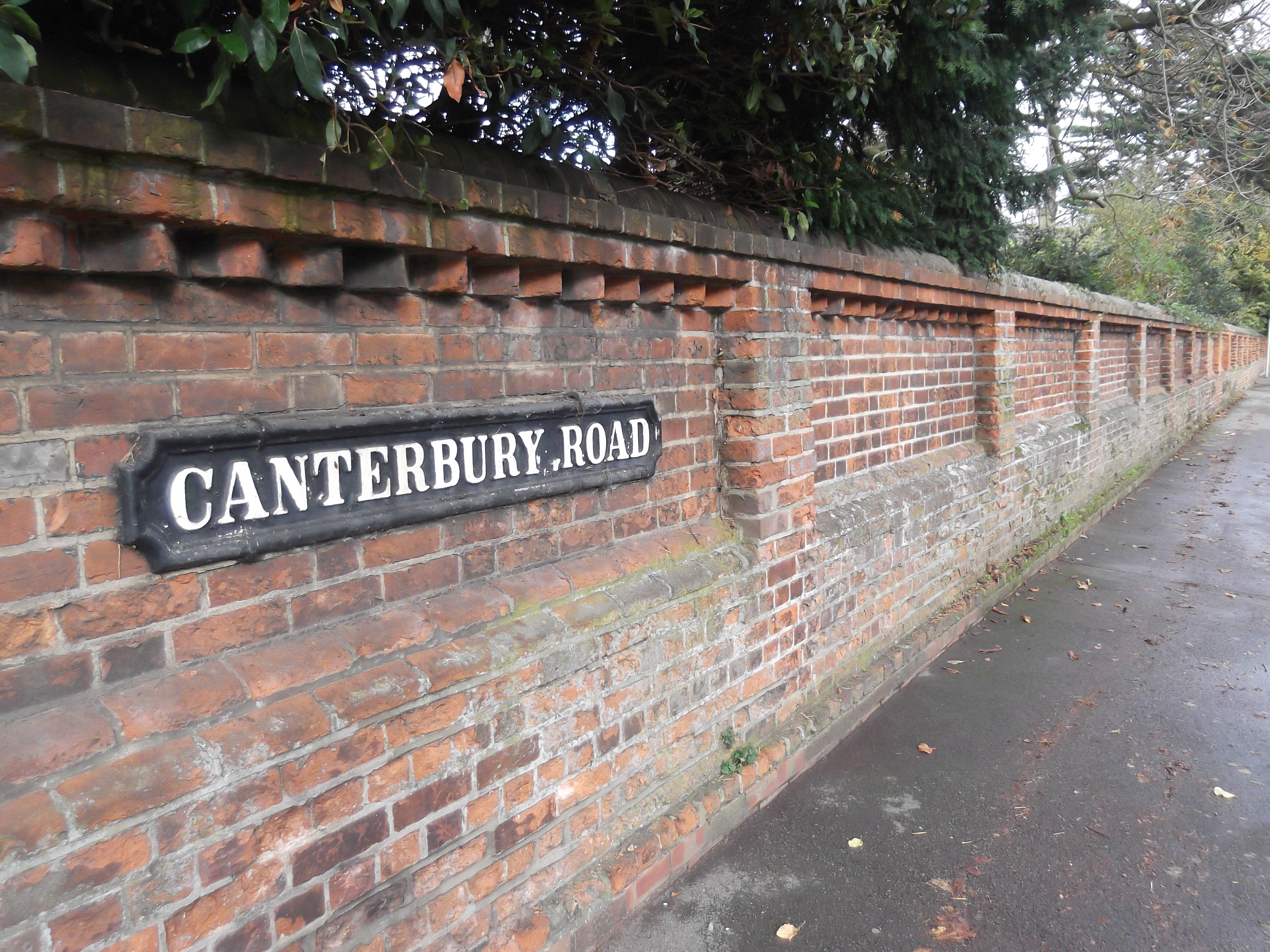
The wall on the north side of Canterbury Road at the western end near Woodstock Road.

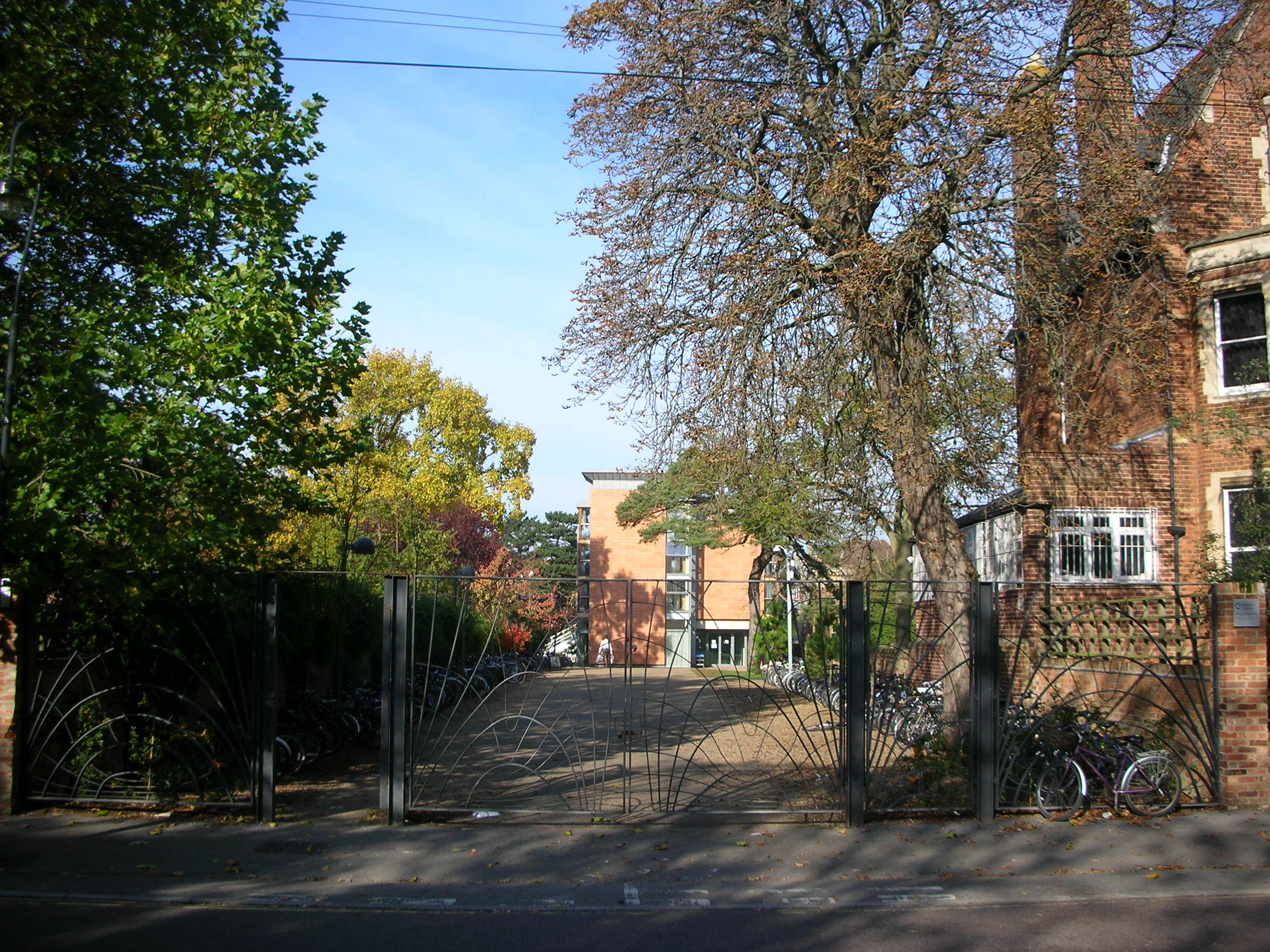
The ornamental gates at the rear of St Hugh's College, on the north side of Canterbury Road at the junction with Winchester Road.

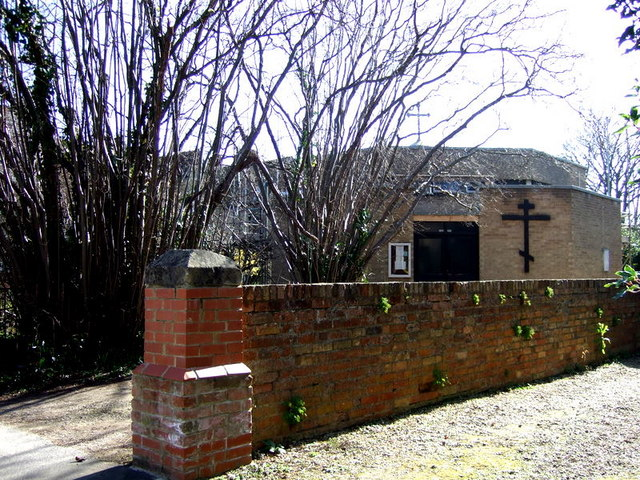
The Orthodox Church of the Holy Trinity and the Annunciation at 1 Canterbury Road.

Canterbury Road is a road in North Oxford, England. It runs between Woodstock Road to the west and Banbury Road to the east. Winchester Road leads south from halfway along Canterbury Road, linking with Bevington Road that runs parallel to the south. Also to the south are North Parade and Church Walk.

To the north is St Hugh's College, one of the former women's colleges of the University of Oxford (now mixed), fronting onto St Margaret's Road to the north and also stretching between Woodstock Road and Banbury Road. There are some modern ornamental iron gates opposite the junction with Winchester Road, giving access to the college grounds.

The Eastern Orthodox Church of the Holy Trinity and the Annunciation, built in 1973, is at 1 Canterbury Road.

The area was formerly part of the estate of St John's College, Oxford, and the road is named after the city of Canterbury in honour of the former Archbishops of Canterbury who were also Presidents of the College (William Laud and William Juxon).

The road contains large, expensive brick-built Gothic-style detached residences. They were designed by Frederick Codd in the 1870s and leased between 1873 and 1884. These houses have been described as "Codd at his best" by Pevsner.

The Rev. W. A. Spooner (1844–1930), Warden of New College, Oxford and eponymous word transposer, lived at 1 Canterbury Road during his retirement.
