= Cavell =

Cavell may refer to:

== Places ==
- Cavell, Arkansas, unincorporated community, United States
- Cavell Creek, Alberta, Canada
- Edith Cavell Bridge, Otago, New Zealand
- Mount Edith Cavell, Alberta, Canada

== Other ==
- Cavell (name)
- Elliston & Cavell, a former department store in Oxford, England
- The Cavell Van

== See also ==
- Cavill (disambiguation), a related surname
