= Winchester Road, Oxford =

Road in North Oxford, England

Coordinates: 51.76436°N 1.26272°W

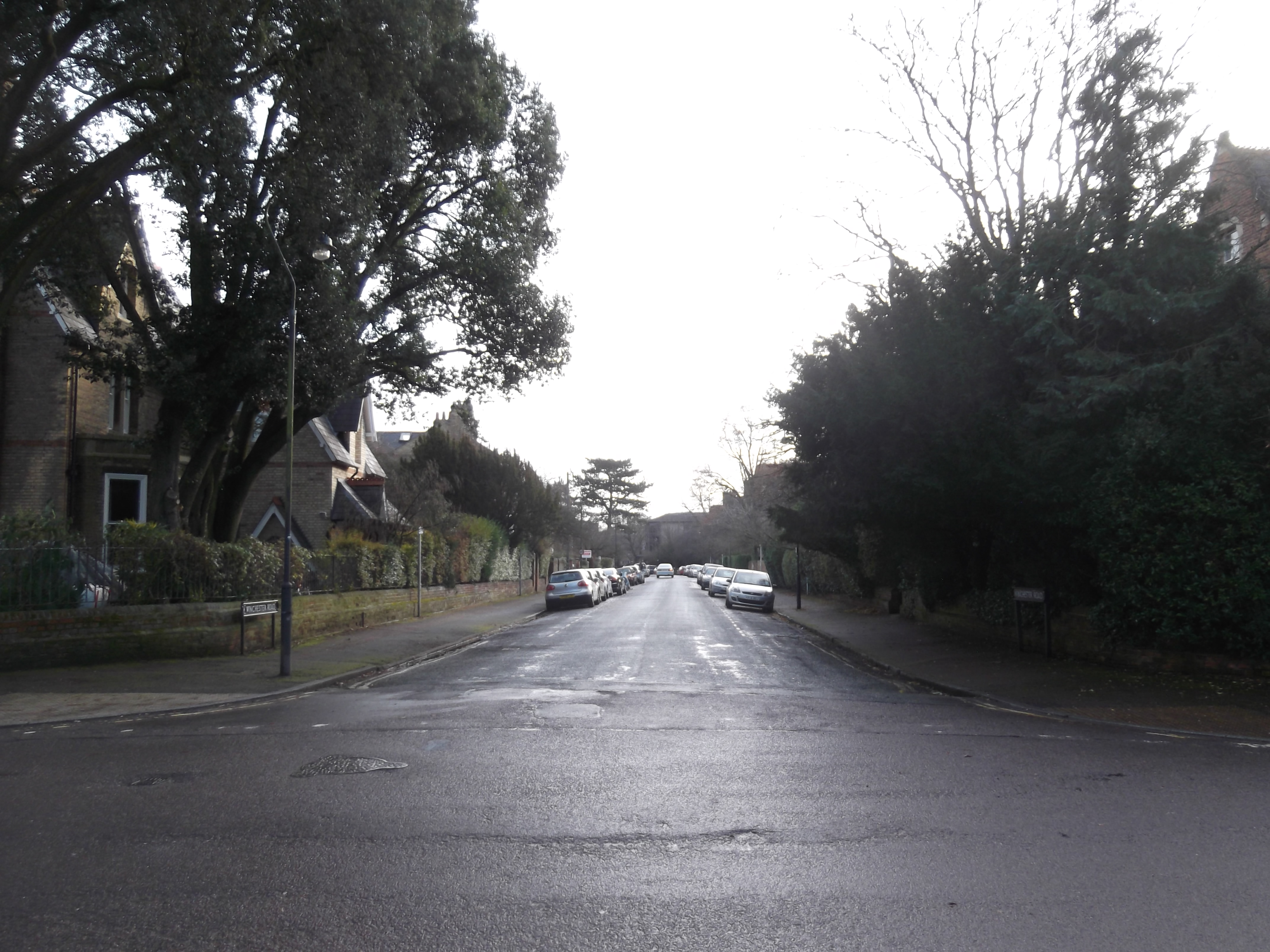
Winchester Road looking south from Canterbury Road.

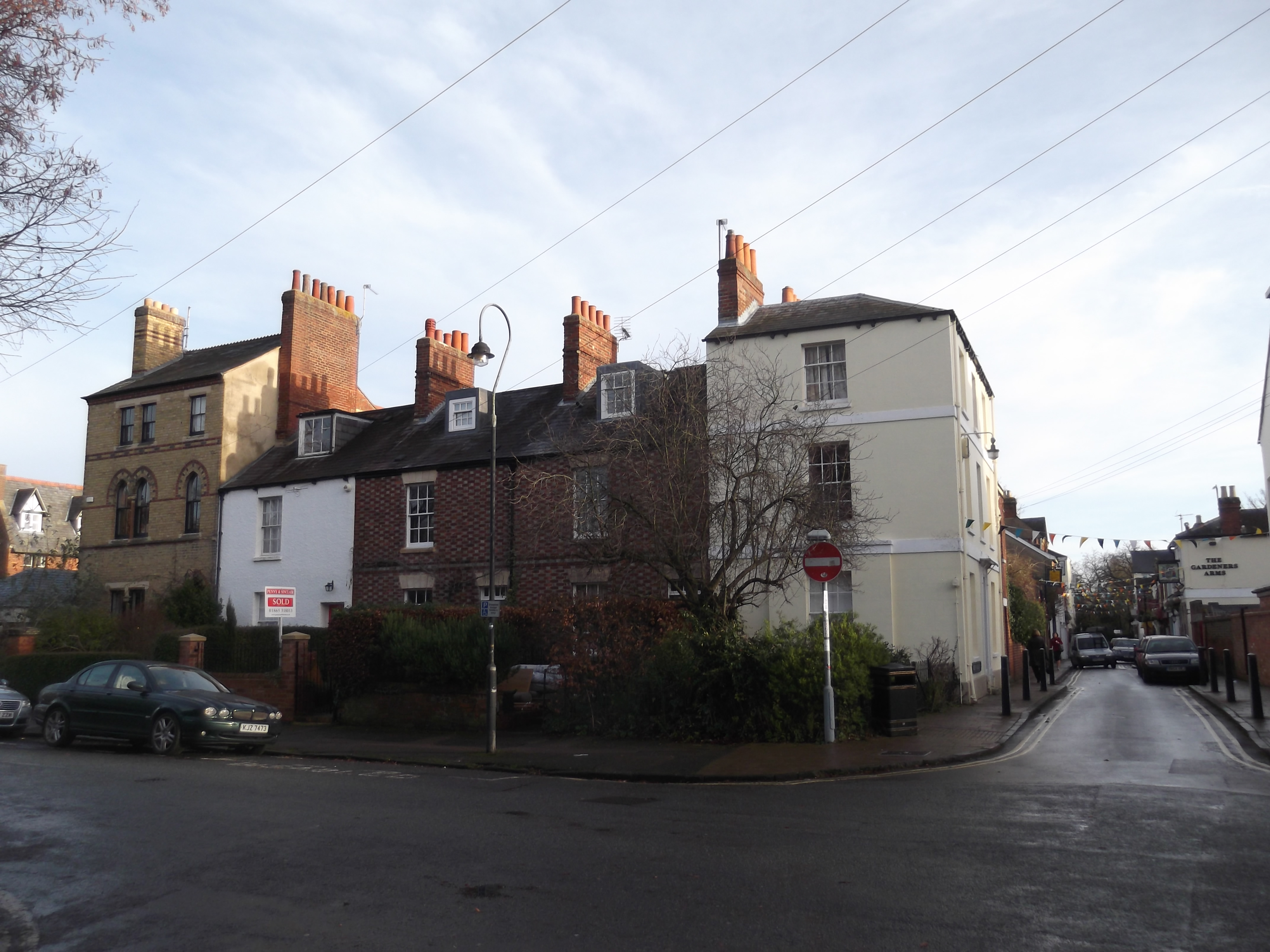
Houses on Winchester Road with North Parade on the right.

Winchester Road is a road in North Oxford, England. It runs north–south between and roughly parallel with Woodstock Road to the west and Banbury Road to the east. It is in a desirable area with high house prices.

== History and name ==
The area was formerly part of the estate of St John's College, and the road is named after the city and see of Winchester, whose bishop is the Visitor of the college. Most of the houses are in the Victorian Gothic style, largely built between 1875 and 1882, designed by architects including Frederick Codd, William Cross, and William Wilkinson.

== Local area ==
At the southern end is Bevington Road, with St Anne's College, a former women's college of the University of Oxford, opposite. At the northern end is Canterbury Road, with St Hugh's College, another of the university's former women's colleges, opposite. Some modern ornamental iron gates at the junction with Winchester Road give access to the college's grounds.

A little more than halfway up the road, there is a junction with North Parade, containing local shops, to the east and Church Walk (with through access for pedestrians only) to the west.

Towards the southern end on the west side is St Antony's College, a graduate college of the university. The Nissan Institute of Japanese Studies is at 27 Winchester Road, in the precincts of St Antony's College. This houses the Bodleian Japanese Library.

Also to the east, just north of Church Walk, there is a good view of the tower and spire of the St Philip and St James Church, now the Oxford Centre for Mission Studies (an institution accredited by Middlesex University).

== Gallery ==
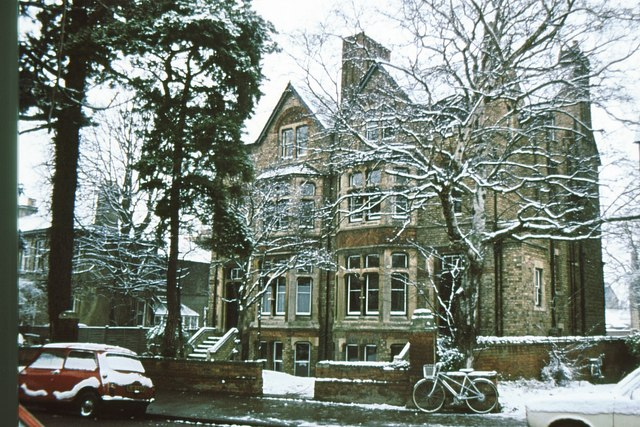
8 and 9 Winchester Road, designed by William Wilkinson (1876) in the Victorian Gothic style, and now used for student accommodation by Hertford College, Oxford.

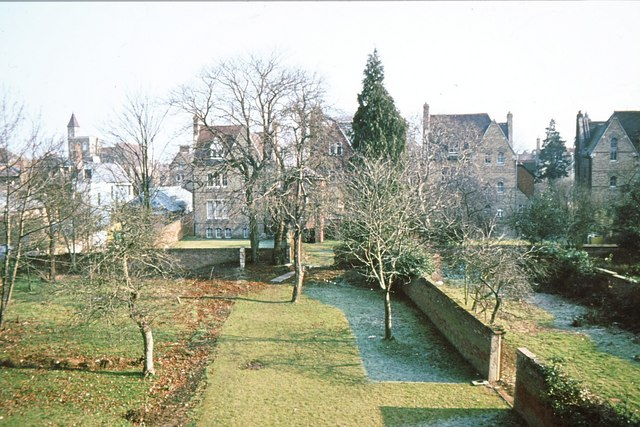
The gardens of 7–9 Winchester Road, looking towards Banbury Road.

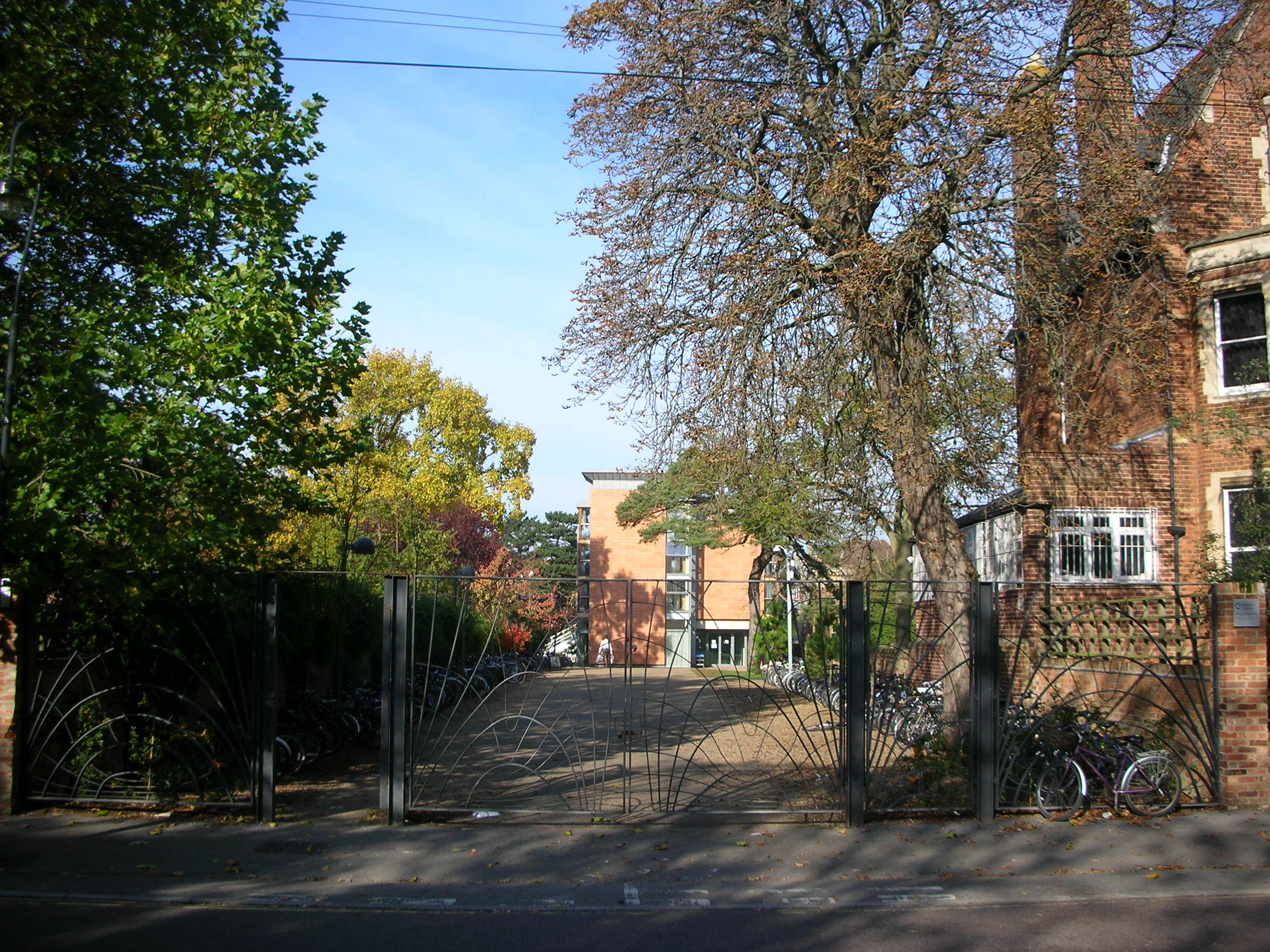
The rear entrance of St Hugh's College, at the northern end of Winchester Road at the junction with Canterbury Road.

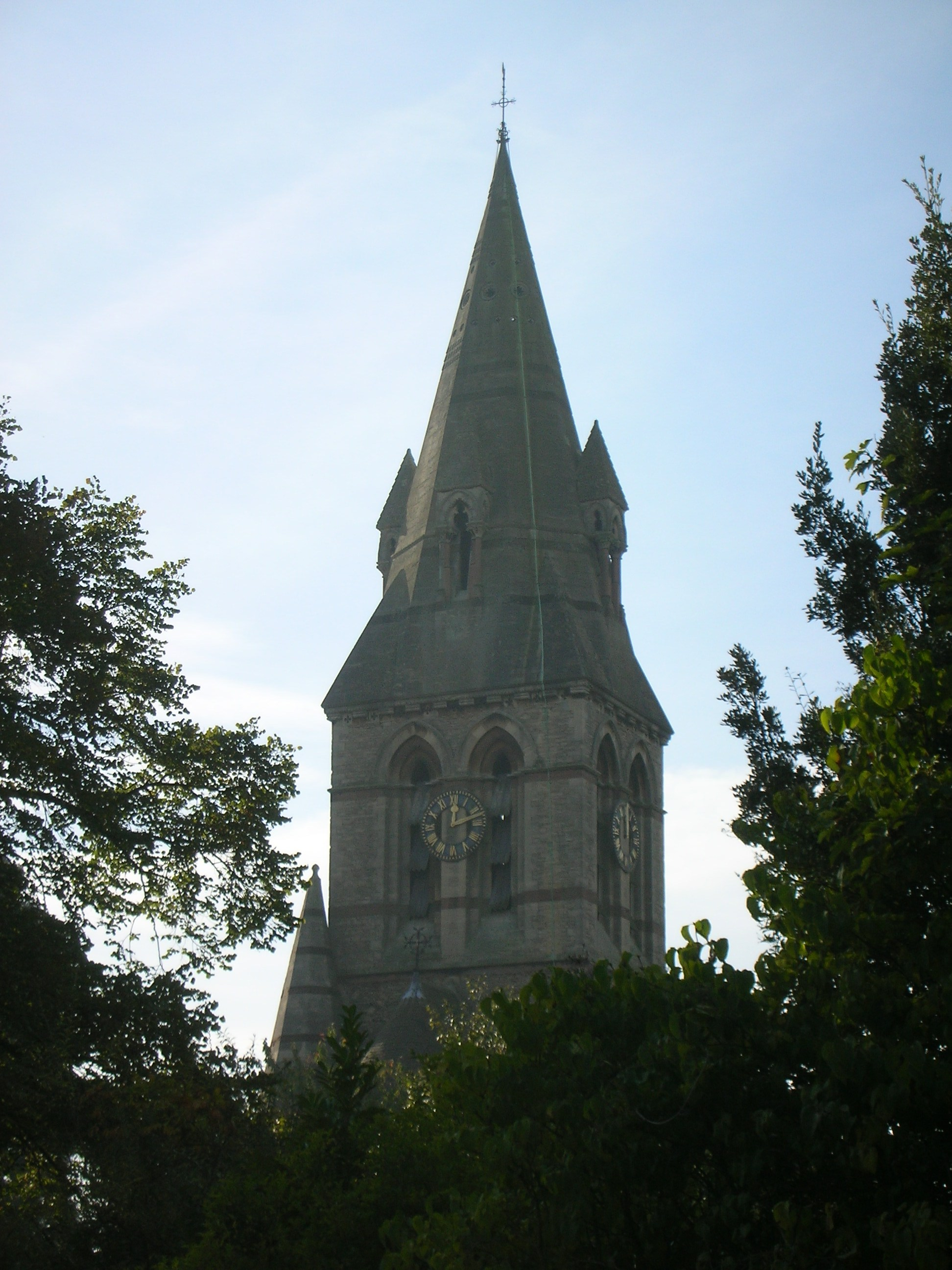
View of St Philip and St James Church, designed by G. E. Street, from the north end of Winchester Road.

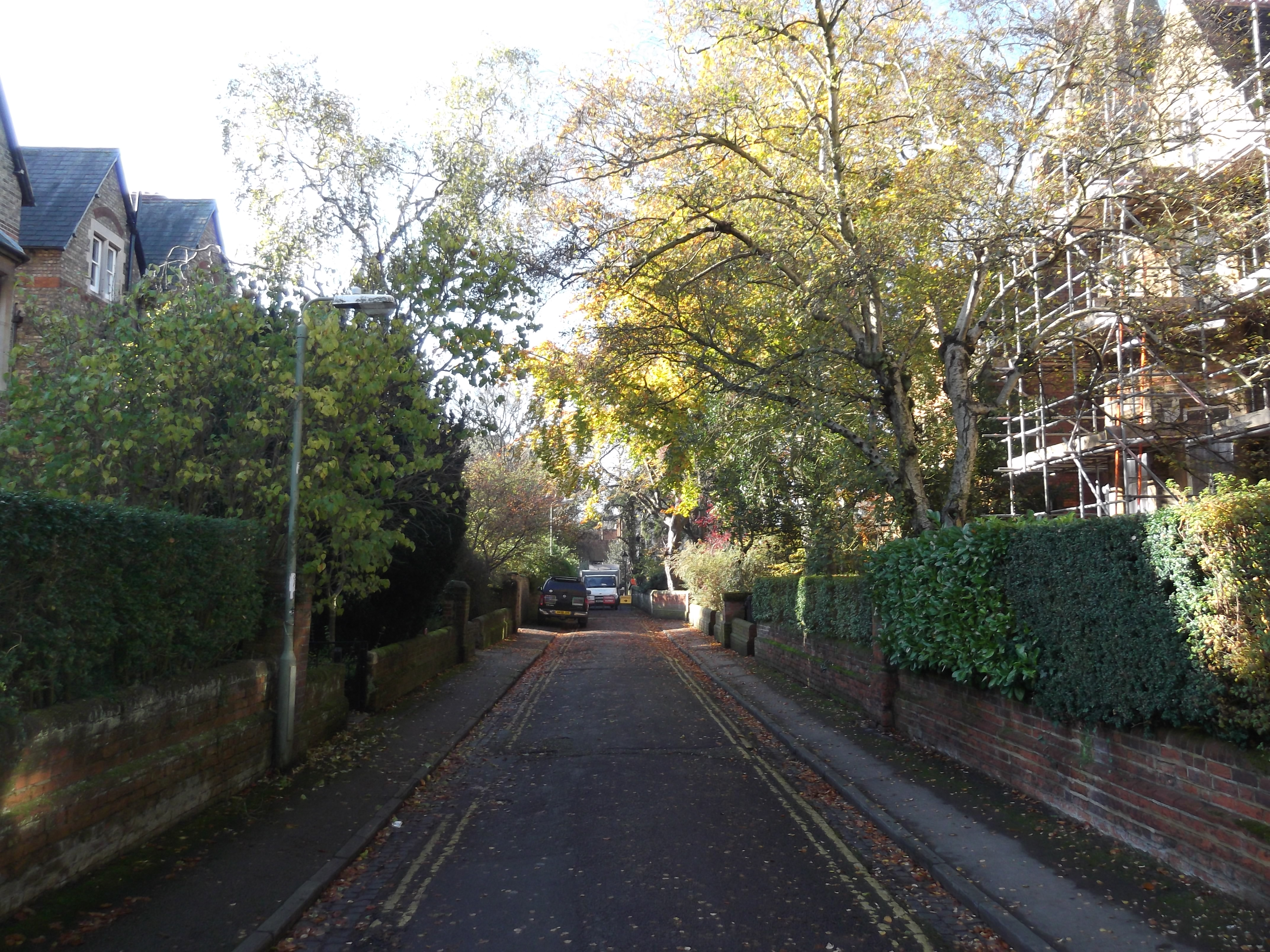
View west along Church Walk from the junction with Winchester Road in the summer.

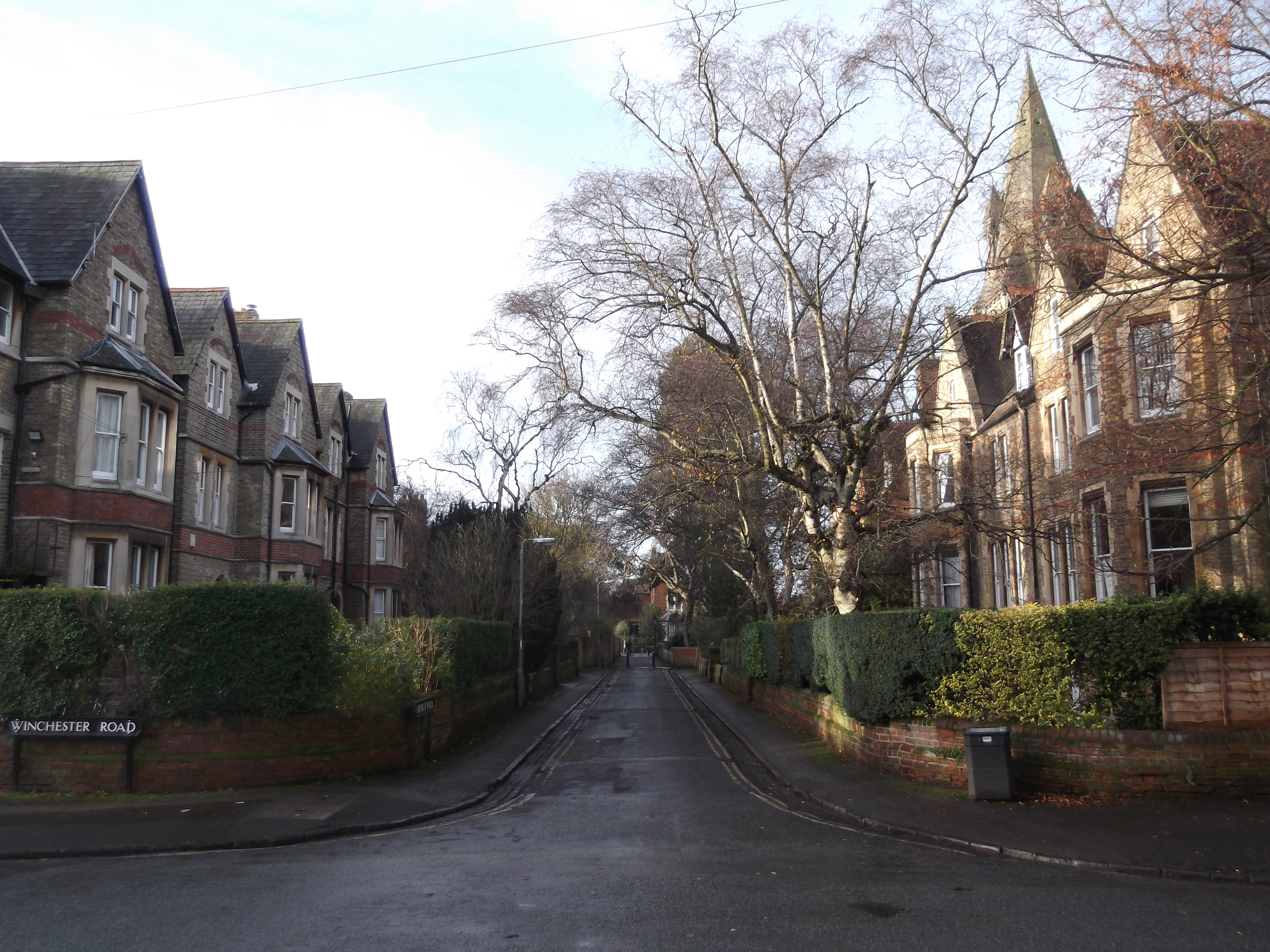
Looking west along Church Walk from the junction with Winchester Road in winter.
