= Cavil =

Cavil may refer to:

- John Cavil, a fictional character from the re-imagined Battlestar Galactica television series
- Kwame Cavil (born 1979), Canadian Football League wide receiver

== See also ==
- Cavell (name), a related surname
