= Oxford Centre for Mission Studies =

Former Church in Oxford, England

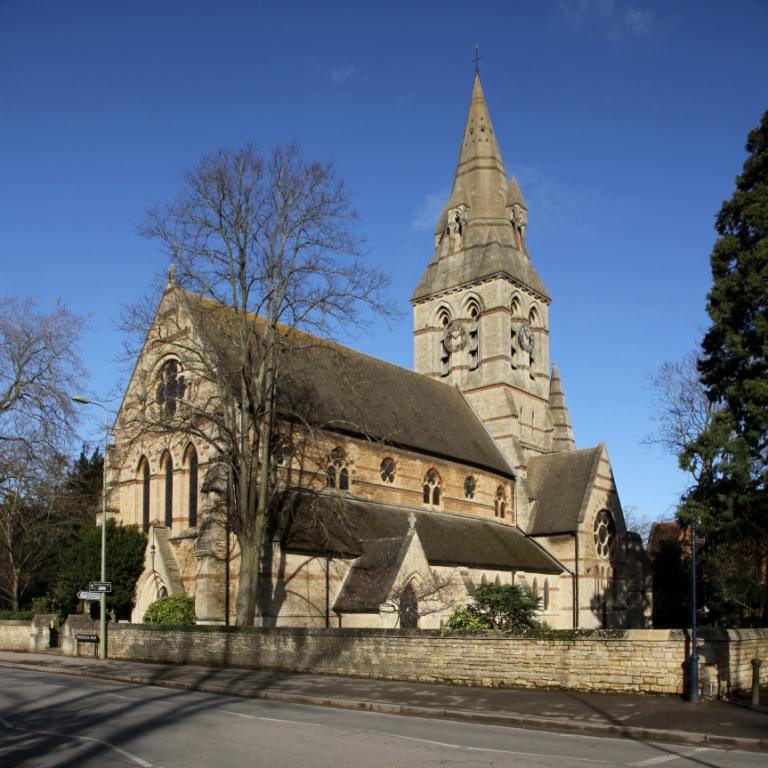
- Oxford Centre for Mission Studies
- 51°45′52″N 1°15′51″W
- OS grid reference: SP 50890 07557
- Location: Woodstock Road, Oxford OX2 6HR
- Country: England
- Website: www.ocms.ac.uk

History
- Former name(s): Parish church of SS Philip and James
- Dedication: Philip and James
- Dedicated: 8 May 1862
- Consecrated: 8 May 1862

Architecture
- Architect: George Edmund Street
- Architectural type: parish church
- Style: Gothic Revival
- Years built: 1860–1862; 164 years ago, 1864–1866 (tower and spire 1864)

Administration
- Province: Canterbury
- Diocese: Oxford
- Archdeaconry: Oxford
- Deanery: Oxford
- Parish: SS Philip and James with St Margaret, Oxford

The Oxford Centre for Mission Studies (OCMS) is in the former SS Philip and James Parish Church on Woodstock Road, Oxford, England, opposite Leckford Road. It was established in 1983 by Rev. Vinay Samuel.

The centre exists to provide education for church leaders from the non-Western world. It was founded by mission theologians from Africa, Asia and Latin America. OCMS offers taught Masters courses and PhD/MPhil research degrees. Its degrees are validated by Middlesex University. It is associated with the University of Oxford through the Bodleian Libraries. Many Oxford faculty members also provide supervision for PhD/MPhil research degrees. OCMS is a charity.

== Building ==
The building was designed by the Gothic Revival architect George Edmund Street and built in 1860–62. Samuel Wilberforce, then Bishop of Oxford, consecrated it as the parish church of Saints Philip and James on 8 May 1862. The tower and spire, also designed by Street, were added in 1864–66. It is a Grade I listed building.

Immediately to the south is Church Walk, a pedestrian-only link between Woodstock Road and North Parade. On the south side of Church Walk is the former vicarage, 68 Woodstock Road, designed by Street's former assistant, Harry Drinkwater, and built in 1887. The vicarage is a Grade II listed building and is now part of St Antony's College, Oxford.

== Sources ==
- Sherwood, Jennifer; Pevsner, Nikolaus (1974). Oxfordshire. The Buildings of England. Harmondsworth: Penguin Books. pp. 297–298. ISBN 0-14-071045-0.
