= South Parade =

Shopping street in North Oxford, England

Coordinates: 51°46′41″N 1°16′04″W

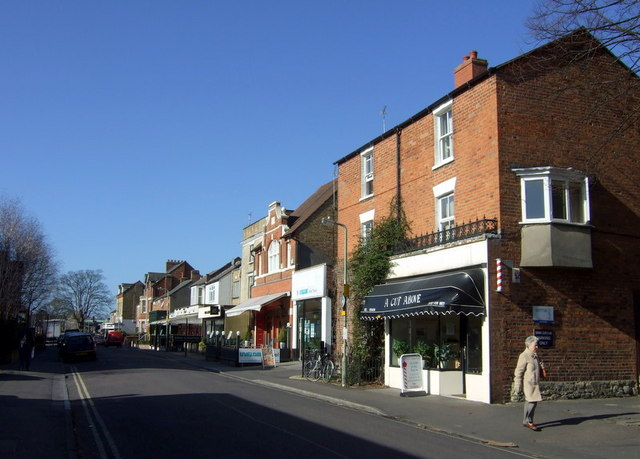
View along South Parade

South Parade is a shopping street or parade in Summertown, north Oxford, England. It runs between Woodstock Road to the west and Banbury Road to the east, where there are also shops stretching south from South Parade.

This area of the Banbury Road and South Parade form the main shopping centre of Summertown and indeed of North Oxford. As well as shops, there are a number of restaurants located here. To the west, South Parade leads into St Edward's School and the North Wall Arts Centre.

== Origin of the name ==
South Parade is north of North Parade in central North Oxford. It is often claimed that during the Civil War when Charles I was besieged by Oliver Cromwell at Oxford, South Parade was the Roundhead southern front, while North Parade was the location of the Royalist northern front during the siege of Oxford. However, "[i]t is unlikely that the two sides would have come so close to each other without engaging in combat and, in any case, parade grounds are known to have existed elsewhere in and around the town".

The Encyclopaedia of Oxford claims that "[i]n 1930, when Summertown became part of the city, Double Ditch was renamed South Parade, supposedly on the suggestion of a German professor said to be an authority on Oxford history" but other sources date the renaming to 1890–91. It is certainly the case that "until the 1870s, it was the most southerly limit of the Whorestone [Farm] Estate." To summarise:

North Parade was one of the earliest developments on St. John's leasehold land, soon after 1855, and was so called from the start ... South Parade was known by that name at least as early as 1859. We do not know which got its name first, but when either was named there would have seemed no need to consider the existence of the other. One was in Oxford, the other in a village out in the County. In terms of Oxford, North Parade was north; in terms of Summertown, South Parade was south. When Summertown was made part of Oxford, the names illogically remained.
