= Marc Cavell =

Marc or Mark Cavell may refer to:

- Marc Cavell (actor) (1939–2004), American actor
- Marc Cavell (artist) (1911–1989), British kinetic artist
- Mark Cavell, character in The Man from the Alamo
