= Banbury Road =

Arterial road in Oxford, England

Coordinates: 51.78133°N 1.26652°W

A4165

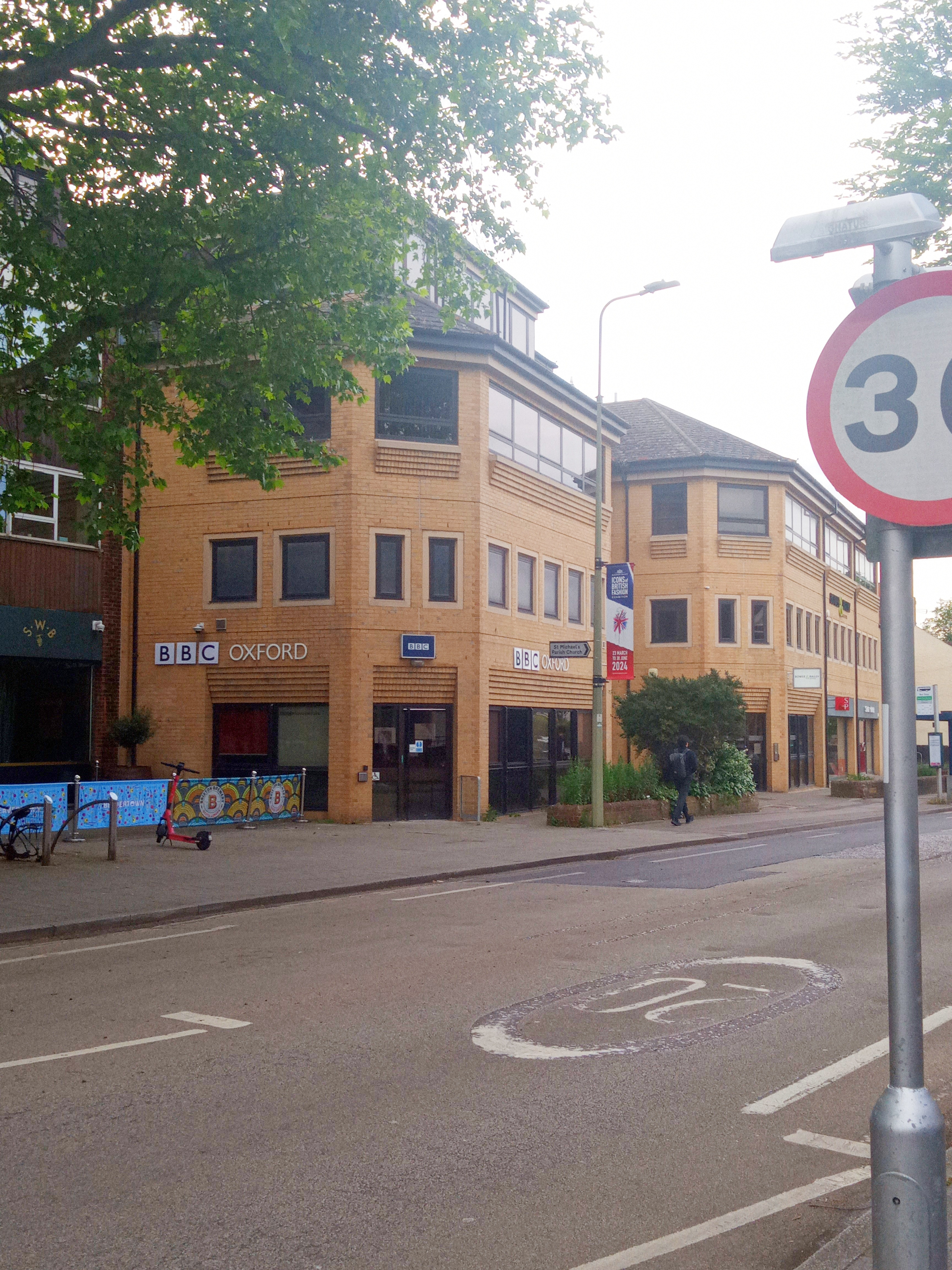

Route information
- Length: 3.7 mi (6.0 km)

Major junctions
- South end: Oxford
- A4144; A40 A4260
- North end: Near Kidlington

Location
- Country: United Kingdom
- Constituent country: England

Road network
- Roads in the United Kingdom; Motorways; A and B road zones

Banbury Road is a major arterial road in Oxford, England, running from St Giles' at the south end, north towards Banbury through the leafy suburb of North Oxford and Summertown, with its local shopping centre. Parallel and to the west is the Woodstock Road, which it meets at the junction with St Giles'. To the north, Banbury Road meets the Oxford Ring Road at a roundabout. The road is designated the A4165 (which continues for a short distance as Oxford Road to Kidlington). Prior to the building of the M40 motorway extension in 1990, the road formed part of the A423 from Maidenhead to Coventry.

== Buildings ==
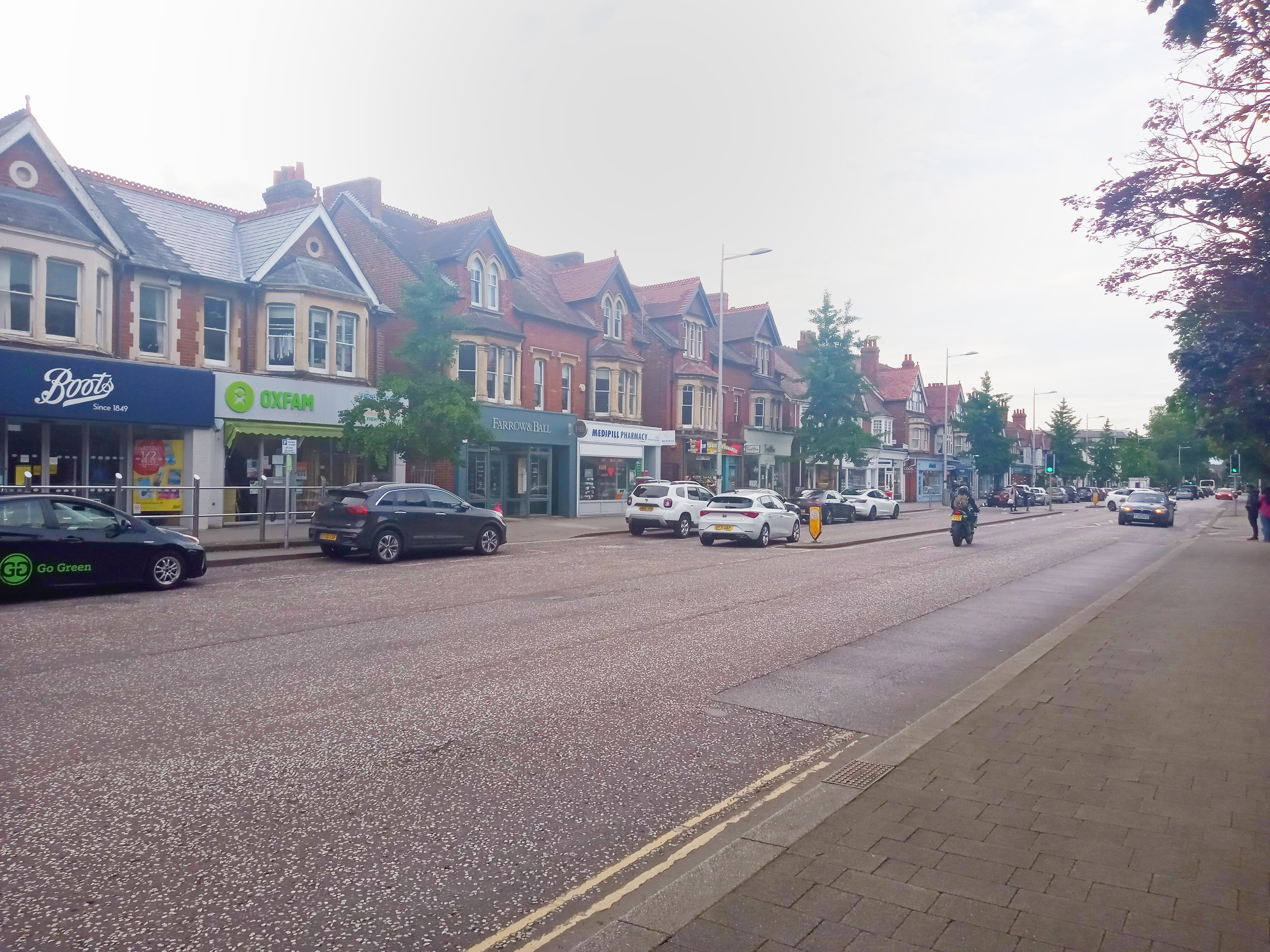
Shops on Banbury Road in Summertown.

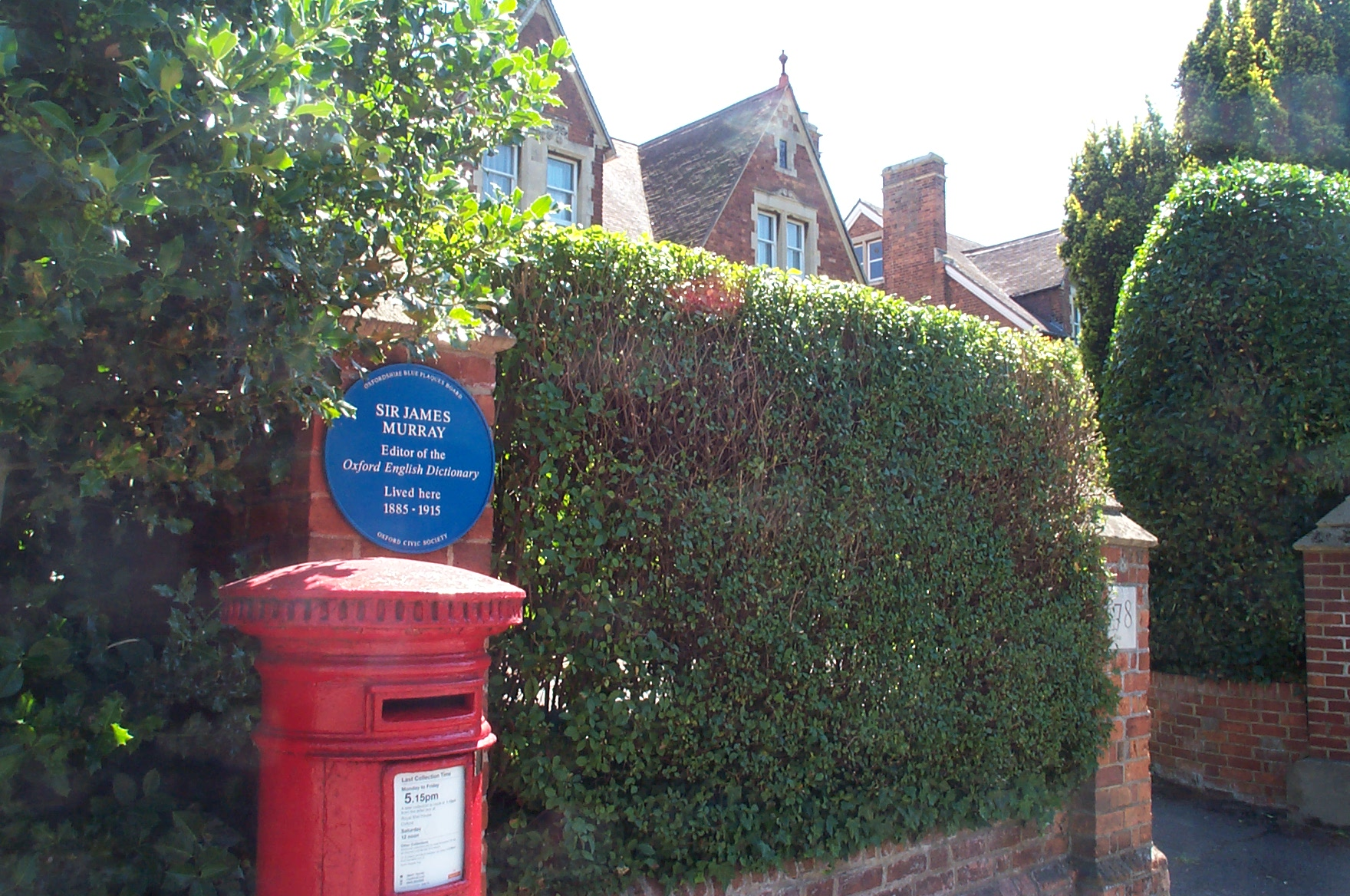
The former residence of the lexicographer James Murray, first editor of the Oxford English Dictionary, at 78 Banbury Road, opposite the junction with St Margaret's Road. Note the pillar box in front of the house, installed because of the volume of post that he sent, with a commemorative blue plaque behind, added in 2002.

The former Mathematical Institute of Oxford University is at the lower end of the road on the east side. Opposite Keble Road is St Giles' Church, built in 1120 and consecrated in 1200. Further north are the Denys Wilkinson Building (astrophysics) and the prominent 1960s Thom Building of the Engineering Science department.

One of the university's former women's colleges, St Anne's College backs onto Banbury Road and another, St Hugh's College, flanks the road further up. Kellogg College and Wycliffe Hall, which are also part of the university are situated on Banbury Road, near to the junction with Bevington Road. The Independent Sixth Form of d'Overbroeck's College is housed in both the Swan Building at 111 and the adjacent number 113 which was, by the turn of the 20th century, occupied by a Mr R. Lamb Abbott MA who advertised for students to take instruction in "a course of lectures" over four weeks or so to enable them to sit their responsions and thus matriculate at the university.

Wychwood School, an independent girls' school, is at 74 Banbury Road. Established in 1897 as Miss Batty's School for the daughters of Oxford dons, from 1898 to 1907, the school was housed at 77 Banbury Road – a "charming Regency house" – where residents Miss A.S. Batty and Miss Margaret Lee MA taught a handful of day girls. Miss Lee would later acquire ownership of number 77. The school at that time also provided accommodation for young women sitting examinations who were members of the Society of Oxford Home Students – later St Anne's College, Oxford where Miss Lee tutored from 1913 to 1936. 77 Banbury Road was religious in nature: Miss Batty had an academic interest in religious matters and Miss Lee was the granddaughter of an Anglican vicar.

Banbury Road Medical Centre is a National Health Service facility at 172 Banbury Road.

BBC Oxford is also based on Banbury Road and is home to the local televised news output and BBC Radio Oxford. In early 1970 the BBC Oxford studios were actually located further down at 242–254 Banbury Road (now a branch of Marks & Spencer), but were later moved to 269 in 1989 as local media services within BBC Oxford expanded.

== People ==
Famous residents include the lexicographer James Murray who produced the first Oxford English Dictionary (a blue plaque now marks the site) and the zoologist Desmond Morris, author of The Naked Ape.

The artist Paul Nash (1889–1946) lived at 106 Banbury Road, marked with an Oxfordshire Blue Plaque.

Jesse Elliston, the proprietor of what became Oxford's leading department store, Elliston & Cavell, died in the Banbury Road in 1853 at the age of only 47.

Dame Honor Fell DBE, FRS (1900–1986) studied at Wychwood School and this is commemorated with a blue plaque from the Society of Biology, installed in 2015.

Christopher Strachey (1916–1975) founded and led the Programming Research Group (part of Oxford University) from 1965 until his untimely death, at 45 Banbury Road. From 1977, the PRG was then led by Tony Hoare, located here until 1984.

== In popular culture ==
Barbara Pym's 1985 comic novel "Crampton Hodnet" is set in an old Victorian house in Banbury Road, North Oxford.

== Adjoining roads in North Oxford ==
- Bardwell Road
- Beech Croft Road
- Belbroughton Road
- Bevington Road
- Canterbury Road
- Five Mile Drive
- Keble Road
- Lathbury Road
- Linton Road
- Lonsdale Road
- Marston Ferry Road
- Moreton Road
- Norham Gardens
- Norham Road
- North Parade
- Park Town
- Parks Road
- Rawlinson Road
- South Parade
- Staverton Road
- St Giles'
- St Margaret's Road
- Victoria Road
- Woodstock Road

== Gallery ==
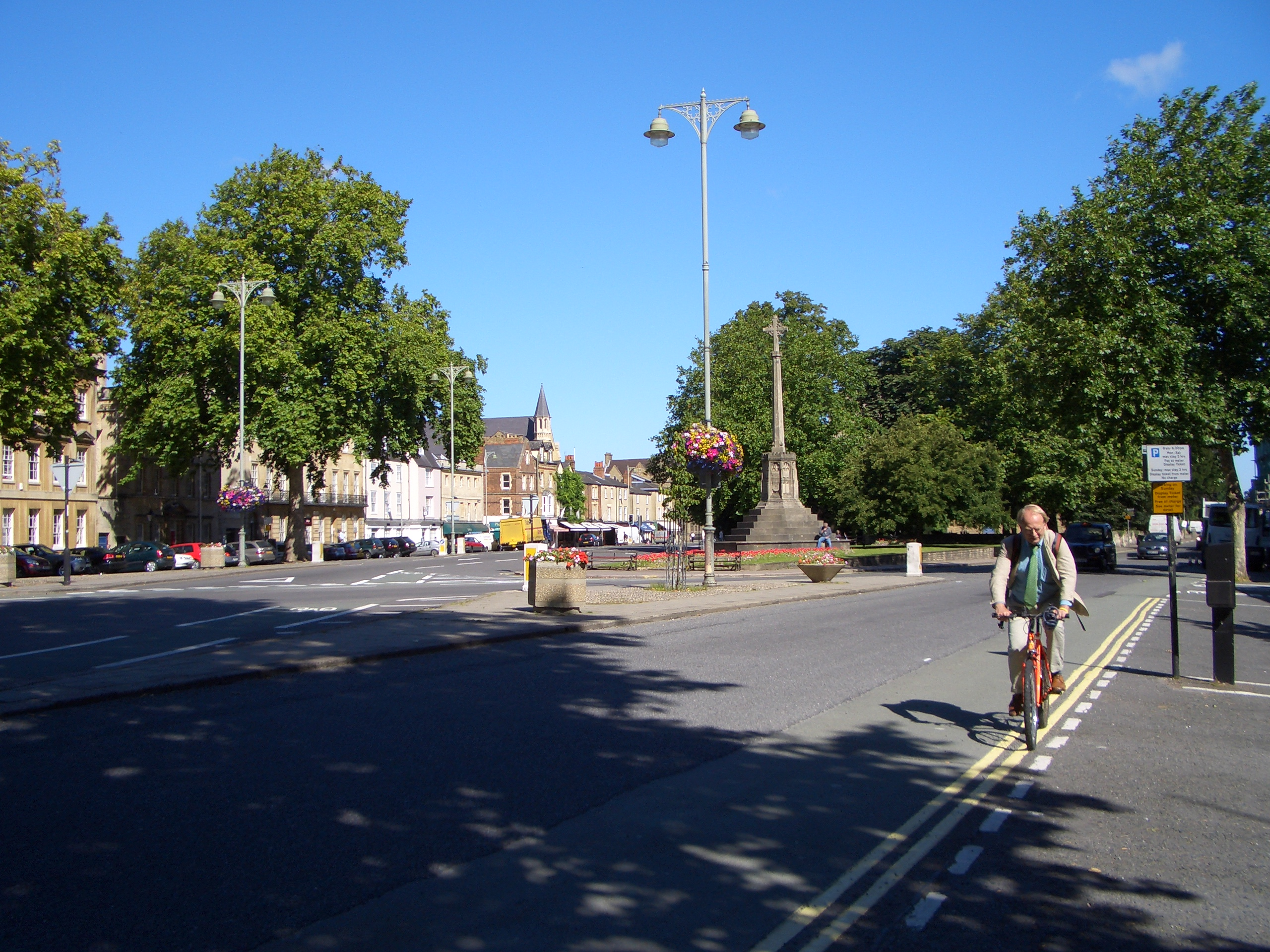
The southern end of Banbury Road (right) and Woodstock Road (left) from the north end of St Giles'.

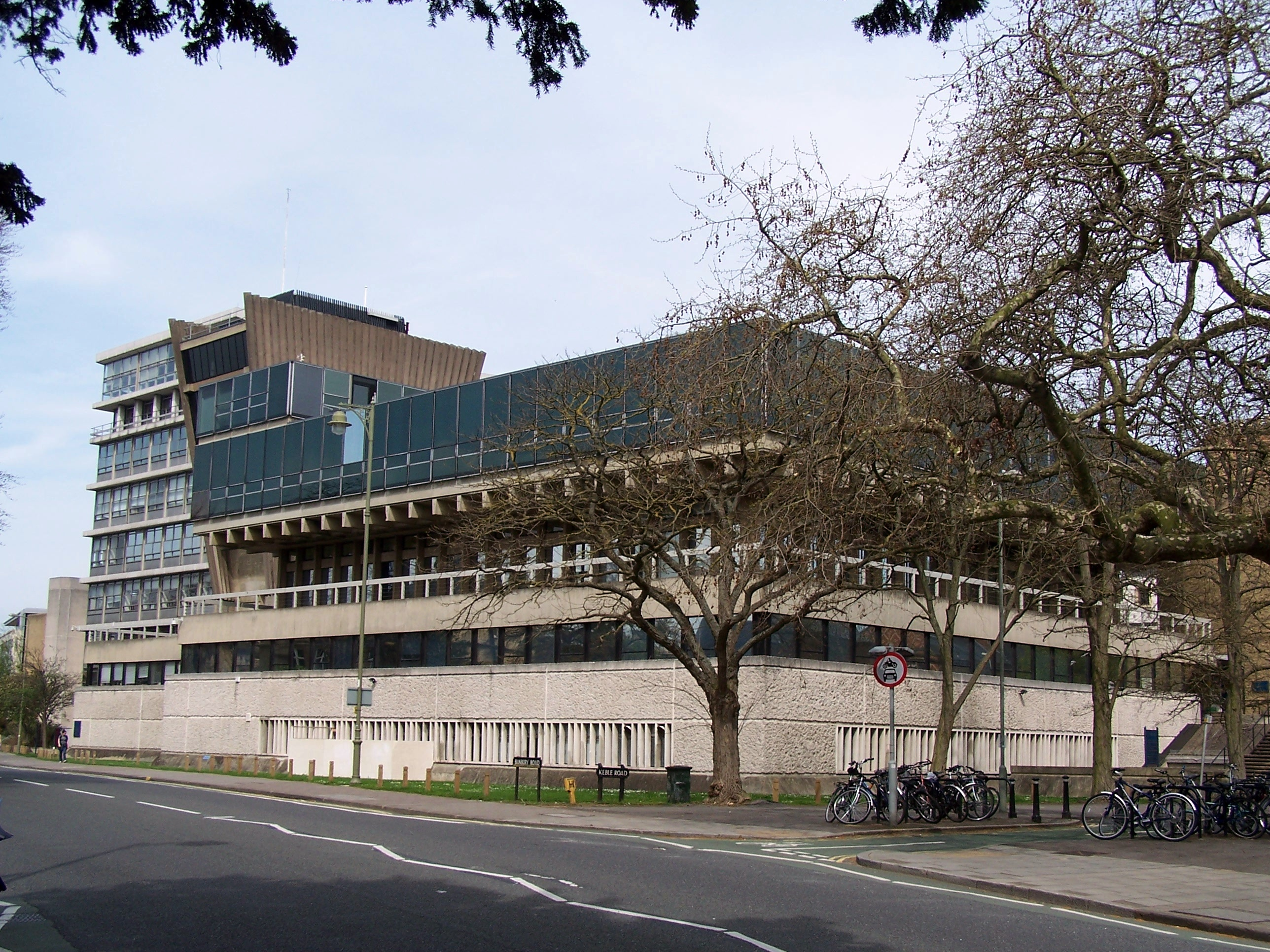
The Denys Wilkinson Building from the Banbury Road on the corner with Keble Road, looking north with the Thom Building in the background.

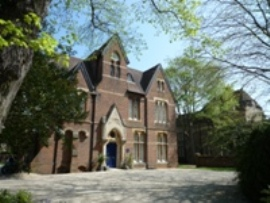
Kellogg College at 62 Banbury Road.

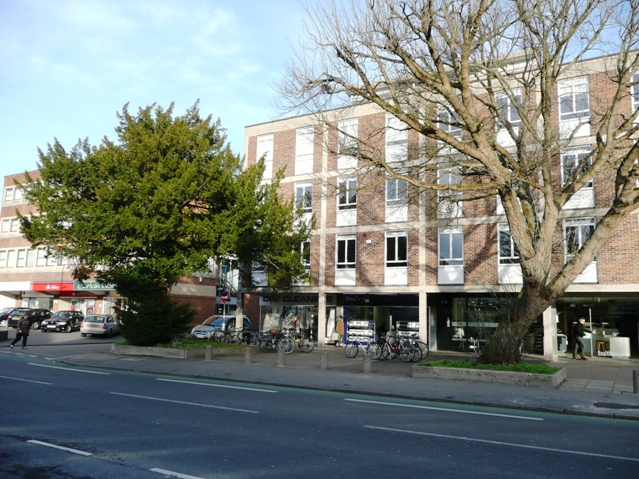
Offices on Banbury Road in Summertown.

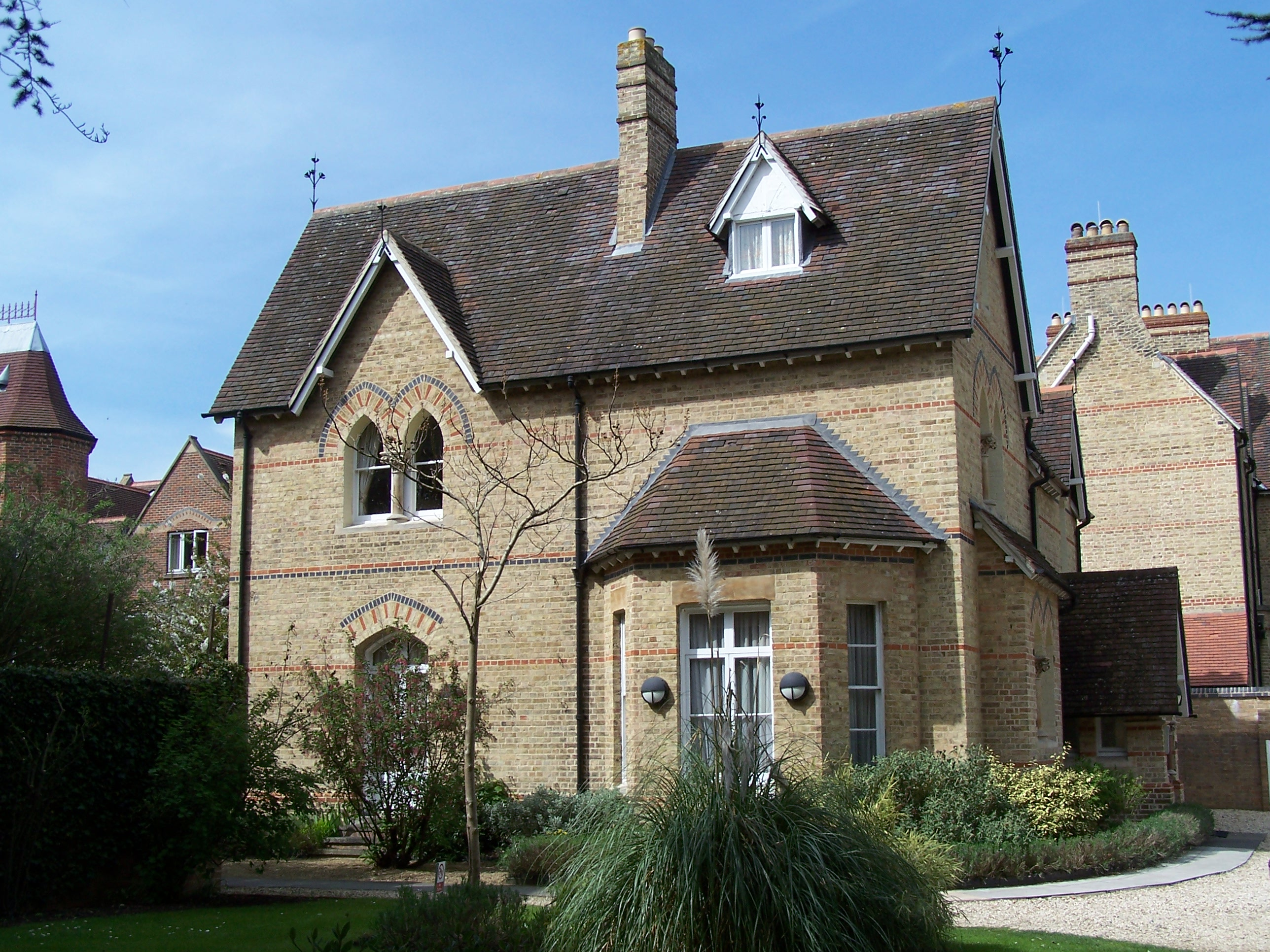
37 Banbury Road, St Anne's College, a typical Gothic North Oxford house, designed by Frederick Codd in 1866.

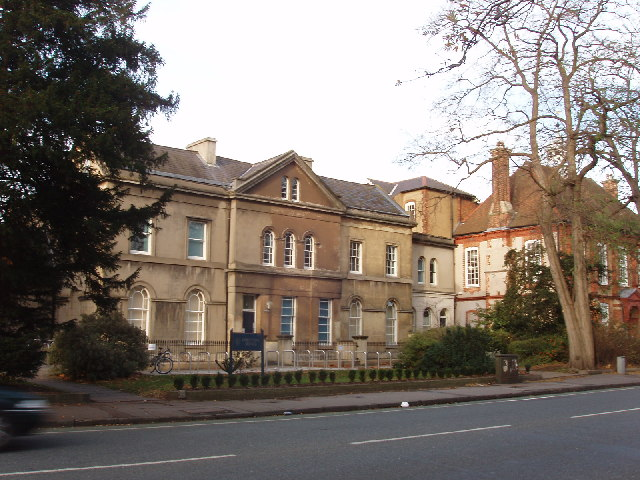
Oxford University Computing Services building on Banbury Road.

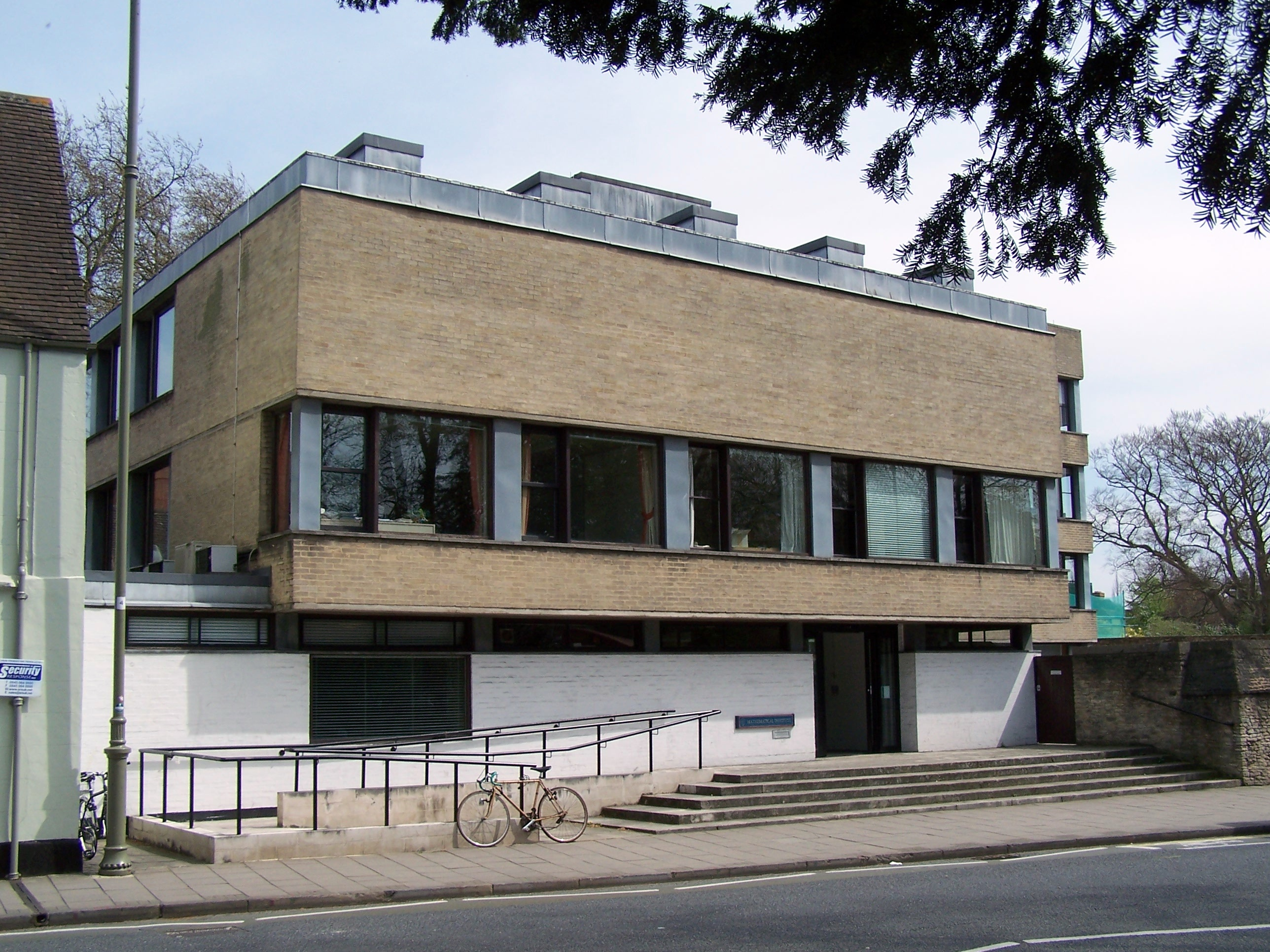
The former Mathematical Institute, near the southern end of Banbury Road.

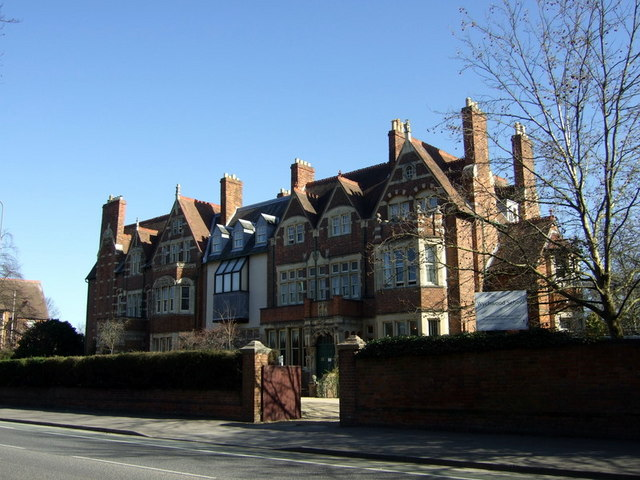
Wychwood School for Girls at 74 Banbury Road.

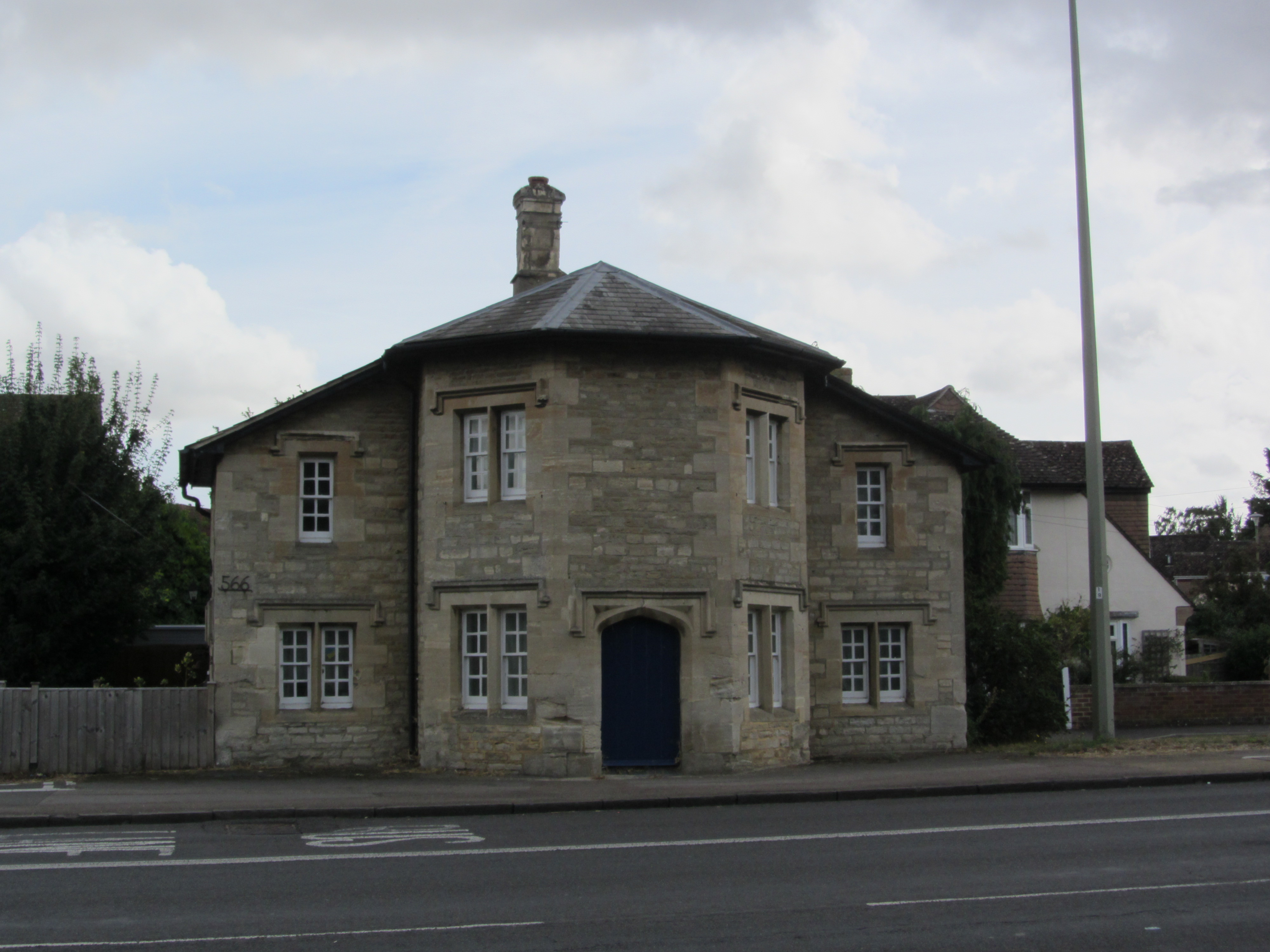
Grade II listed former Tollhouse at 566 Banbury Road.

== See also ==
- Acland Hospital
- Norham Manor estate

== Bibliography ==
- Hinchcliffe, Tanis, North Oxford. New Haven & London: Yale University Press, 1992. ISBN 0-300-05184-0.
