= Cavell (name) =

Cavell was originally the name of a township in East Riding of Yorkshire. The name is first attested in an charter of 959 (surviving in a twelfth-century copy) as Cafeld, and in the Domesday Book of 1086 as Cheuede. The first part of the name derives from the Old English word cā ("jackdaw") and the second from Old English feld ("field, open ground"). Thus the place-name once meant "jackdaw field". The Pipe Rolls record one Thomas de Kauill in 1190 living in Yorkshire. Robert de Cavilla appears in the Hundred Rolls of Lincolnshire the following century. By the early modern period the name was also spelt Cavell and Cavill.

Notable people with the name include:

== Given name ==
- Cavell Brownie, American statistician
- Gordon Cavell Johnson (born 1985), known professionally as Cavell Johnson, American basketball player and coach

== Surname ==
- Edith Cavell (1865–1915), British First-World-War nurse, Anglican saint
- Humphrey Cavell, 16th-century Member of Parliament
- John Cavell (1813–1887), British department store proprietor and mayor of Oxford, England
- John Cavell (bishop) (1916–2017), British Anglican cleric, Bishop of Southampton
- Kingsley Cavell (born 1953), British chemist, professor of inorganic chemistry and head of the school of chemistry at Cardiff University
- Marc Cavell (actor) (1939–2004), American actor
- Marc Cavell (artist) (1911–1989), British kinetic artist
- Stanley Cavell (1926–2018), American writer and philosopher

== Fictional characters ==
- Mark Cavell, in The Man from the Alamo

== See also ==
- Cavell (disambiguation)
