= Cavill =

Cavill may refer to:

== People ==
- Cavill family, Australian family known for its contributions to the sport of swimming
- Cavill Heugh (born 1962), Australian rugby footballer
- Henry Cavill (born 1983), British actor and model
- Jim Cavill (c. 1862–1952), Australian hotelier
- Joy Cavill (1923–1990), Australian writer and producer

== Other ==
- Cavill Avenue, a street in Surfers Paradise, Queensland, Australia
- Circle on Cavill, a $551 million commercial development, built by the Sunland Group

== See also ==
- Cavell (name), a related surname
- Cavell (disambiguation)
