= Jesse Elliston =

British businessman (1806–1853)

Jesse Elliston (3 March 1806 – 26 July 1853) was a proprietor of Elliston & Cavell, which became the leading department store in Oxford, England.

Elliston was born in Ipswich, Suffolk, to James and Mary Ann Elliston. He was baptised a Baptist. He owned a draper's shop in central Oxford when his sister, Sarah Elliston of Summertown in north Oxford, married John Cavell on 9 April 1835. As a result, Elliston made Cavell a partner of the shop, which then became known as Elliston & Cavell. It went on to become the largest department store in Oxford for many years, until its eventual conversion to a Debenhams store.

In 1853, after feeling unwell for a week, the 47-year-old Elliston collapsed and died suddenly while walking in the Banbury Road on his way to Summertown. Cavell subsequently took over the running of the shop.
