= Shopping parade =

Group of shops in a suburban neighbourhood

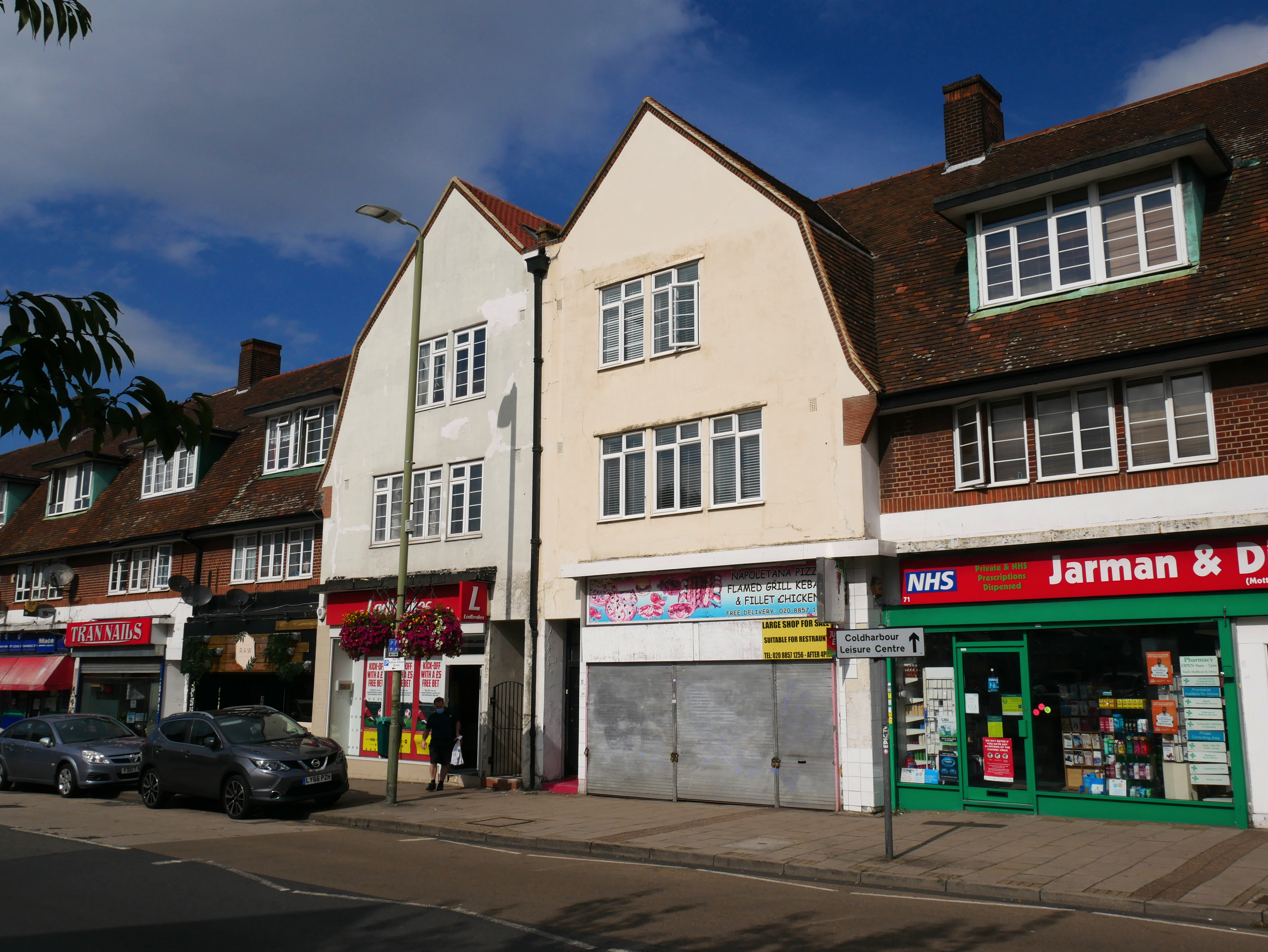
A parade of shops in Mottingham

A shopping parade, also known as a parade of shops, suburban parade, neighbourhood parade, or simply a parade is a group of between five and 40 shops in one or more continuous rows, mostly being retail and serving a local customer base; in general many of these shops are independent and locally owned. The word parade applied to a row of shops dates back to the late 18th century in England, and originally referred to a terraced row with the shops on the ground floor (metaphorically lined up on parade) and the owners living above, but was extended to cover rows of shops in more fashionable districts.

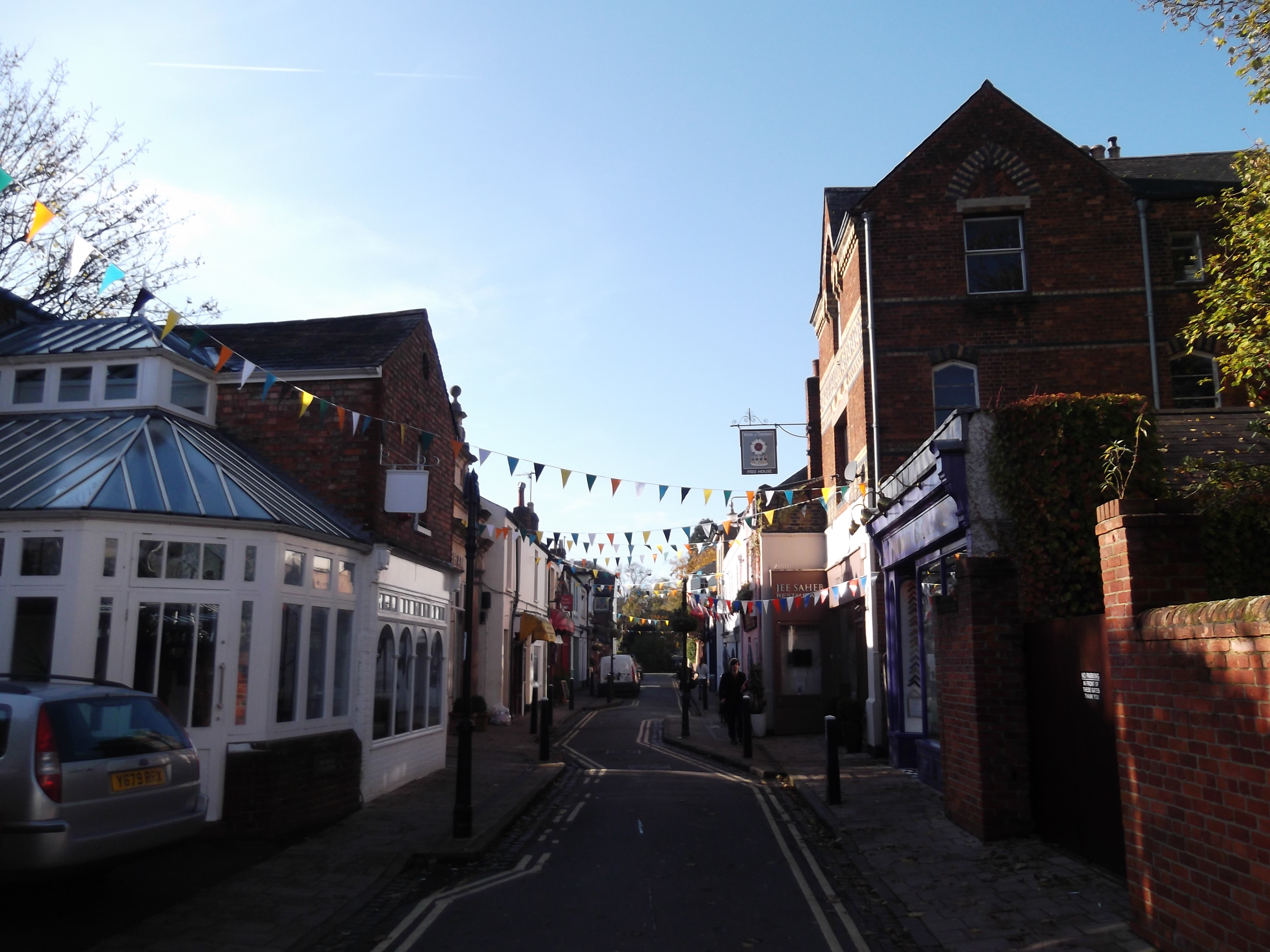
North Parade in Oxford

== See also ==
- Neighborhood shopping centre
- Shopping mall
