= John Cavell =

British politician

John Caldicott Cavell (12 January 1813 – 5 February 1887) was a department store proprietor and mayor of Oxford, England.

John Cavell was born in Bardwell, Suffolk, the son of Charles and Sarah Cavell, He married Sarah Elliston of Summertown, Oxford on 9 April 1835, at the age of 22. She was the sister of Jesse Elliston, who owned a draper's shop in central Oxford. Elliston made John Cavell a partner and the shop became known as Elliston & Cavell. This went on to become the largest department store in Oxford.

== Mayor of Oxford ==
Cavell became a city councillor in 1860 and an Alderman in 1868. He was also Mayor of Oxford in 1865–6, 1877–8 and briefly in 1879–80.

Cavell's funeral took place at St Mary Magdalen Church on 10 February 1887. It was attended by 1,500–2,000 mourners. He was buried in St Sepulchre's Cemetery off Walton Street.
