= Woodstock Road, Oxford =

Road in Oxford, England

Coordinates: 51.78335°N 1.27527°W

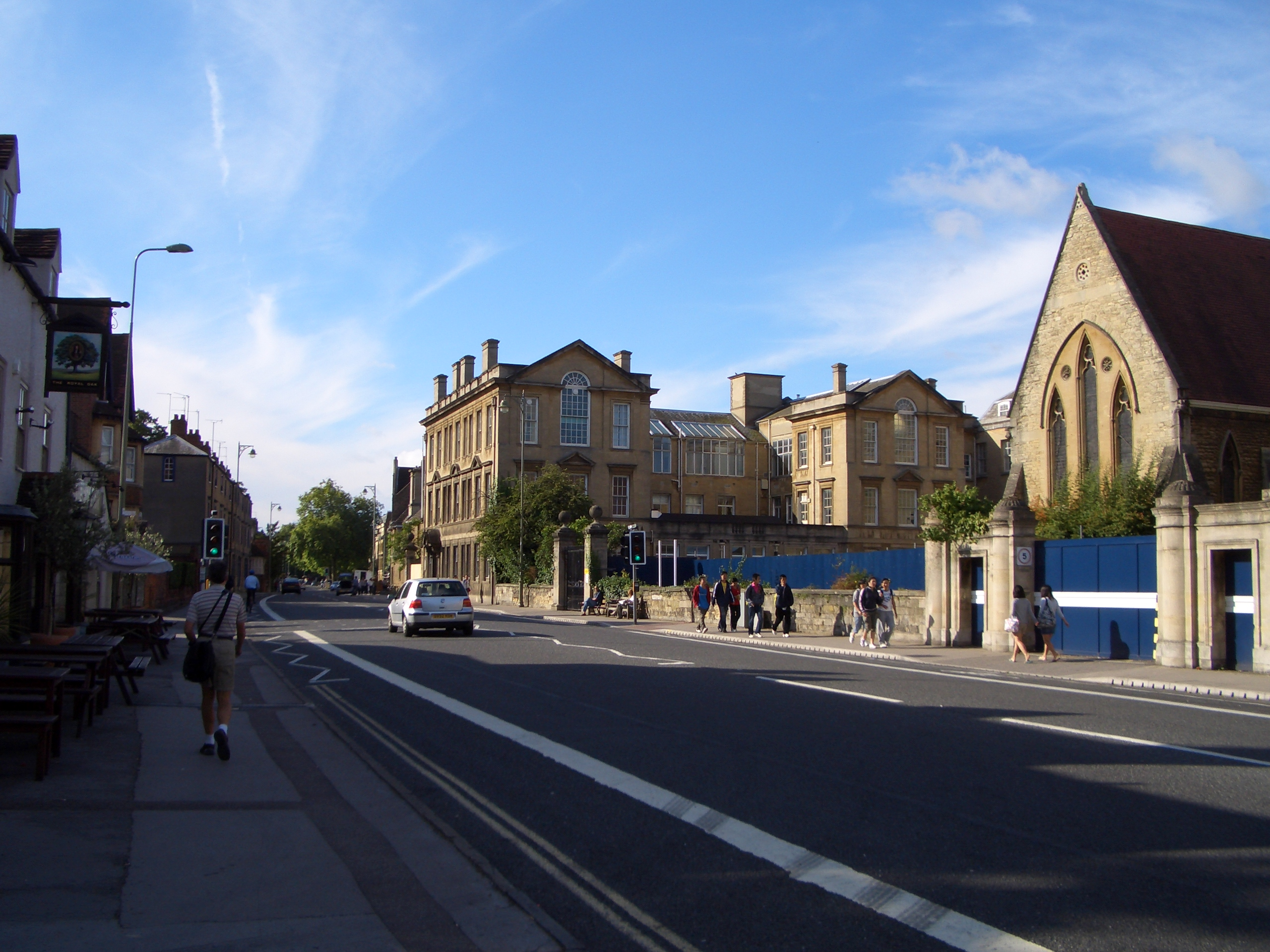
Woodstock Road, looking south near the former Radcliffe Infirmary.

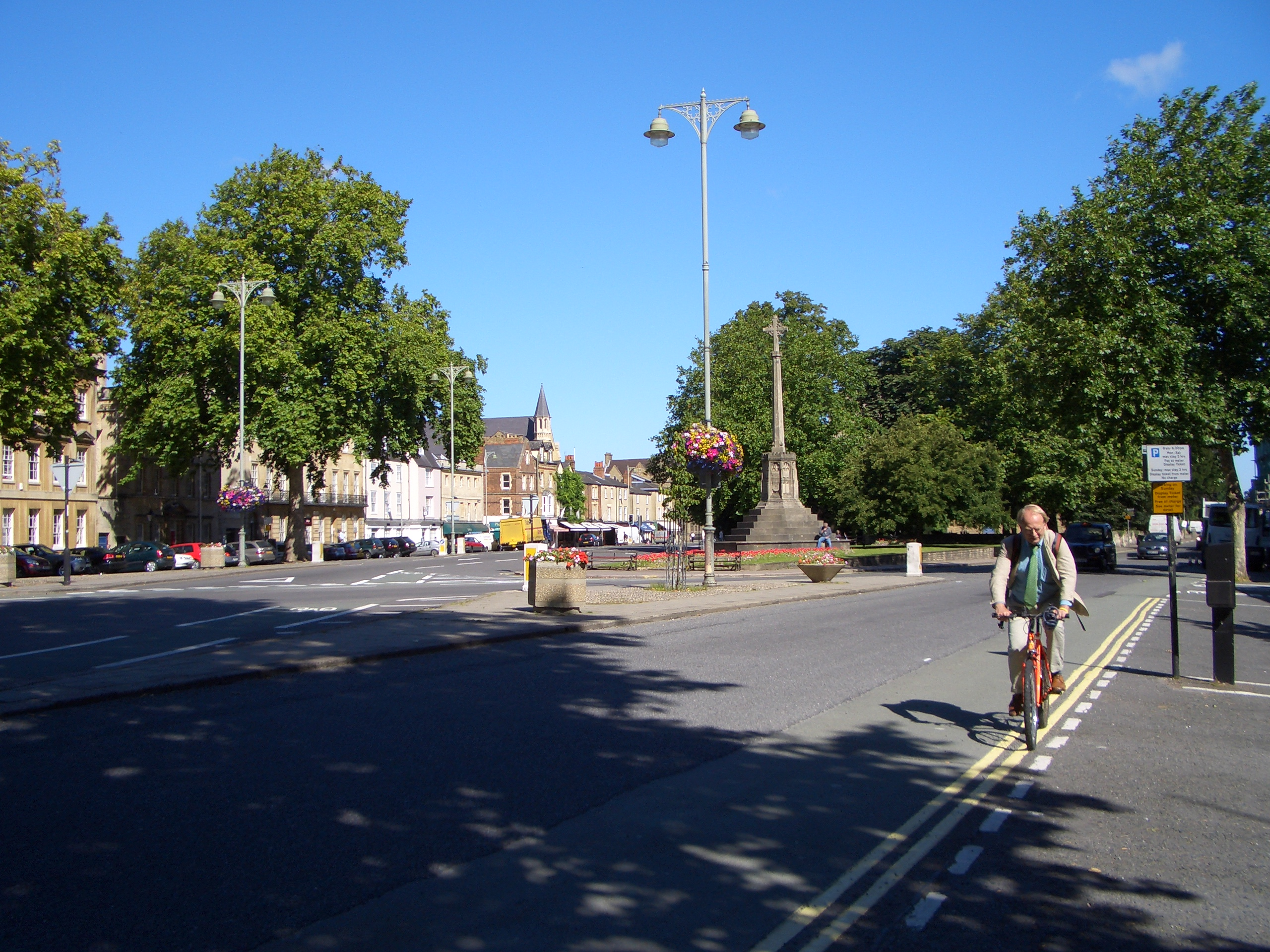
The southern end of Woodstock Road (left) Banbury Road (right) from the north end of St Giles'.

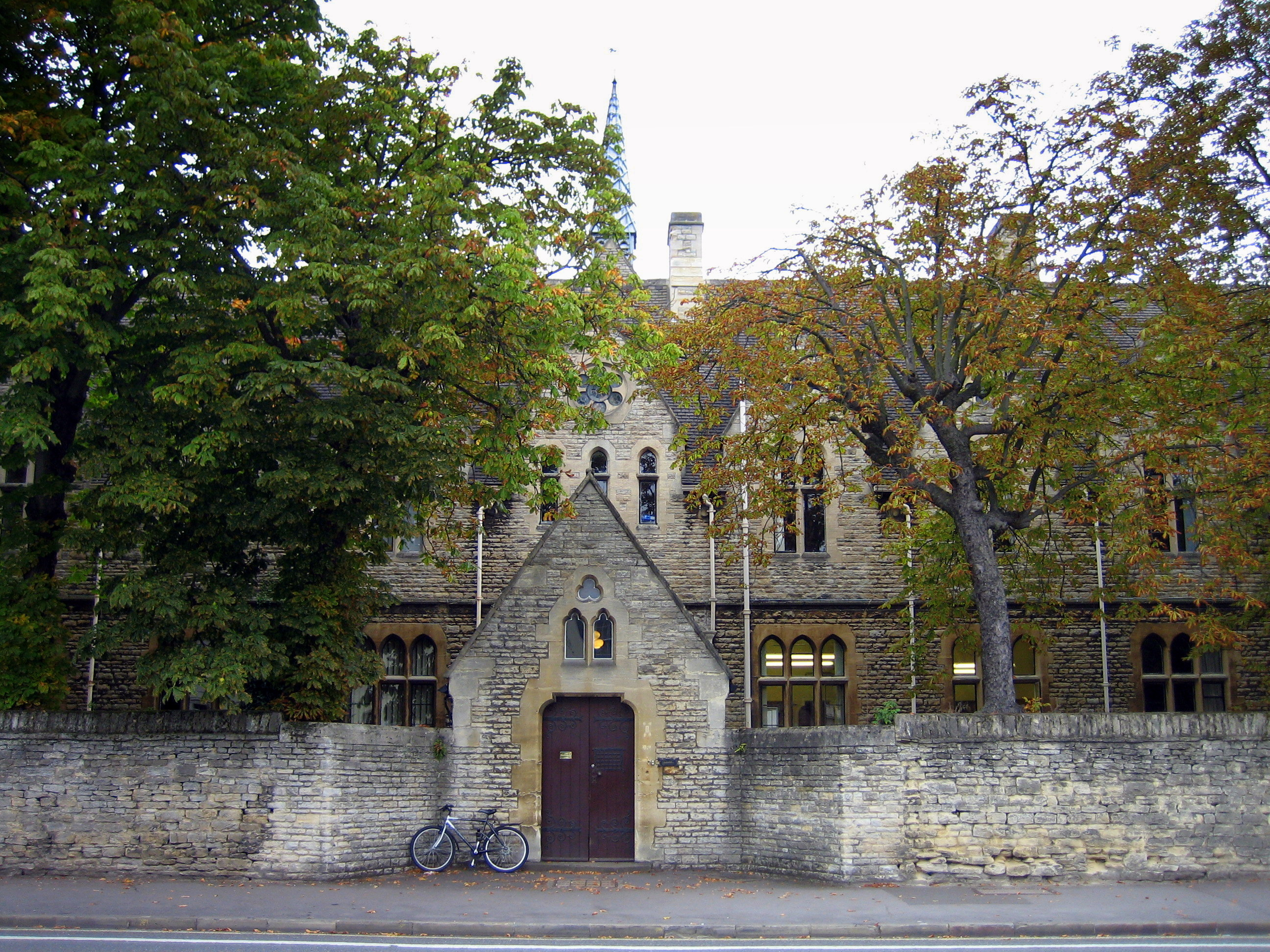
St Antony's College on the Woodstock Road.

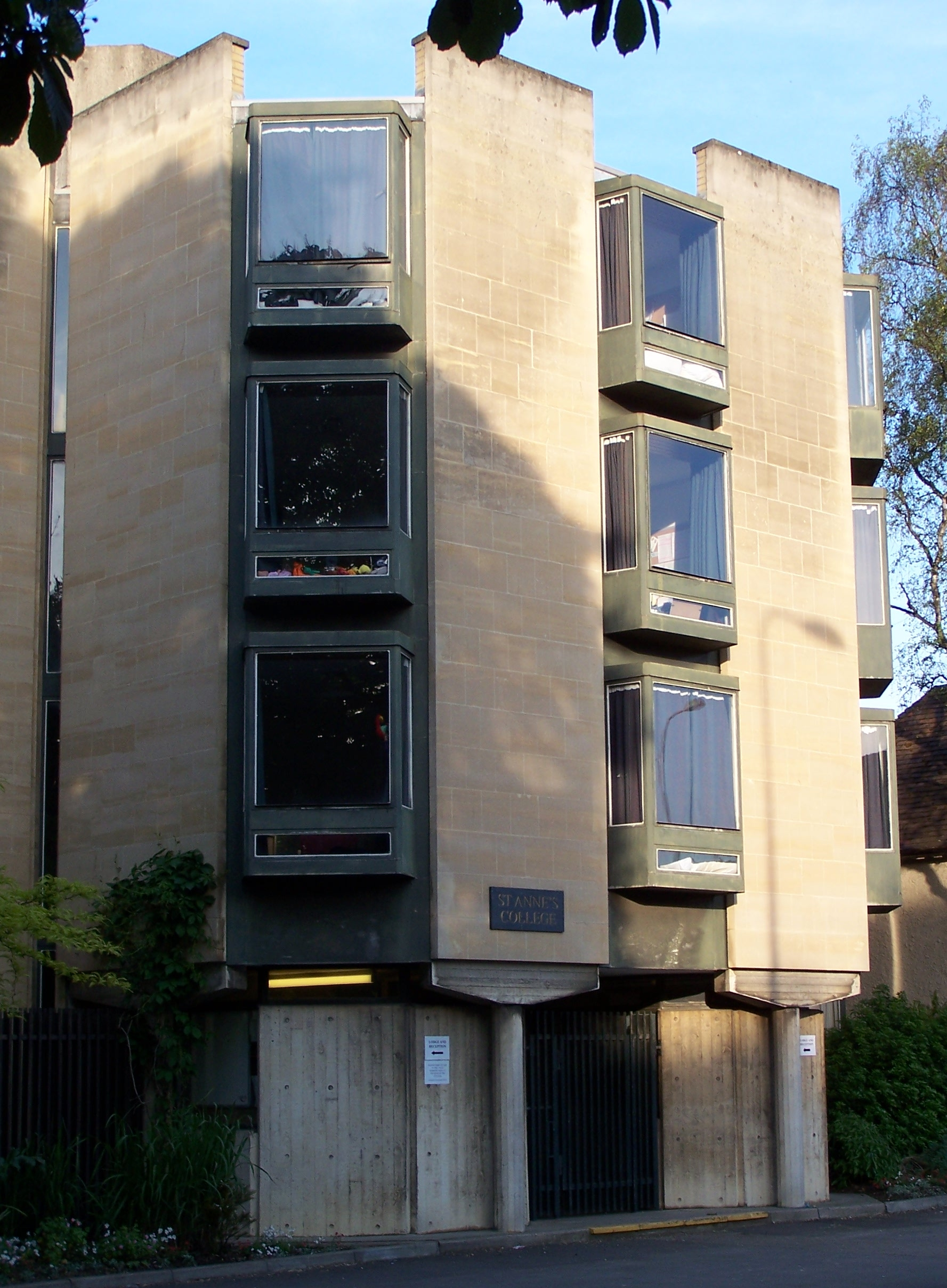
The Gatehouse (demolished 2014) of St Anne's College, formerly the entrance to the college, on Woodstock Road.

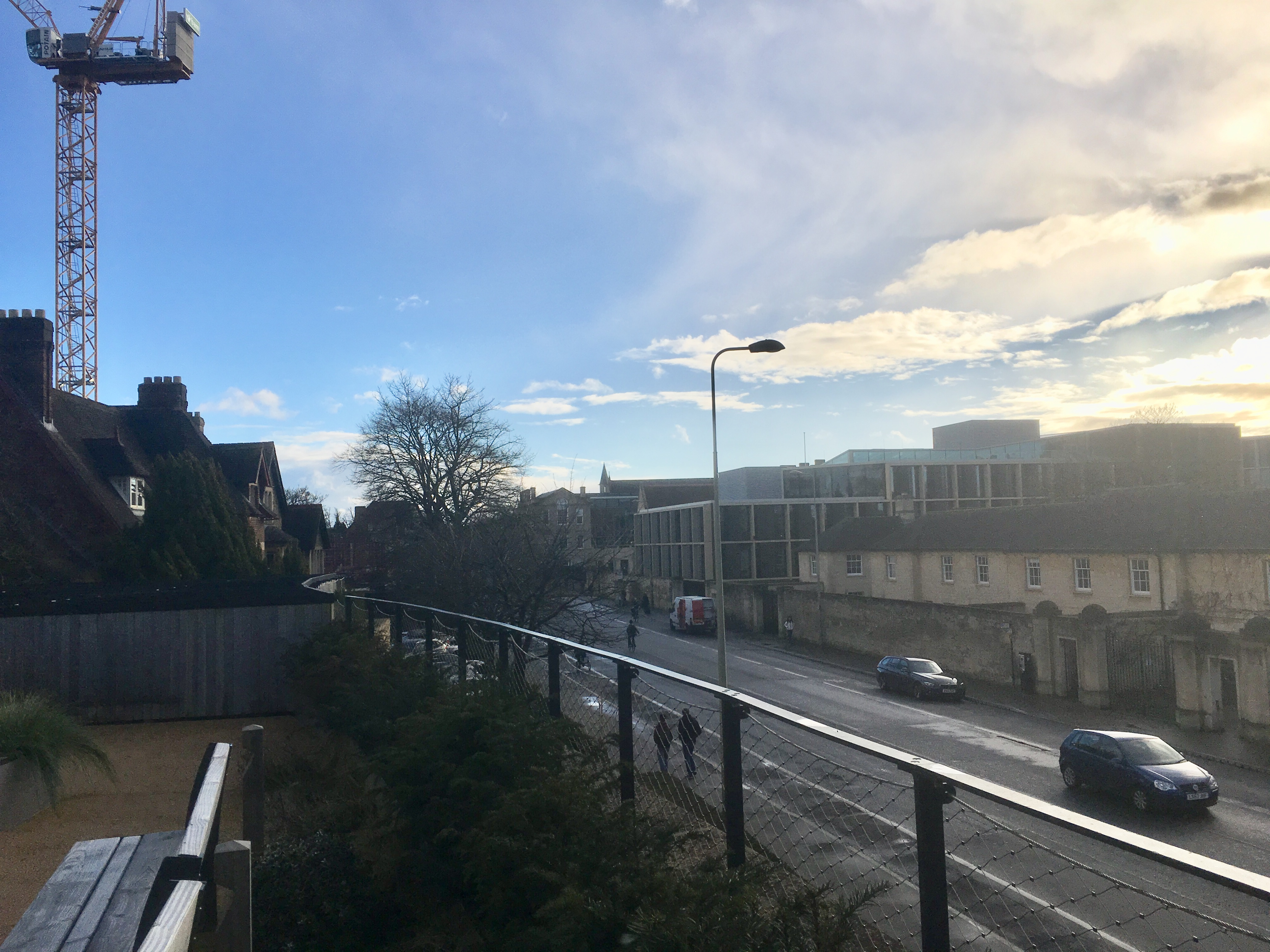
The Andrew Wiles Building on Woodstock Road, viewed from St Anne's College

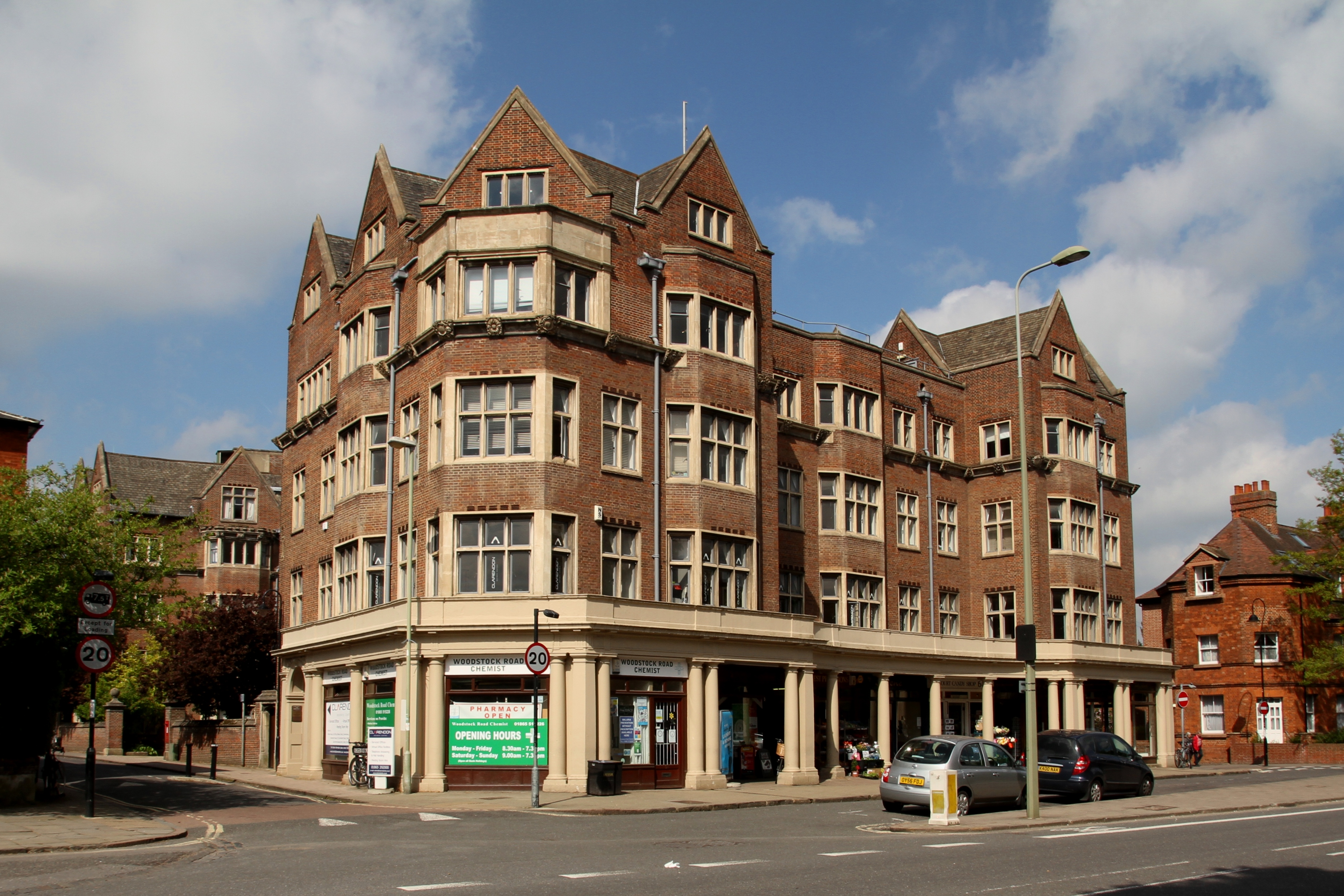
Belsyre Court, a 1936 Grade II listed apartment block, on Woodstock Road.

Woodstock Road is a major road in Oxford, England, running from St Giles' in the south, north towards Woodstock through the leafy suburb of North Oxford. To the east is Banbury Road, which it meets at the junction with St Giles'.

== Buildings ==
At the southern end, just north of Little Clarendon Street, are the Oratory Church of St Aloysius Gonzaga and Somerville College. Opposite Little Clarendon Street is St Giles' Church, built in 1120 and consecrated in 1200. Further north are Green Templeton College, St Anne's College and St Antony's College. Also on Woodstock Road is St Philip and St James Church, now the Oxford Centre for Mission Studies (OCMS) and St. Edward's School which is a prominent feature halfway down. Woodstock Road Baptist Church is an evangelical church on the corner with Beech Croft Road. Jack FM and Jack 2, local radio broadcasters covering Oxfordshire, are based at 270 Woodstock Road, along with the local TV channel SIX TV.

The road is classified A4144.

== Notable residents ==
Former residents include:

- Norman Davis (1913–1989), Merton Professor of English Language and Literature at the University of Oxford
- Sir Hugh Elliott (1913–1989), ornithologist
- Lord Redcliffe-Maud (1906–1982), civil servant, diplomat, and Master of University College, Oxford, and Lady Redcliffe-Maud (1904–1993), pianist
- Egon Wellesz (1885–1974), composer and musicologist
- Rowan Atkinson and Richard Curtis, lived together as students
- Dorothy Hodgkin, chemist, awarded a Nobel Prize for advances in protein crystallography, lived at 94 Woodstock Road from 1957 to 1968
- Bill Clinton lived on Leckford Road, just off Woodstock Road, during his time as a student at Oxford.

== Adjoining roads in North Oxford ==
- Banbury Road
- Bainton Road
- Beech Croft Road
- Bevington Road
- Blandford Avenue
- Canterbury Road
- Farndon Road
- Frenchay Road
- Lathbury Road
- Leckford Road
- Little Clarendon Street
- Moreton Road
- Observatory Street
- Plantation Road
- Polstead Road
- Rawlinson Road
- St Bernard's Road
- St Giles' Street, Oxford
- St Margaret's Road
- South Parade
- Staverton Road

== See also ==
- Belsyre Court
- Oxford Oratory
- St Edward's School, Oxford
