= Bevington Road =

Residential road in North Oxford, England

Coordinates: 51.76273°N 1.26189°W

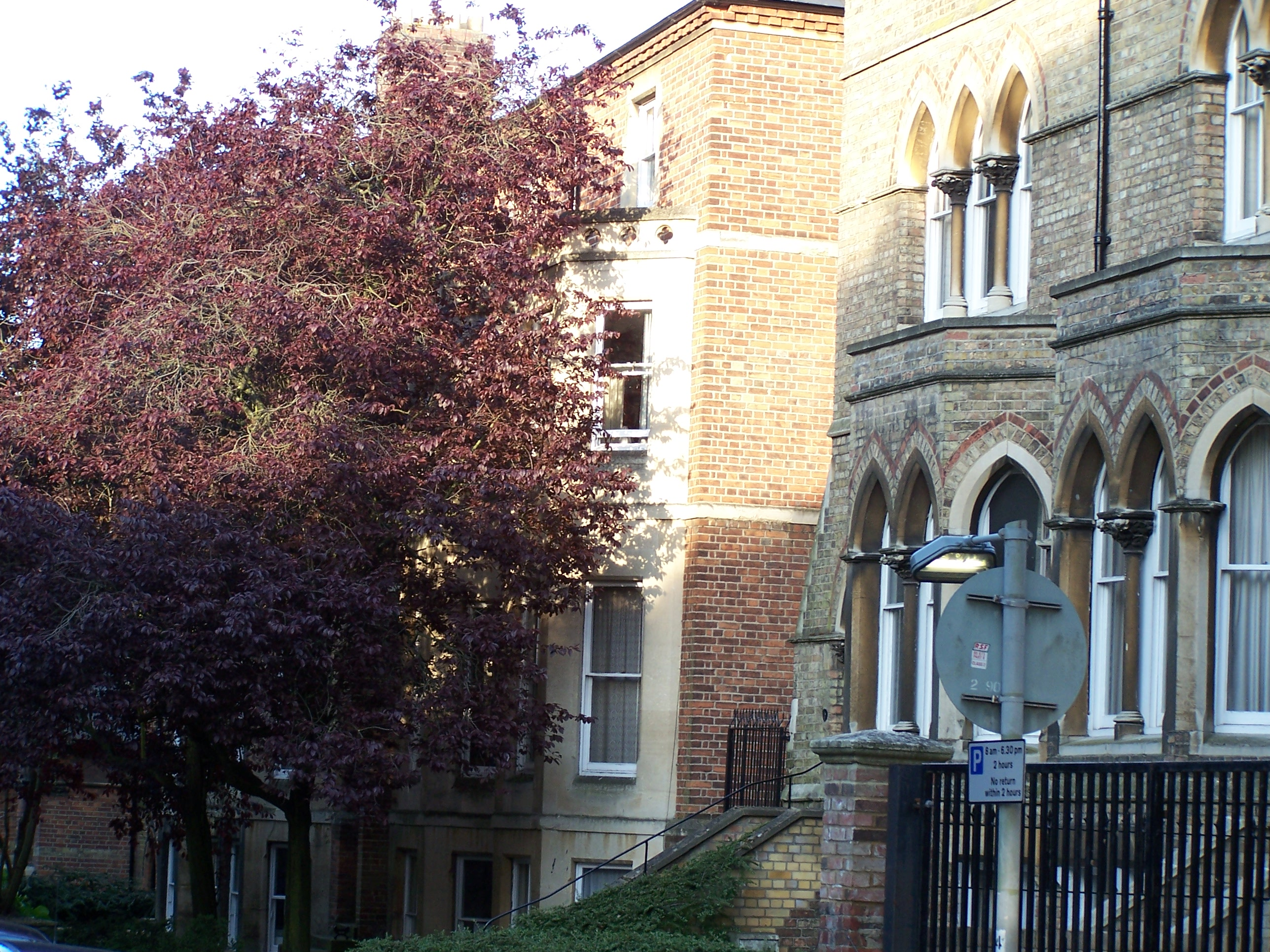
- Houses on the south side of Bevington Road, at the west (Woodstock Road) end
- Former name(s): Horse and Jockey Road
- Length: 0.1 mi (0.16 km)
- Postal code: OX2 6LH
- west end: A4144

- east end: A4165

Bevington Road is a residential road in central North Oxford, England.

The road runs between Woodstock Road (opposite Observatory Street) to the west and Banbury Road to the east. Winchester Road leads north from halfway along Bevington Road. The road was previously known as Horse and Jockey Road. A public house opposite the eastern end of the road on Woodstock Road on the corner with St Bernard's Road, called the Horse and Jockey, was a reminder of this name. In the 1850s there was a plan to run a railway line just to the north of the road, but this never materialised.

The houses are in the traditional North Oxford brick-built Victorian Gothic style and date from 1865 to 1875. Plots on the south side of the road were sold in August 1865 by St John's College, which own much of the land in the area. Architects of the houses include Frederick Codd and William Wilkinson.

To the south is St Anne's College, one of the former women's colleges of the University of Oxford, fronting onto Woodstock Road and backing onto Banbury Road. All of the properties fronting onto the south side of Bevington Road are property of St Anne's College, and most are used for undergraduate accommodation. St Anne's College began a regeneration project for the college-owned houses in July 2023.

To the north is St Antony's College, a graduate college of the University, between Woodstock Road and Winchester Road.

The Animal Behaviour Research Group of Oxford University, begun in 1949 on the arrival in Oxford of Niko Tinbergen, was located at 13 Bevington Road from 1961 to 1971. Prominent members of the group included Richard Dawkins and Desmond Morris. Dawkins conducted programming experiments on an early PDP-8 mini-computer here.

The road is one-way to traffic from Banbury Road to Woodstock Road.

== Gallery ==
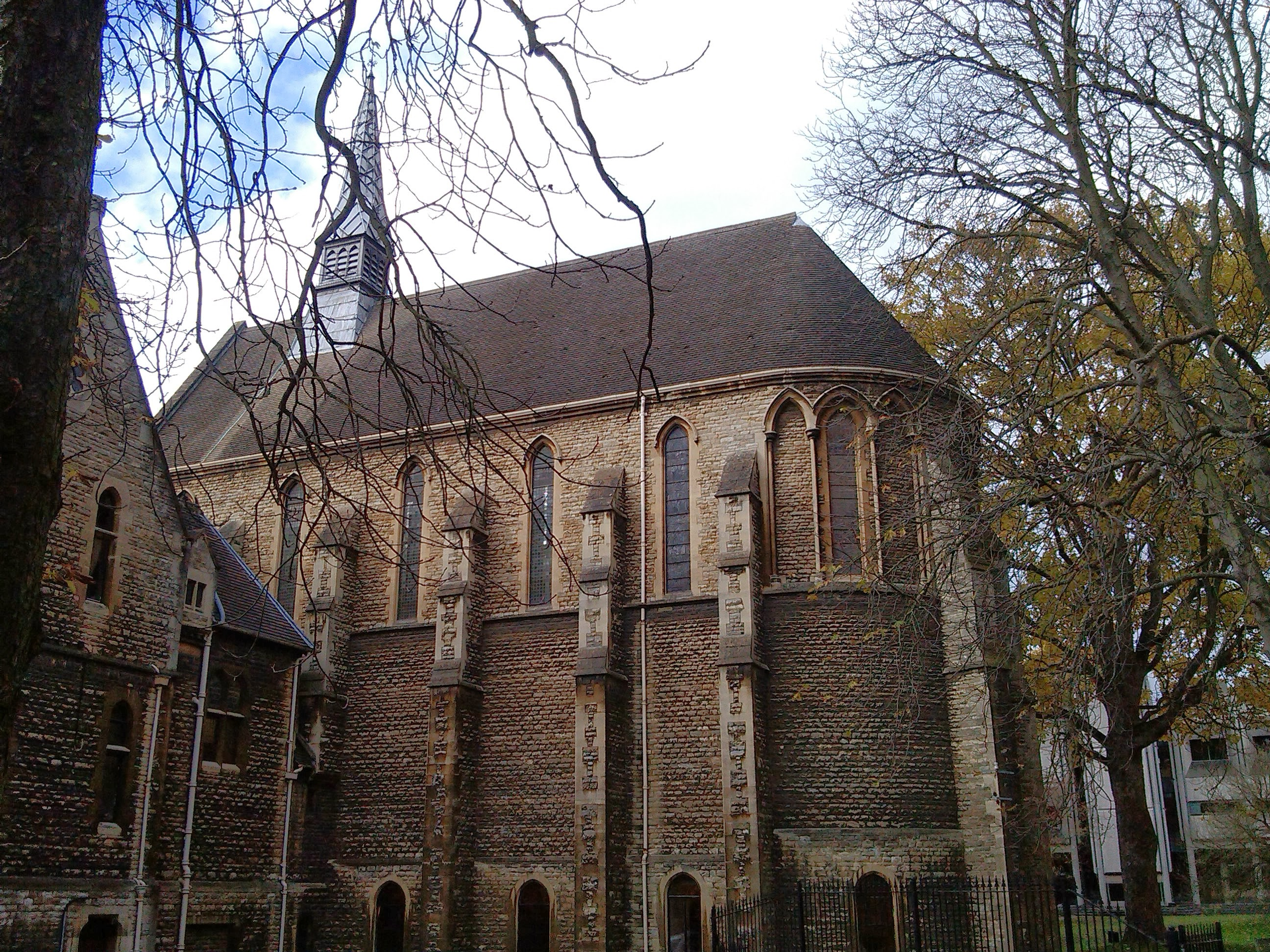
The chapel of St Antony's College on the north side of Bevington Road

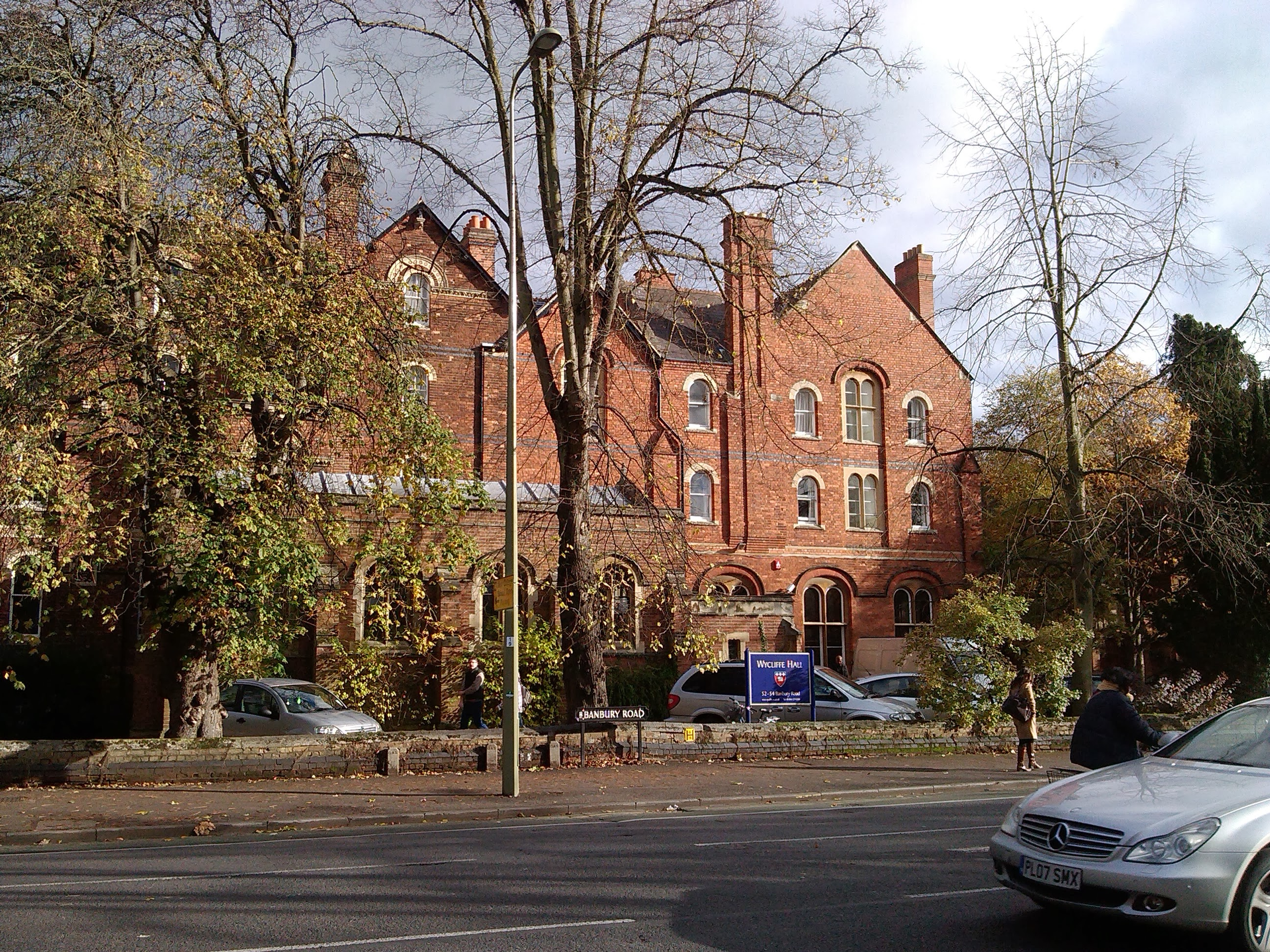
Wycliffe Hall viewed from the east end of Bevington Road

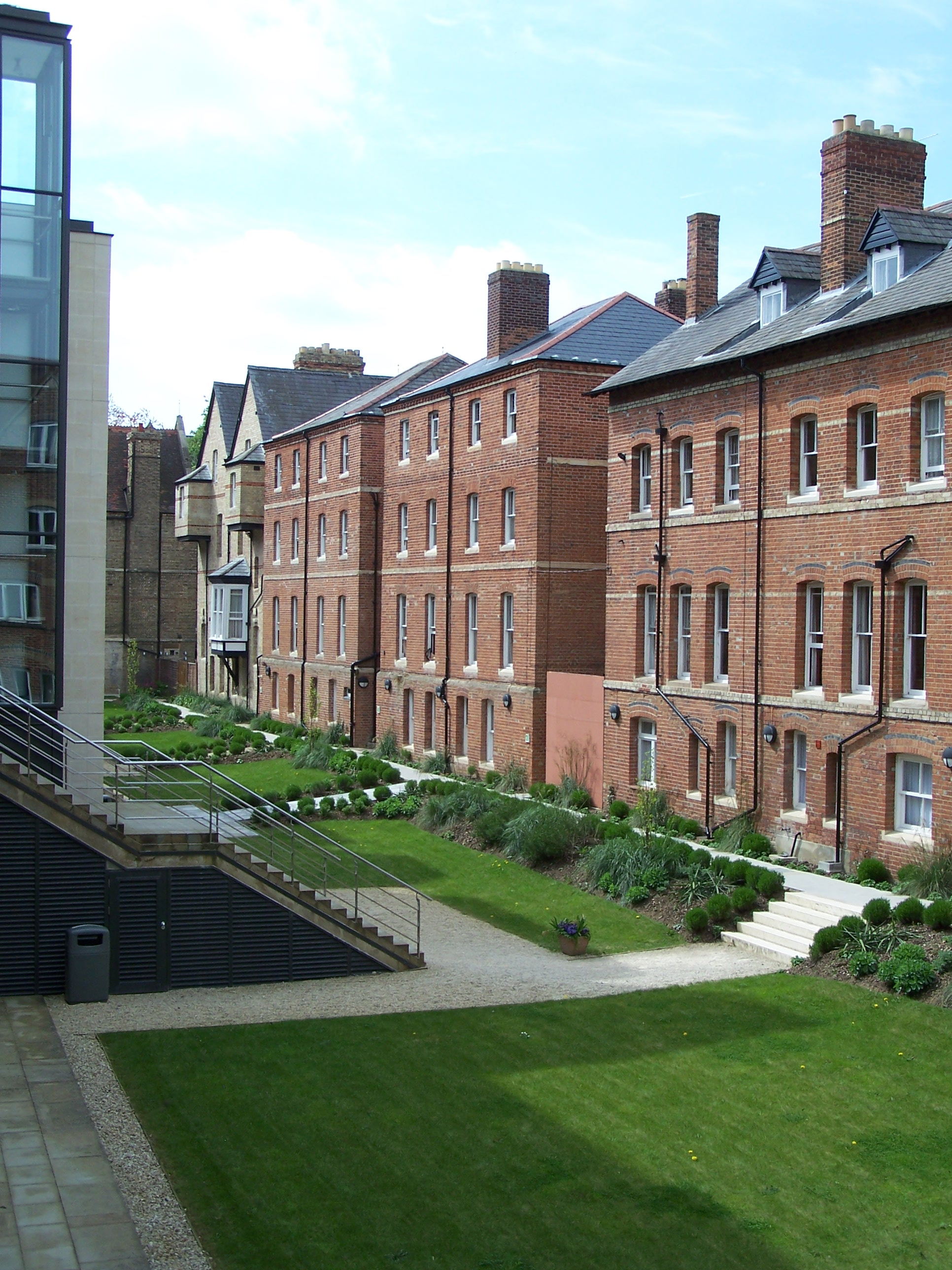
The rear of the houses on the south side of Bevington Road in St Anne's College
