= Cavell Creek =

Stream in Alberta, Canada

Coordinates: 52.70583°N 118.06526°W

Cavell Creek is a stream in Alberta, Canada.

It has the name of Edith Cavell, an English nurse.

== See also ==
- List of rivers of Alberta
