= Responsions =

Former examination at Oxford University

Responsions was the first of the three examinations formerly required for acceptance for an academic degree at the University of Oxford. It was nicknamed Little Go or Smalls and was normally taken by students prior to or shortly after matriculation, on the basis that without standardised qualifications from school examinations, the university had to verify for itself the quality of the students that colleges were accepting. The examination consisted of comparatively simple questions on Latin, Ancient Greek, and mathematics. It was abolished in 1960.

John Henry Newman wrote to his father on 29 May 1818: "I go up for my Little tomorrow", and records in his journal for the following day that he had 'passed Responsions'.

P. G. Wodehouse in The Inimitable Jeeves wrote: "Well, they're down there, too, reading for some exam or other with the vicar. I used to read with him myself at one time. He's known far and wide as a pretty hot coach for those of fairly feeble intellect. Well, when I tell you he got me through Smalls, you'll gather that he's a bit of a hummer. I call this most extraordinary."

Responsions derives from Anglo-French responsion from Latin responsio "a reply or an answer", from the Latin verb respondeo, to answer, or give a response.

== Similar examinations ==
=== University of Cambridge ===
The equivalent at Cambridge to Responsions at Oxford was the Previous Examination, so called because it was taken a year previous to graduation; it was often called the 'Little Go'. Says one writer of the Cambridge 'Little Go':

"Latin Responsions was a requirement for entry, School Certificate and the GCE Latin allowing exemption. However, in the early 1950s several bright students had to go to Cambridge to take it because the then Labour Government decreed that those under 16 could only take GCE as a non-candidate and so deprived them of the certificate. It presumably died when the Latin requirement was dropped in the 1960s."

Brewer (1894) defines Little Go as: "The examination held in the Cambridge University in the second year of residence. Called also "the previous examination", because it precedes by a year the examination for a degree. In Oxford the corresponding examination is called The Smalls."

However the 1996 edition of Brewer gives: "A nickname for the former Previous (Entrance) Examination for undergraduates at Cambridge, unless excused on account of successes at other examinations. It ceased to operate after 1961, owing to new regulations."

Other sources also suggest that at some point the Little-Go came to refer to the entrance examination.

Karl Pearson's obituary of Raphael Weldon (p. 8) refers to Weldon "preparing (c. 1877) for Little-Go and the London Preliminary Scientific. For the classical part of the former he seems to have worked by himself." Pearson also refers to 'Little-Go' in Cambridge in 1842 in his biography of Francis Galton. Taking the examination was called 'having a little go' and the counterpart of taking Part II examinations (final year) was 'having a great go'. Both are not now used.

=== Trinity College Dublin ===
The Final Freshman examination at Trinity College Dublin was also termed 'Little-go', which all students whether Honours or Pass had to pass till 1959 if they were to rise to Sophister standing. The ordinary undergraduate course in Arts itself (along with the Little Go examination) was abolished in 1979.

In an RTE interview filmed in 1966, the Anglo-Irish author, film director, composer, celebrity and former Spitfire pilot Desmond Leslie, explains that he left Trinity College, Dublin in 1941 without graduating because "I though it much easier to join fighter command than to take Little-Go; required less brain".

== Bibliography ==
- Merriam Responsions Websters Dictionary
