= Kingsley Cavell =

Australian chemist

- Born: Kingsley Cavell; 1946 (age 79–80); Melbourne, Australia
- Occupations: retired Professor of Chemistry, professor emeritus
- Spouse: Suzanne Cavell (nee Rose)

Kingsley Cavell is a retired Australian chemist who was professor of inorganic chemistry and head of the School of Chemistry at Cardiff University. His research interests include the design and synthesis of novel heterocyclic carbenes, and functionalised derivatives as ligands in transition metal complexes.
