= Marc Cavell (artist) =

British painter

Marc Cavell (Michael Canter; born 8 November 1911 in England – May 1989 in Paris) was a British painter and kinetic artist.

The work of Marc Cavell is unique in the use of raw materials to create the illusion of movement by multiple sets of lights, transparency effects, and reflections.

Having been influenced by Paul Cézanne, Cavell explored post-cubism methods and experimented with various materials. In 1950, he discovered distinctive artistic possibilities in light and movement.

== Early life and education ==
Cavell was born on 8 November 1911 in England into a Jewish family. Cavell began his studies at the Central School of Arts and Crafts in London. He left England in 1930 to go to Paris, where he joined the Académie Julian and the Académie Ranson.

== Artistic career ==
In 1948, under the tutelage of Albert Gleizes, Cavell participated in artistic research in the workshop of Saint-Rémy-de-Provence. In 1950, he exhibited at Nîmes, the Visconti gallery in Paris, and the Salon des Indépendants, mainly displaying cubist paintings.

Open to other forms of art, on Pablo Picasso's advice he began to work on other surfaces such as textiles and ceramics. During this period, he was commissioned to participate in the decoration of Normandy and the French Embassy in Helsinki.

From 1955 to 1968, he conducted research and experiments on light and movement. His works drew their inspiration from the balance of the formal structures of Futurism.

He died in May 1989 in Paris.
