= North Parade =

Shopping street in North Oxford, England

Coordinates: 51.76472°N 1.26128°W

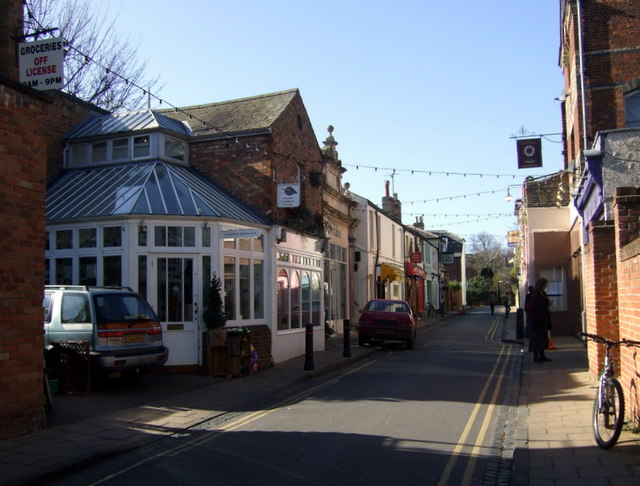
View of the south side of North Parade, looking west from the Banbury Road end towards Winchester Road in the distance. The sign of the Rose & Crown public house can be seen on the right.

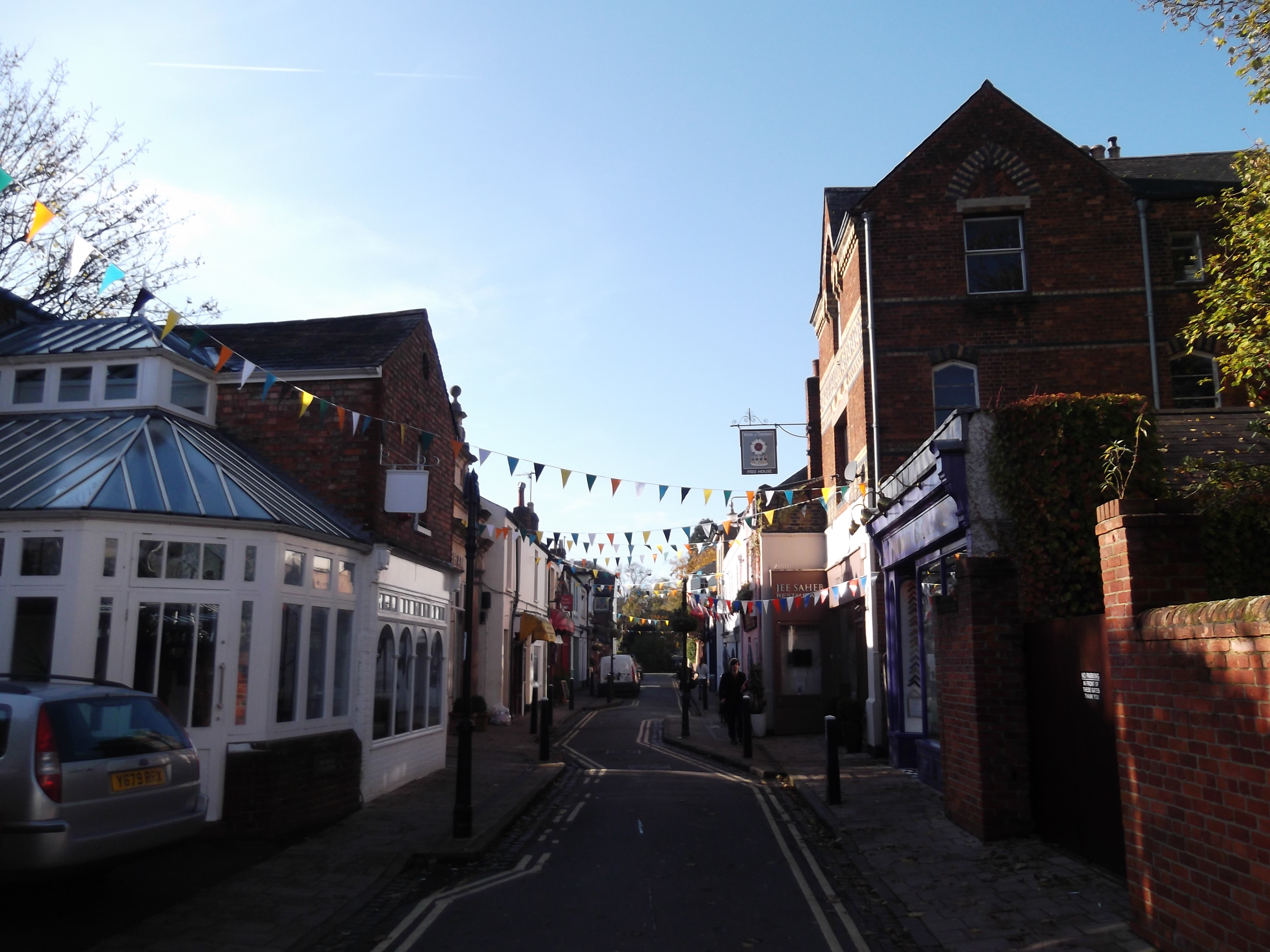
View west along North Parade with bunting.

North Parade, or more formally North Parade Avenue, is a short shopping street or parade in north Oxford, England. It runs between Winchester Road opposite Church Walk to the west and Banbury Road (with Norham Road slightly north opposite) to the east. It is the only shopping street in North Oxford between the city centre to the south and Summertown to the north.

== Overview ==
North Parade has been described as "one of the most interesting little streets in Oxford." It has pubs, shops and houses along the street. Over the years, local shops have given way to restaurants.

The Rose & Crown public house is on the north side and the Gardeners Arms pub is on the south side.

There are some additional commercial establishments stretching a little way south from North Parade along the Banbury Road. In particular, Gee's restaurant with its glasshouse structure, which used to be a florist and greengrocer, has been a restaurant since 1983.

== History ==
The land at North Parade sold as 42 lots at an auction held at the Horse & Jockey public house in May 1833. Most of the land between St Giles' and Summertown was owned by St John's College, Oxford and was sold as leasehold. As North Oxford was developed as a suburb, North Parade became a small local shopping centre for the residences in the area.

North Parade used to have traditional local shops. With the changes in people's shopping habits, most of the shops have moved up-market in their style. Shops such as a butchers, grocers, fishmongers, etc., have given way to gift shops, restaurants, etc. A monthly outdoor farmers market was established in 2012.

== Origin of the name ==
North Parade runs south of South Parade in Summertown. It is often claimed that during the Civil War when Charles I was besieged by Oliver Cromwell at Oxford, South Parade was the Roundhead southern front, while North Parade was the location of the Royalist northern front during the siege of Oxford. However, "[i]t is unlikely that the two sides would have come so close to each other without engaging in combat and, in any case, parade grounds are known to have existed elsewhere in and around the town", for instance in Port Meadow. In fact, both developments are much later:

North Parade was one of the earliest developments on St. John's leasehold land, soon after 1855, and was so called from the start ... South Parade was known by that name at least as early as 1859. We do not know which got its name first, but when either was named there would have seemed no need to consider the existence of the other. One was in Oxford, the other in a village out in the County. In terms of Oxford, North Parade was north; in terms of Summertown, South Parade was south. When Summertown was made part of Oxford, the names illogically remained.

== The Rose & Crown ==
The Rose & Crown is a pub established in 1863, and has been run by the current landlord since 1983. Regular drinkers at the Rose & Crown have included Thom Yorke of the band Radiohead, who wrote songs there.

== Literature ==
North Parade was mentioned by John Betjeman (1906–1984) in his poetry:

Shall we ever, my staunch Myfanwy
Bicycle down to North Parade?
Kant on the handle-bars, Marx in the saddlebag,
Light my touch on your shoulder-blade
