= Elliston & Cavell =

Former department store in Oxford

Elliston & Cavell Ltd
- Company type: Subsidiary (1953–1973)
- Industry: Retailing
- Founded: 1835; 191 years ago
- Founders: Michael Stratton and Barrie Stuart Trinder
- Defunct: 1973; 53 years ago
- Fate: Re-branded as Debenhams
- Successor: Debenhams
- Headquarters: Oxford, England
- Products: Clothing and Department
- Revenue: See parent company
- Net income: See parent company
- Parent: Debenhams plc (1953–present)

Elliston & Cavell was for many years the leading department store in Oxford, England. The store was located on the west side of Magdalen Street in central Oxford. The shop stocked uniforms for local schools such as the Dragon School.

== History ==
Jesse Elliston originally owned a draper's shop opposite St Mary Magdalen Church in Oxford. On 9 April 1835, at the age of 22, John Cavell married Sarah Elliston, the sister of Jesse at St John Baptist Church in Summertown, Oxford. Elliston made Cavell a partner in celebration of the marriage. Thereafter, the shop became known as Elliston & Cavell. In 1853, Jesse Elliston was found dead on his walk home from work at the age of 47, while Sarah Elliston died in 1856.

In 1861, James Cavell married his widowed sister-in-law Harriet Delf (nee Elliston); they lived above the premises at 12 Magdalen Street. James Cavell was made Mayor of Oxford for the first time in 1865 and was the Chairman of the Oxford Building & Investments Company until 1882, but died aged 74 in 1887.

The original store was demolished in 1894 to make way for the current building. It eventually became the largest department store in Oxford. The store was lavishly decorated with a sweeping staircase and a bakelite mural depicting deer in a forest glade. The ladies' powder room had basins in the shape of marble swans with gold taps, with ladies in black uniform providing dry towels.

The shop was taken over by Debenhams in 1953, but the original name was retained until 1973. The building formed part of the Debenhams store until its administration in 2020.

== See also ==
- Shepherd & Woodward
- Boswells of Oxford
