= Magdalen Street =

Street in central Oxford, England

Coordinates: 51.7548°N 1.2591°W

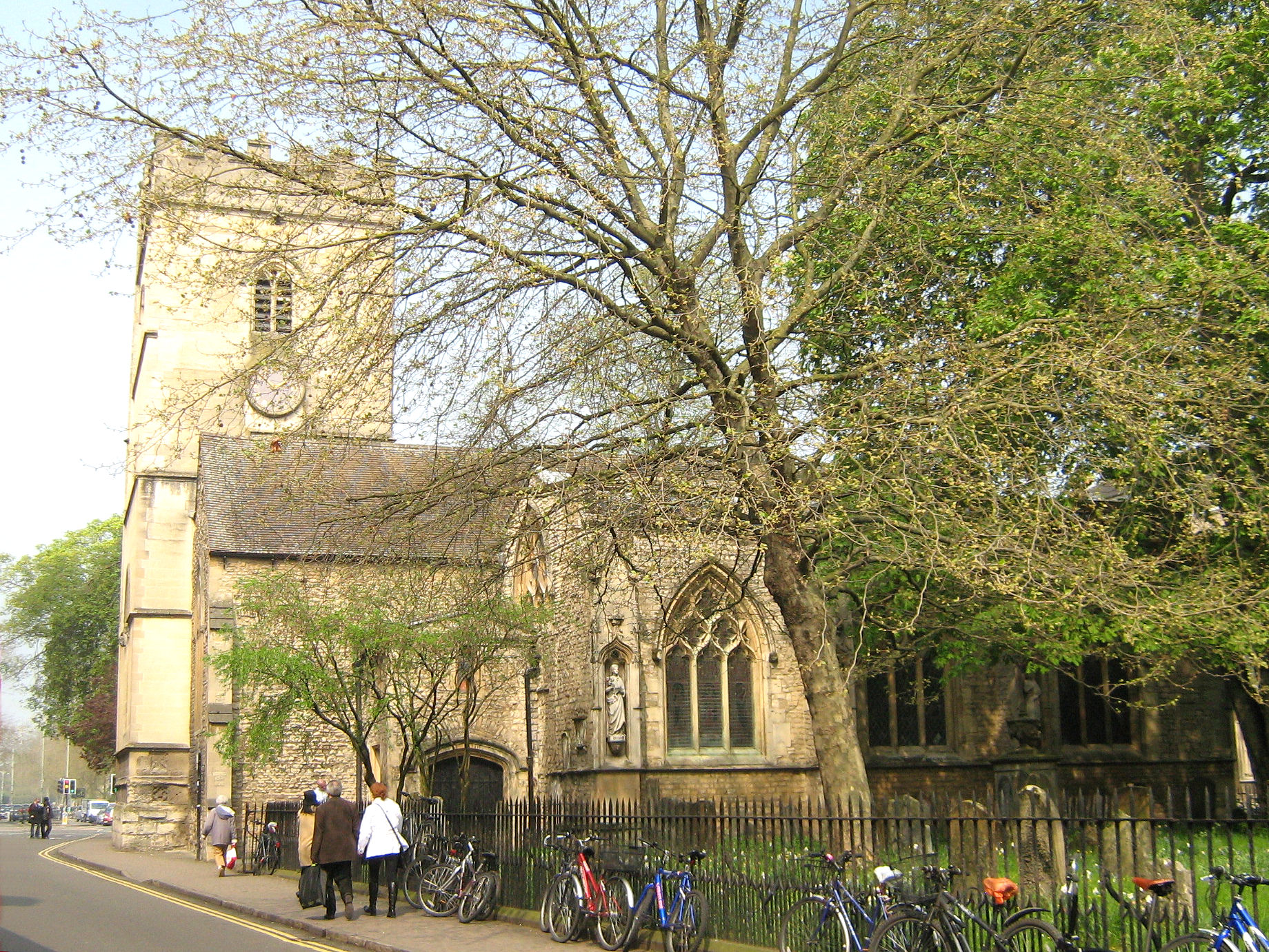
St Mary Magdalen church seen from Magdalen Street West

Location of Magdalen Street within central Oxford

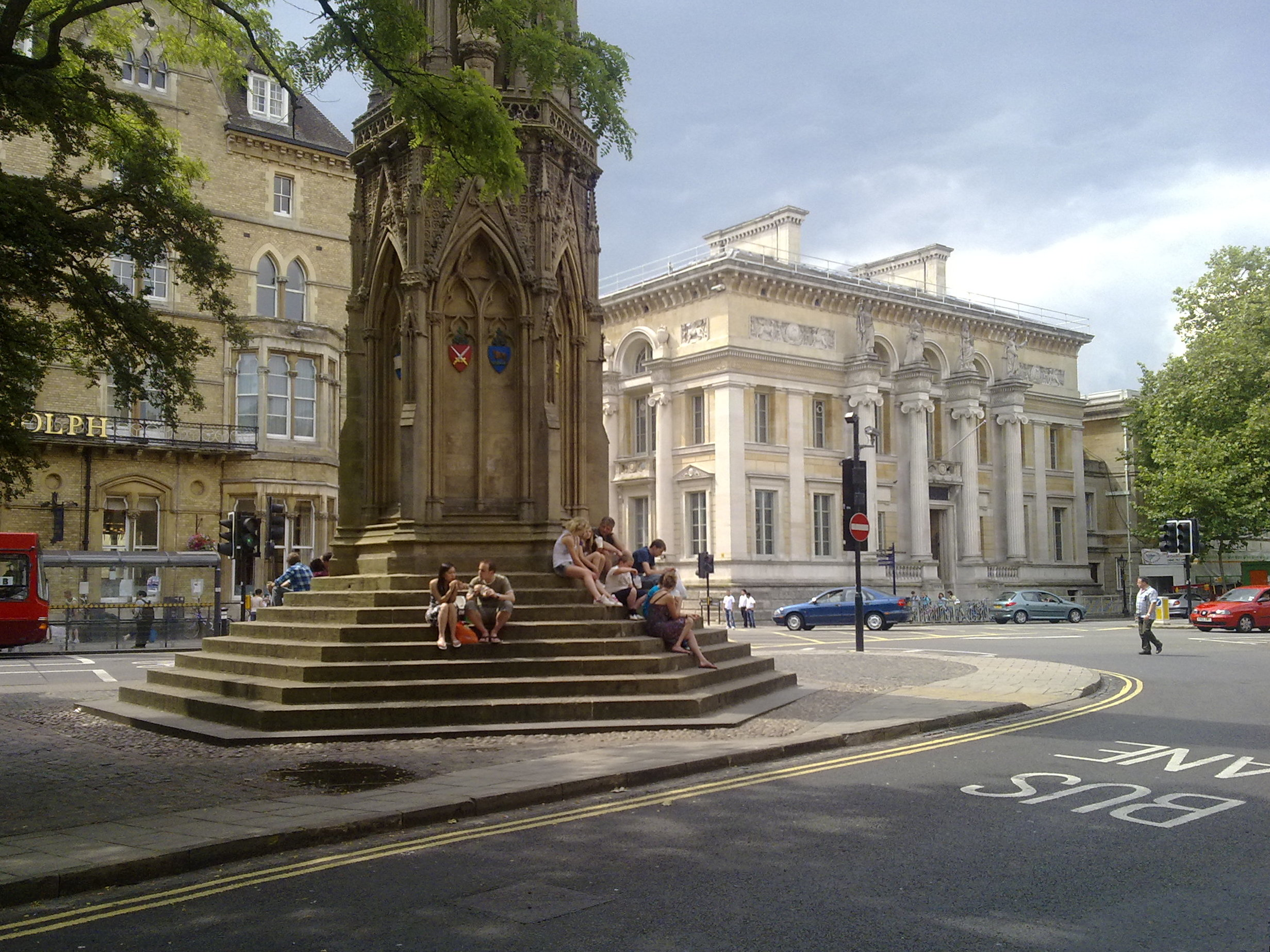
View of the Martyrs' Memorial with the Randolph Hotel and Taylor Institute behind at the north end of Magdalen Street.

Magdalen Street is a short shopping street in central Oxford, England, just north of the original north gate in the city walls. Traditionally, the name of the street is pronounced /ˈmæɡdəlɪn/ and not as the name of the Magdalen College, which is always /ˈmɔːdlɪn/.

At the southern end, Magdalen Street meets Cornmarket Street continuing to the south, Broad Street to the east and George Street to the west. At the northern end it continues as St Giles' to the north, with Beaumont Street to the west. To the west are shops. The street was the location of Oxford's leading department store for many years, Elliston & Cavell. It later became a Debenhams store. On the northern corner of Beaumont Street is the Macdonald Randolph Hotel, widely considered to be Oxford's leading hotel.

To the east is a historic church, St Mary Magdalen, originally established in Saxon times. Beyond that is Magdalen Street East and Balliol College. North of the church is the Martyrs' Memorial, commemorating the Oxford Martyrs.

Thornton's Bookshop opened on Magdalen Street in 1835 and was located here until 1840, from 1853 to 1863.

St Giles' Fair, held at the beginning of September each year and mainly in St Giles' to the north, extends into Magdalen Street. During the 1930s, the poet John Betjeman noted that:

It is about the biggest fair in England. The whole of St Giles' and even Magdalen Street by Elliston and Cavell's right up to and beyond the War Memorial, at the meeting of the Woodstock and Banbury roads, is thick with freak shows, roundabouts, cake-walks, the whip, and the witching waves.
