= St Giles' Fair =

Annual street fair in Oxford, UK

Coordinates: 51.7580°N 1.2601°W

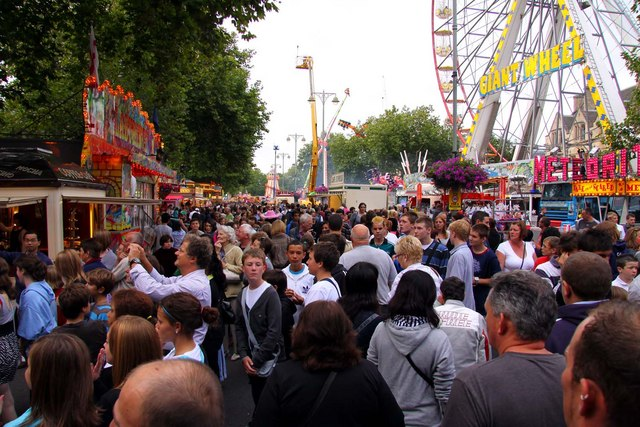
General view looking north at St Giles Fair in 2005

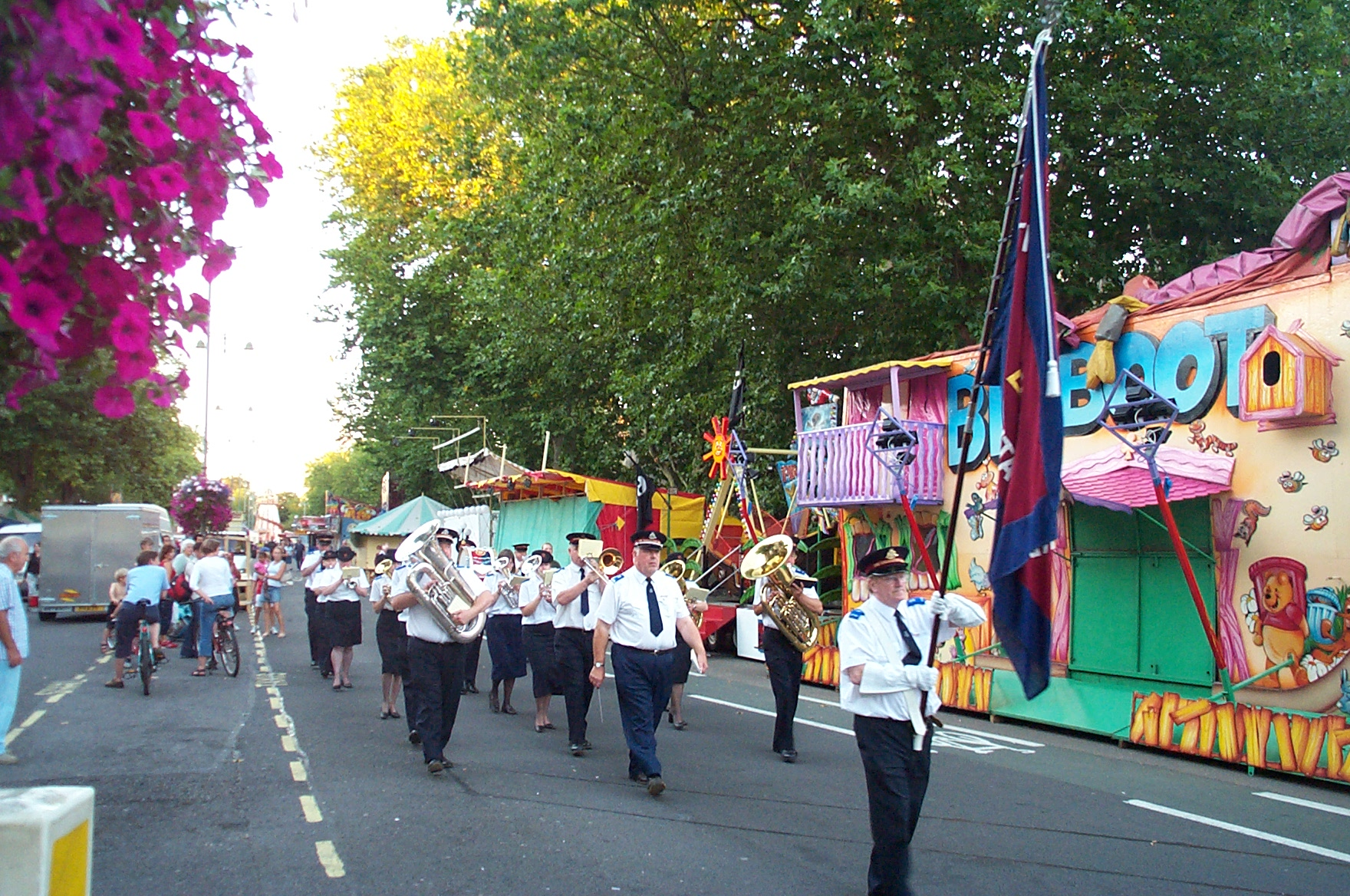
Salvation Army parade through the site of St Giles' Fair in 2004.

St Giles' Fair roundabout, 2007

St Giles' Fair (also St Giles Fair) is an annual fair held in St Giles', a wide thoroughfare in central Oxford, England. The origins of the fair can be traced back to medieval times where it became one of England's dynamic trading centers. The fair has survived medieval times and is organised for a two-day duration in September each year by the Oxford City Council with the London and Home Counties section of the Showmen's Guild of Great Britain.

== History ==
The earliest reference for the fair is from The Session Rolls of James I, and the origins of the fair related to St Giles' Church at the north end of St Giles (Oxford, Oxfordshire)'. This was originally completed in 1120, but the church was not actually consecrated until 1200, by St Hugh of Lincoln, a Carthusian monk and bishop. As part of the commemoration of the consecration, St Giles' Fair was established. The fair was parted between the `college' and the `city' side, with the college side tracing its rights to the fair from the Manor of Walton.

The medieval fair was held in Walton Manor, where it took place in the St Giles' churchyard on St Giles Day and during the following week. There were also various pleasant traditions, such as anyone with a beershop was allowed to bring barrels of beer to St Giles' Fair for sale. Another custom was that any householder in St Giles itself could sell beer and spirits during the fair by hanging the bough of a tree over their front door.

The fair had Queen Elizabeth I staying in Oxford between 3–10 September 1567 and watched the fair from the windows of St John's College on the east side of St Giles'. It evolved from the St Giles' parish wake, first recorded in 1624, and which became known as St Giles' Feast. In the 1780s, it was a toy fair, with cheap items for sale. By 1800, it had become a more general fair with stalls and rides. From the 1830s, the fair included adult amusements and it became more rowdy, so much so that there were calls for it to be closed.

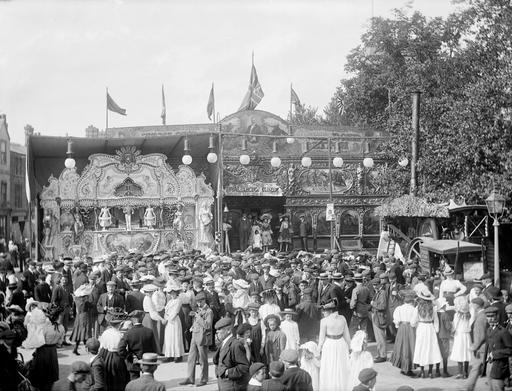
The fair in 1905, photographed by Henry Taunt

By the Victorian era, with train travel excursions becoming available, the fair was attracting people from places as far away as Birmingham and Cardiff. In 1930 Oxford's city corporation, now the Oxford City Council, took over the running of the fair. In the 1930s the poet John Betjeman described the fair as follows:

It is about the biggest fair in England. The whole of St Giles' and even Magdalen Street by Elliston and Cavell's right up to and beyond the War Memorial, at the meeting of the Woodstock and Banbury roads, is thick with freak shows, roundabouts, cake-walks, the whip, and the witching waves.

The fair continues to this day, nowadays as a funfair, held on the Monday and Tuesday after the Sunday following 1 September, which is St Giles' Day. It is unusual for an English fair, being held in a major street of a city and blocking traffic for its two-day duration in September each year. It is organised by the Oxford City Council with the London and Home Counties section of the Showmen's Guild of Great Britain.

The street is closed to traffic for two days each September for this traditional fair. Formerly, the University Parks were also closed at the same time to show that they are owned by the University of Oxford rather than formally being public. The fair also extends into Magdalen Street to the south and Banbury Road and Woodstock Road to the north.

This fair went on hiatus in 2020 but returned in 2021.
