= Cakewalk (carnival game) =

Game at funfairs to raise money

Cakewalk (or cake-walk) is a game played at carnivals, funfairs, and fundraising events. It is similar to a raffle and musical chairs.

== Background ==
Tickets are sold to participants, and a path of numbered squares is laid out on a rug, with one square per ticket sold. The participants walk around the path in time to music, which plays for a duration and then stops. A number is drawn at random and called out, and the person standing on that number wins a cake or other pastry as a prize (hence the name).

During the 1930s, the English poet John Betjeman described St Giles' Fair in Oxford as follows:

It is about the biggest fair in England. The whole of St Giles' … is thick with freak shows, roundabouts, cake-walks, the whip, and the witching waves.
