= Beaumont Street =

Street in central Oxford, England

Coordinates: 51.7550°N 1.2608°W

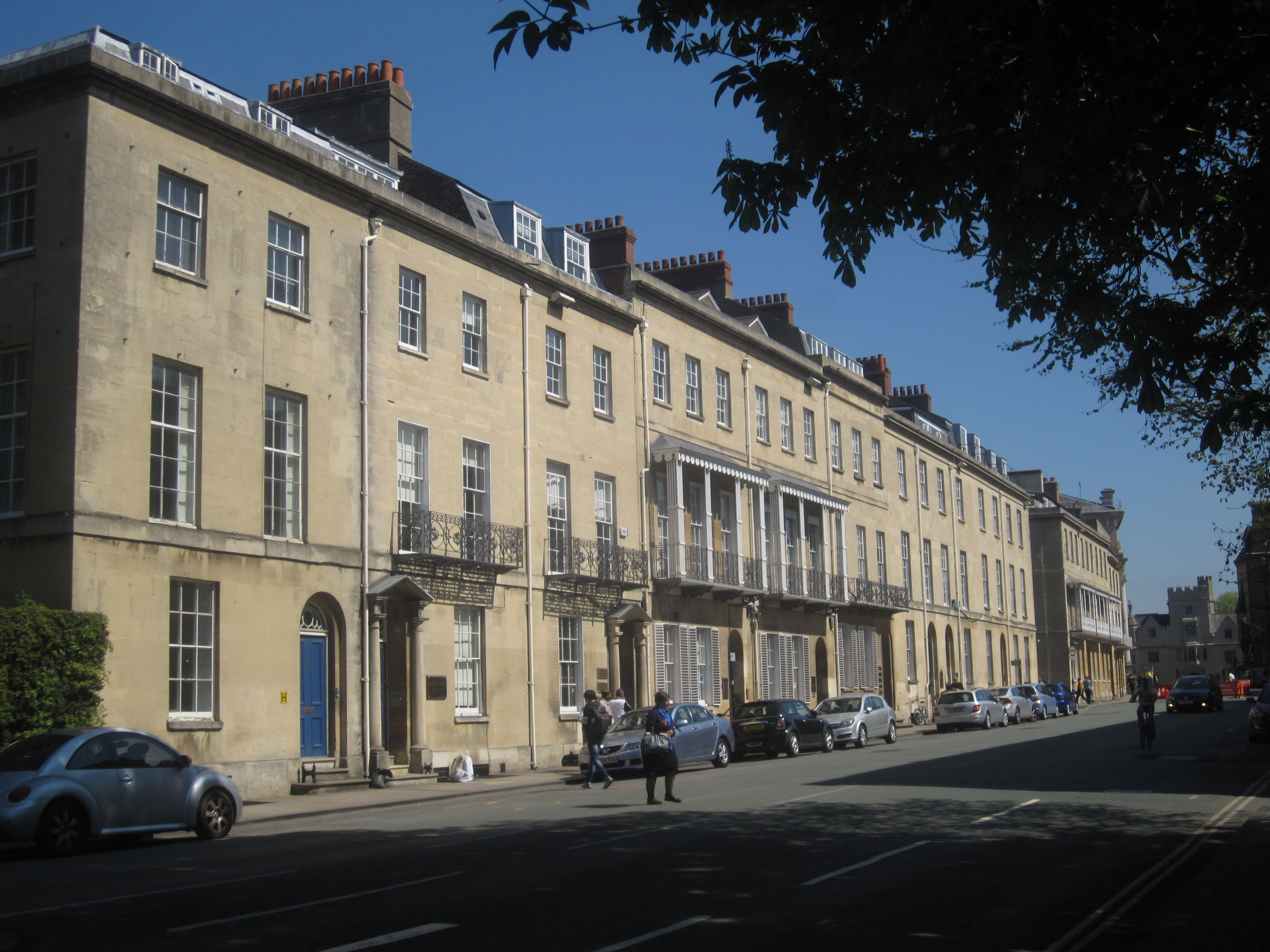
View along Beaumont Street

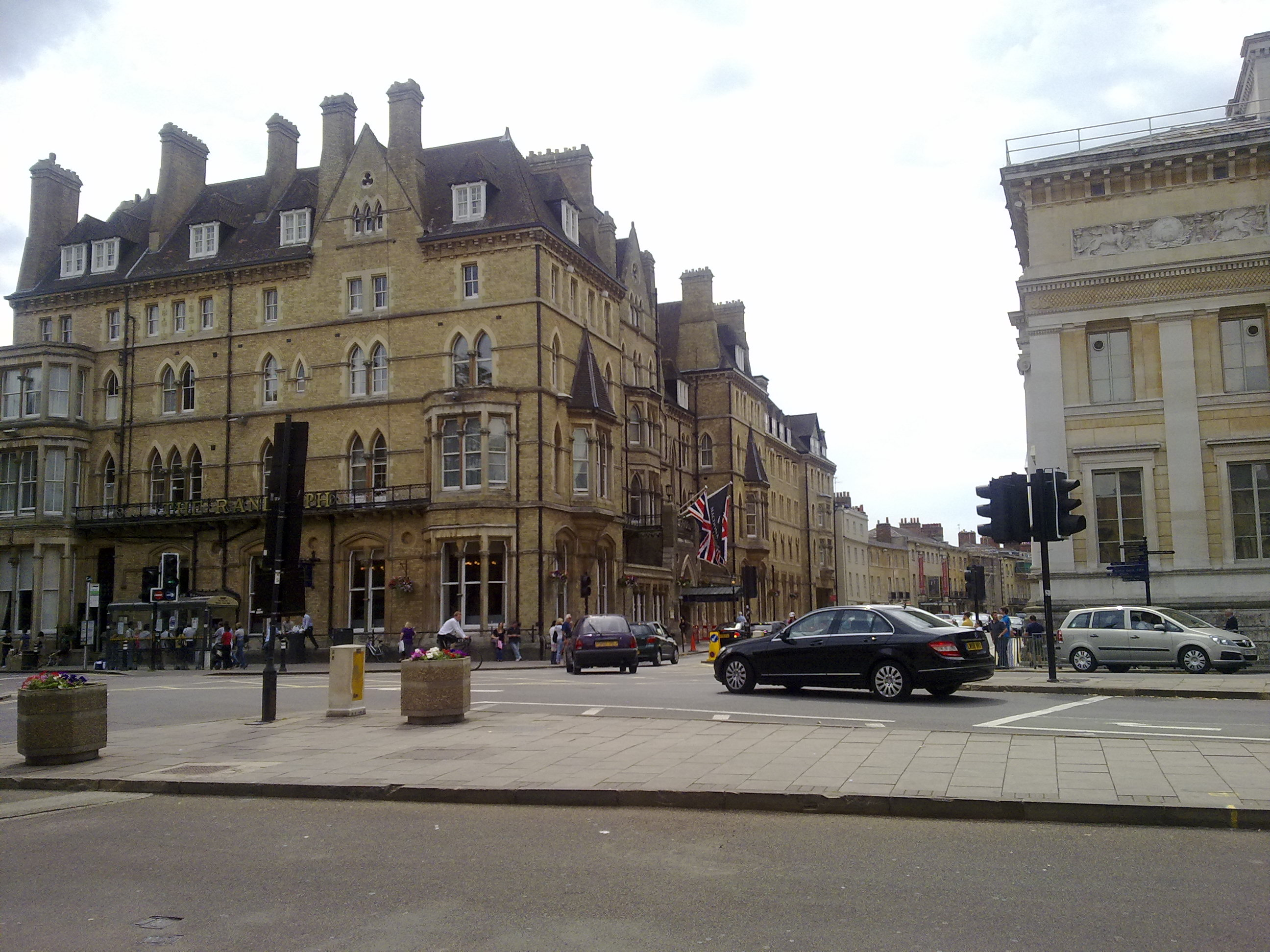
View from the south end of St Giles' looking west along Beaumont Street, with the Randolph Hotel on the left and the Taylor Institution Library on the right

Beaumont Street is a street in the centre of Oxford, England.

The street was laid out during 1822–1833. From 1828 to 1837, elegant terraced houses in the Regency style were built. Before that, it was the location of Beaumont Palace, now noted by a plaque near the junction with Walton Street. Nikolaus Pevsner considered it "the finest street ensemble of Oxford".

Kings Richard I (reigned 1189–1199) and John (reigned 1199–1216), both sons of Henry II, were born at Beaumont Palace on 8 September 1157 and 24 December 1166 respectively.

At the western end is Worcester College and the junction with Walton Street to the north and Worcester Street to the south. Halfway along to the north is St John Street. To the south is the Oxford Playhouse, designed by Sir Edward Maufe and built in 1938, where many university productions are held. To the north, at the eastern end, is the Ashmolean Museum. Opposite the eastern end is the Martyrs' Memorial. Here, Beaumont Street adjoins St Giles' to the north and Magdalen Street to the south. Oxford's foremost hotel, the Randolph, is on the corner with Magdalen Street, designed by William Wilkinson in the Victorian Gothic style and built in 1864. An extension was added in 1952 to the west, designed by J. Hopgood.

The Institute of Archaeology, part of Oxford University's School of Archaeology, was established in 1962 and is located at 36 Beaumont Street.

The British poet and translator Francis William Bourdillon mentions Beaumont Street in his poem "Gertrude's Love":

Just at the end of Beaumont Street,
In front of Worcester walls,
Strange shrieks of woe the passer greet,
As every footstep falls.

The street is a favoured location for dentists and doctors.

== Gallery ==
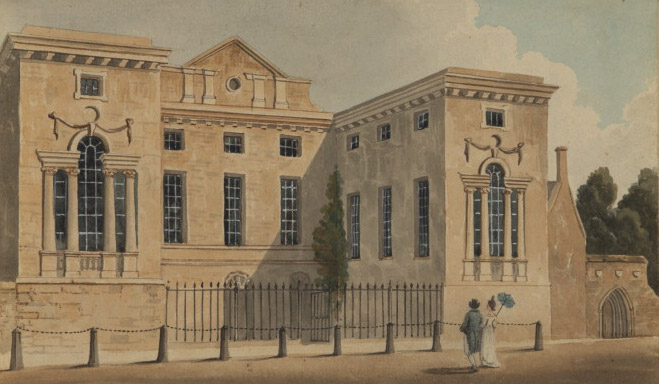
A 19th-century print of the main entrance of Worcester College, which faces down Beaumont Street at the western end.

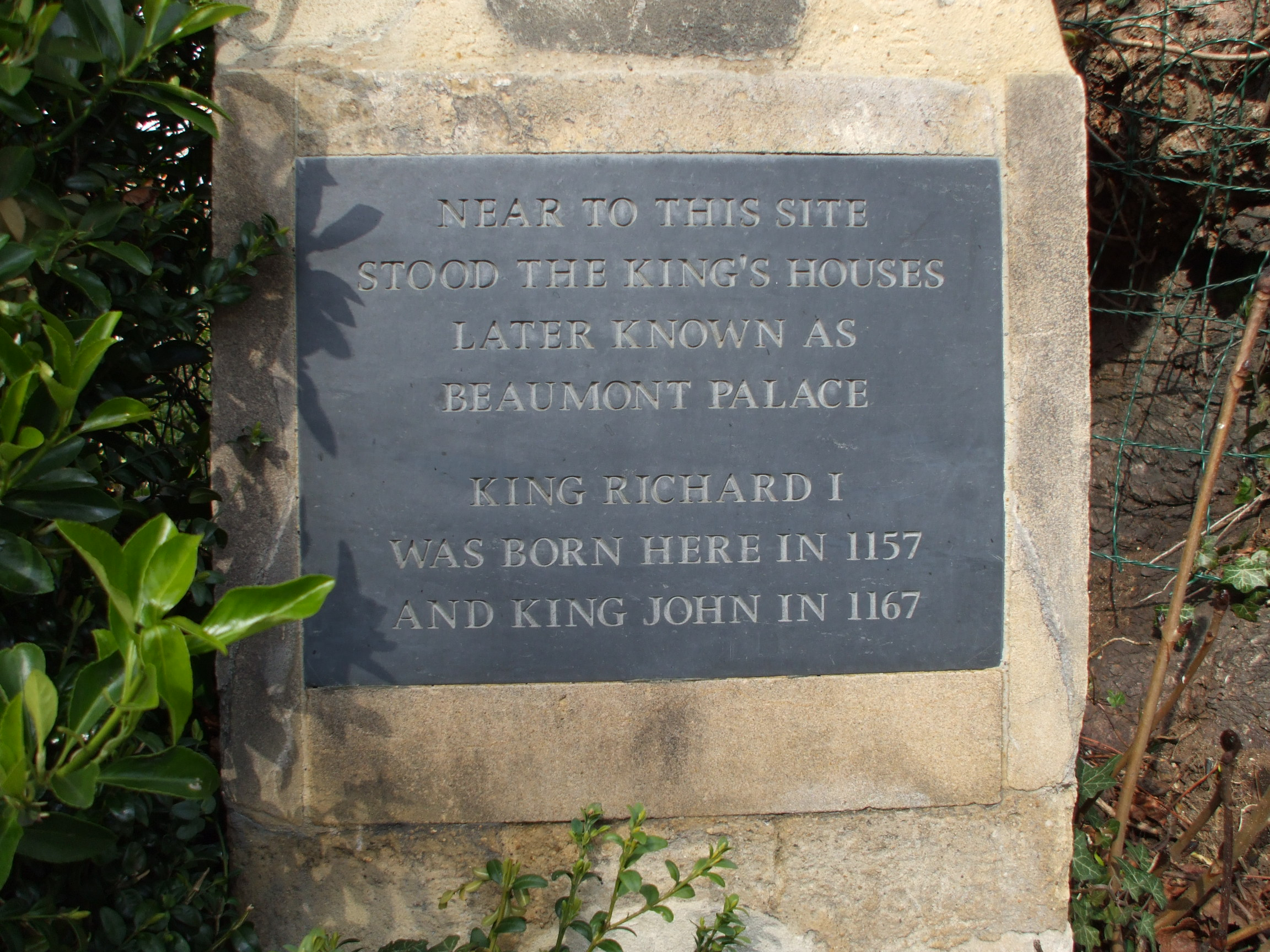
The plaque noting the site of Beaumont Palace.

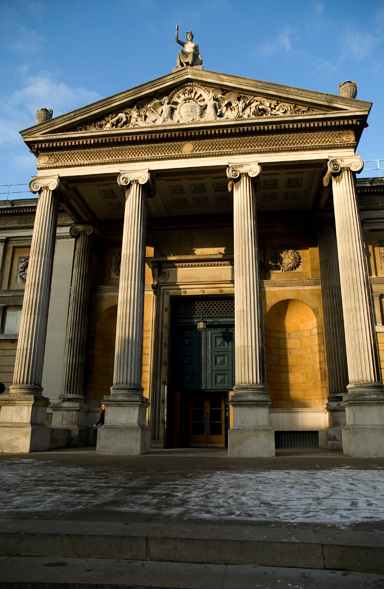
The Ashmolean Museum main entrance on the north side of Beaumont Street.

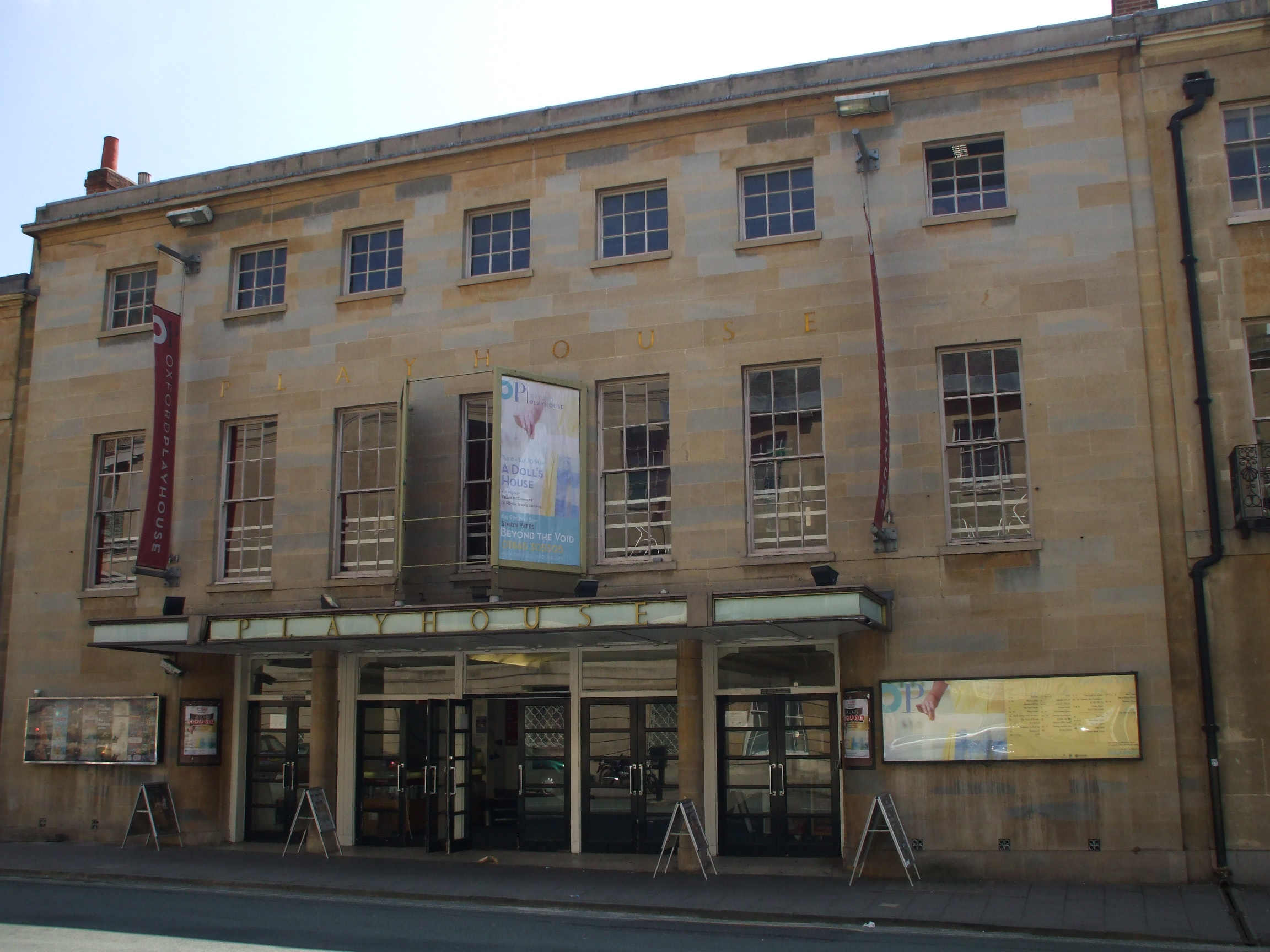
The Oxford Playhouse entrance on the south side of Beaumont Street.
