= Randolph Hotel, Oxford =

Hotel in Oxford, England

Coordinates: 51.7550°N 1.2596°W

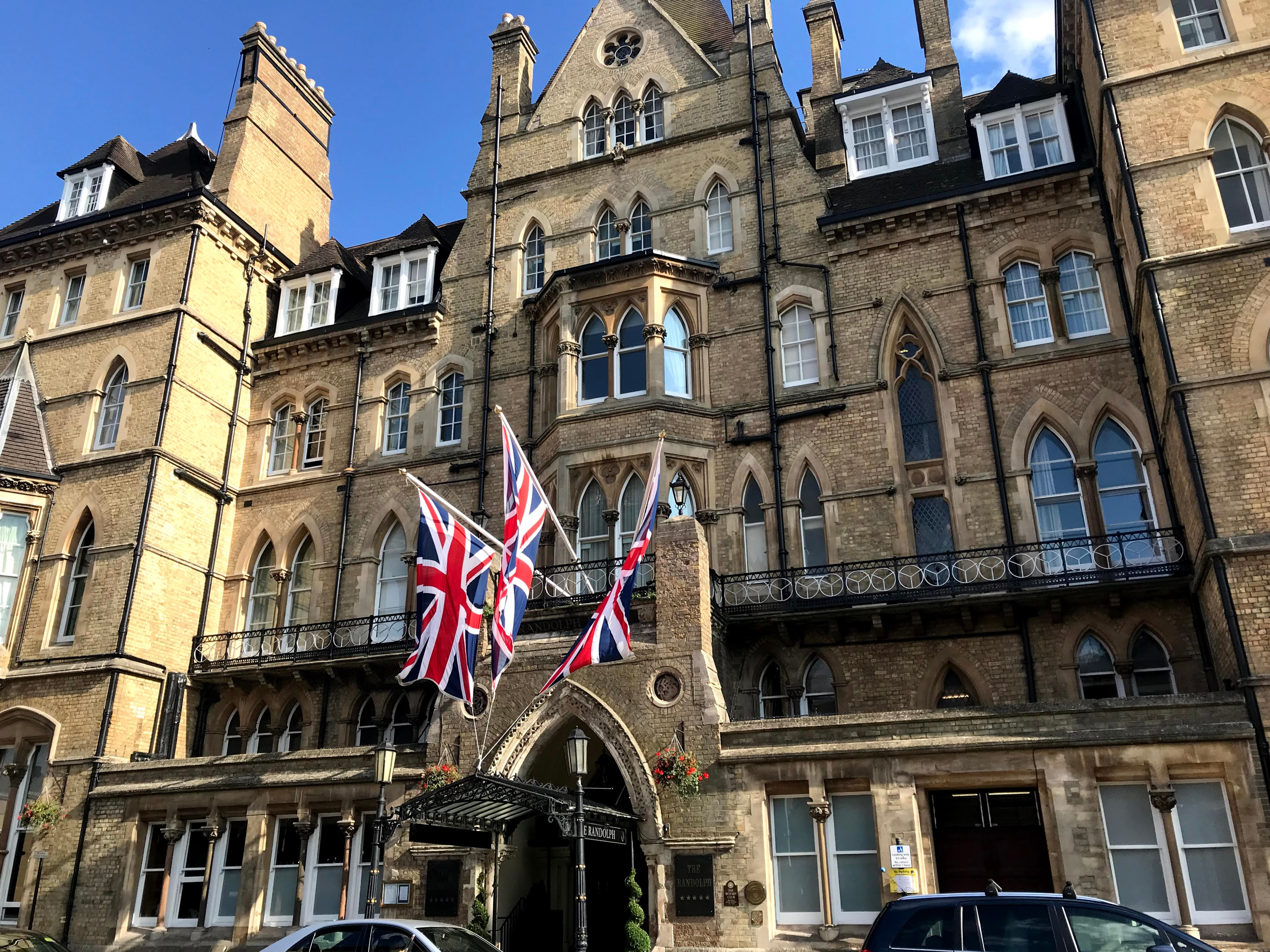
Front entrance of the Randolph Hotel

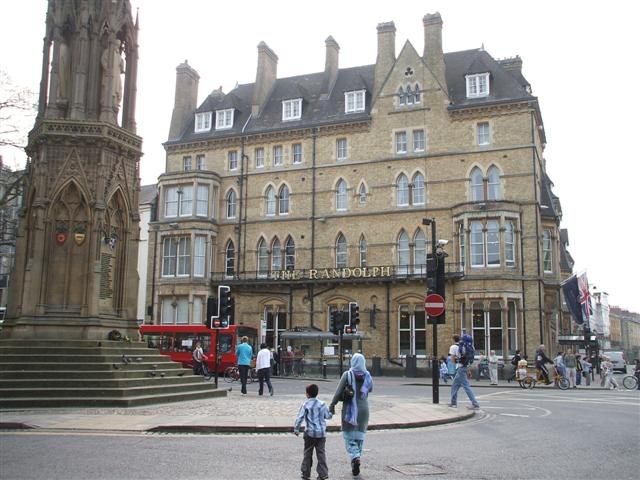
View of the hotel from the east, with the Martyrs' Memorial on the left and Beaumont Street on the right.

The Randolph Hotel, also known as The Randolph Hotel by Graduate Hotels, is a 5-star hotel in Oxford, England, on the south side of Beaumont Street, at the corner with Magdalen Street, opposite the Ashmolean Museum and close to the Oxford Playhouse. The hotel building is in the Victorian Gothic style.

The hotel featured in the Inspector Morse television series several times, in particular the episode "The Wolvercote Tongue". The cast stayed at the hotel during filming in 1987 and there is now a Morse Bar. It was also in the follow-up series Lewis.

== History ==
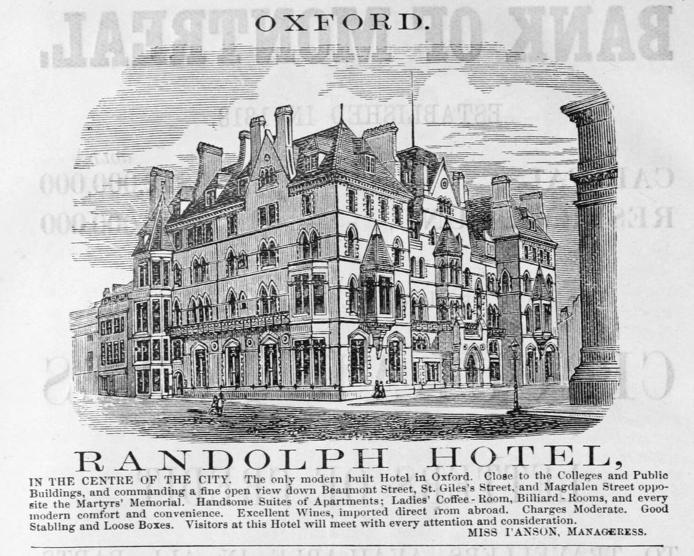
Advertisement for the Randolph Hotel in the Harper's Hand-book for Travellers in Europe and the East (1885).

Construction of the Randolph Hotel began in 1864, to a design by William Wilkinson, an architect who also designed many houses in North Oxford. There was debate about the building's design. John Ruskin favoured Gothic Revival like the nearby Martyrs' Memorial. The City Council wanted a classical style since the rest the buildings in Beaumont Street were early 19th century Regency. A compromise was attained with a simplified Gothic façade, similar to the Oxford University Museum and the Oxford Union buildings, but in brick.

The hotel was named not after Lord Randolph Churchill, who was connected with Blenheim Palace to the north of Oxford, but after Dr Francis Randolph, an eighteenth century university benefactor. The university or Randolph Galleries (now part of the Ashmolean Museum) were built as a result of a thousand-pound gift left by Dr Randolph, a former Principal of St Alban Hall (now part of Merton College), who died in 1796.

The hotel was opened in 1866. Major refurbishments of the hotel were undertaken in 1952, 1978, 1988 and 2000. During the 1952 renovations, an extension was added to the west, designed by J. Hopgood.

On 17 April 2015, the Randolph Hotel had a "significant fire" (declared by the Oxfordshire Fire and Rescue Service). The fire was confirmed to have started in the kitchens on the ground floor. It spread through building voids, eventually reaching the roof. The emergency services were called at 16:46 and came at about 16:52. There were no casualties, and the Oxfordshire Fire Service praised the hotel for its "quick evacuation processes." The fire ended around 20:00. It was caused by the cooking of flambéed beef in the kitchen.

The Randolph Hotel was acquired in 2019 by the American chain Graduate Hotels.

Location of The Randolph within central Oxford
