= The Whip (ride) =

Type of amusement ride

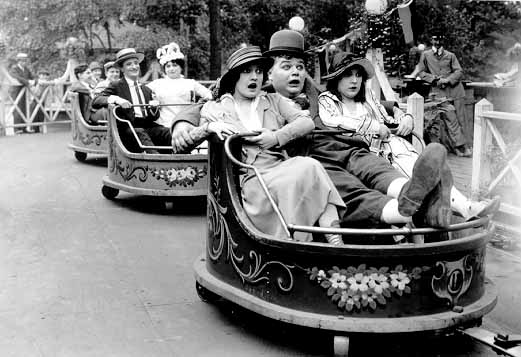
Comedian and film actor Fatty Arbuckle riding The Whip at Luna Park, Coney Island, in a 1917 film

The Whip is a type of amusement ride originally designed and built by W.F. Mangels Company of Coney Island, New York. William F. Mangels patented the ride in 1914, and it soon became popular.

The Whip spread to other countries, such as England, during the 1930s. The English poet John Betjeman described St Giles' Fair in Oxford as follows:

It is about the biggest fair in England. The whole of St Giles' … is thick with freak shows, roundabouts, cake-walks, the whip, and the witching waves.

— Alison Petch

The ride consists of two circular wheel-like turn-table platforms on opposing sides of a rectangular base. Motors turn a cable that leads a number of attached two or three-person cars around a laminated wooden track. The car follows the track while the cable turns. When the car reaches one of the turn-table platforms, the speed picks up, throwing riders to one side as the car whips around the corner. Models of the ride with eight, ten, or twelve cars were available. Only one 16-car model is known to exist, operating at Kennywood. A children's version of the ride was also available. Throughout urban areas in the United States, mobile versions of the ride were once prevalent on the streets of many cities. A modern version of The Whip is currently offered by Sellner Manufacturing.

The normal minimum rider height requirement is 46 inches tall unless with an adult at most parks.

== Notable installations ==
Two of the oldest The Whip rides operating today are a 1918 model at Dorney Park & Wildwater Kingdom in Allentown, Pennsylvania, and a 1926 model at Kennywood in West Mifflin, Pennsylvania. The Whip at Playland in Rye, New York was made in 1928, and is one of the park's oldest rides. Another installation of a classic The Whip is at Knoebels Amusement Resort in Elysburg, Pennsylvania. This ride, called Whipper, was originally installed at a park in Hunlock Creek, Pennsylvania called Croops Glen, and was moved to Knoebels in the 1940s after Croops Glen closed. Another The Whip is in operation at Heritage Park Historical Village in Calgary, Alberta. Another original The Whip is located at Camden Park in Huntington, West Virginia, which also has a miniature version of the ride for children called The Whip Jr.
