= Beaumont Palace =

Former palace in Oxford, England

Coordinates: 51.7550°N 1.2627°W

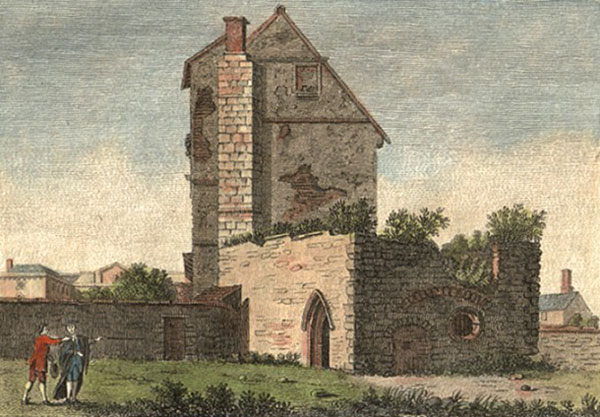
Beaumont Palace in 1785

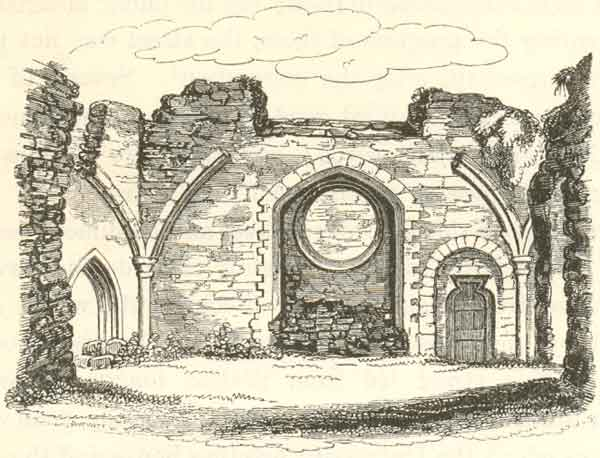
1800 sketch of the ruins, showing the inside of the forebuilding above

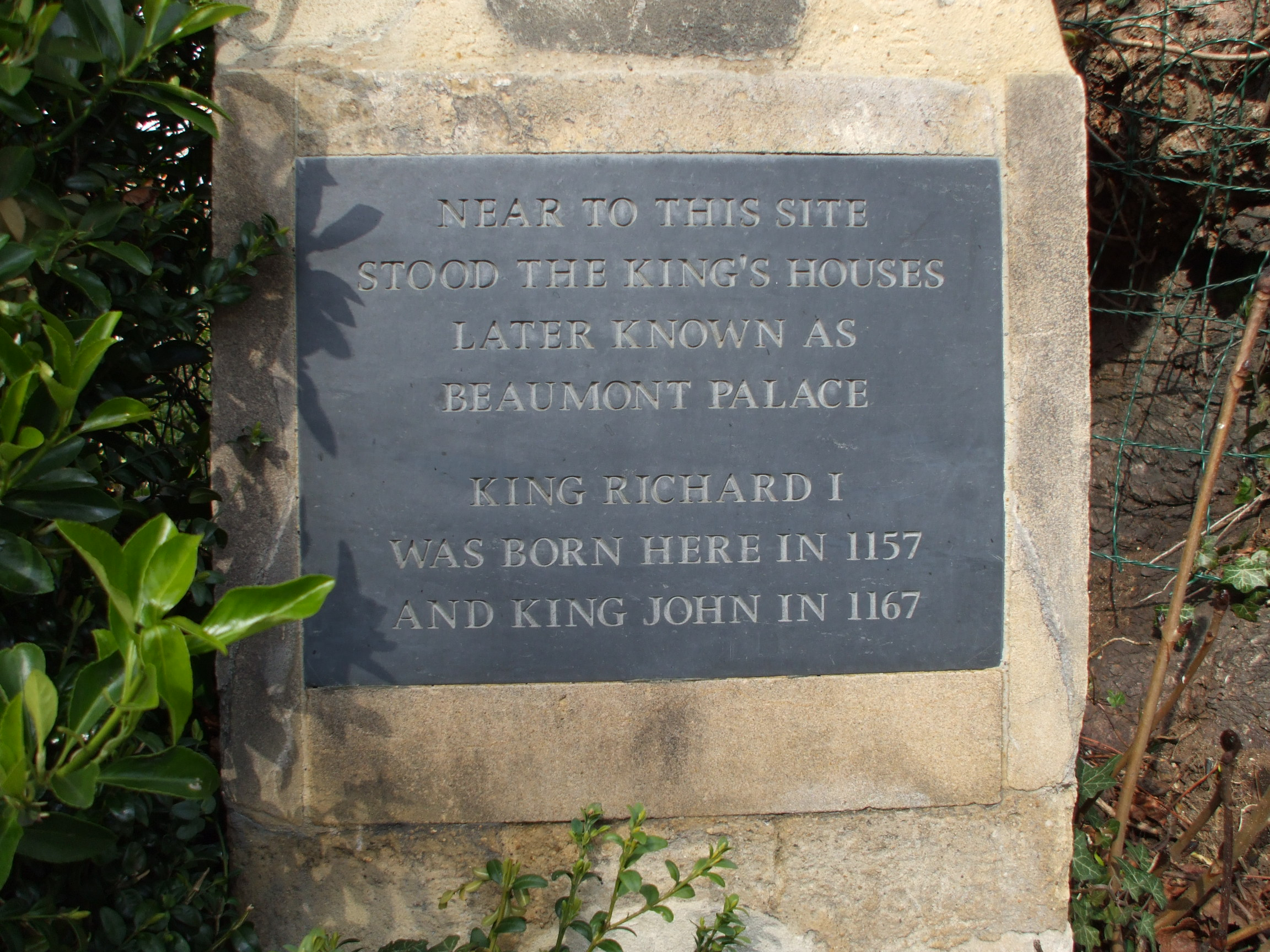
The plaque on Beaumont Street near the site of Beaumont Palace

Beaumont Palace, built outside the north gate of Oxford, was intended by Henry I about 1130 to serve as a royal palace conveniently close to the royal hunting-lodge at Woodstock (now part of the park of Blenheim Palace). Its former presence is recorded in Beaumont Street, Oxford. Set into a pillar on the north side of the street, near Walton Street, is a stone with the inscription: "Near to this site stood the King's Houses later known as Beaumont Palace. King Richard I was born here in 1157 and King John in 1167." The "King's House" was the range of the palace that contained the king's lodgings.

Henry spent Easter 1133 in the nova aula – his "new hall" at Beaumont – in great pomp, celebrating the birth of his grandson, the future Henry II. Edward I was the last king to sojourn in Beaumont officially as a palace, and in 1275 he granted it to an Italian lawyer, Francesco Accorsi, who had undertaken diplomatic missions for him. When Edward II was put to flight at the Battle of Bannockburn in 1314, he is said to have invoked the Virgin Mary and vowed to found a monastery for the Carmelites (the White Friars) if he might escape safely. In fulfilment of his vow he remanded Beaumont Palace to the Carmelites in 1318.

In 1318, the Palace was the scene for the beginnings of the John Deydras affair, in which a royal pretender, arguing that he was the rightful king of England, claimed the Palace for his own. John Deydras was ultimately executed for sedition.

When the White Friars were disbanded at the Reformation, most of the structure was dismantled and the building stone reused in Christ Church and St John's College. An engraving of 1785 shows the remains of Beaumont Palace, the last of which were destroyed in the laying out of Beaumont Street in 1829.
