= Henry Weekes =

English sculptor (1807–1877)

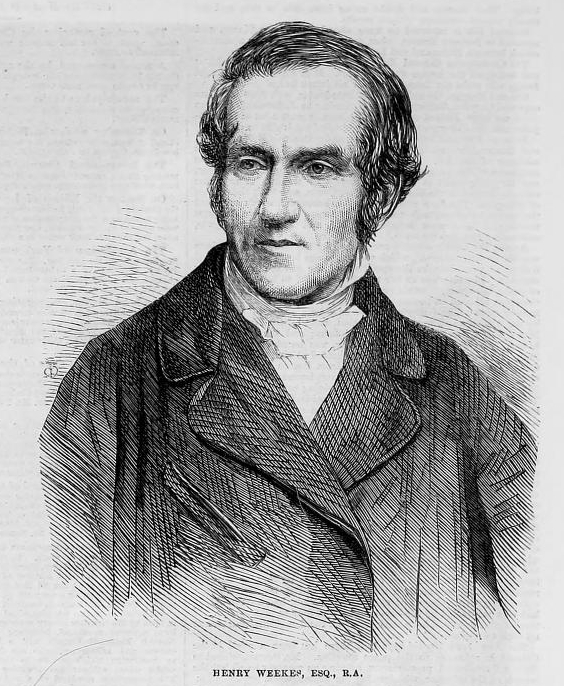

Henry Weekes RA (14 January 1807 – 28 May 1877) was an English sculptor, best known for his portraiture. He was among the most successful British sculptors of the mid-Victorian period.

== Personal life ==
Weekes was born at Canterbury, Kent, to Capon Weekes, a banker's clerk, and his wife, Mary Pearson. He attended The King's School, Canterbury of his home town.

He spent most of his career in London, where he worked for William Behnes and Sir Francis Chantrey, before taking over the latter's studio on his death in 1841. His works include the first bust of Queen Victoria after her accession, a monument to Percy Bysshe Shelley and Mary Shelley, statues for the Martyrs' Memorial in Oxford, and the Manufactures group of the Albert Memorial in London.

He was also the professor of sculpture of the Royal Academy (1868–76). His lectures, published posthumously, were described by art historian Benedict Read as "the most consistent and intelligent exposition of sculptural thinking" of his era.

His younger brother was the artist, William Weekes (1856–1909). Of his own five children, Henry Weekes (fl. 1850–1884) and Herbert William Weekes (fl. 1864–1904) were both genre painters known for their animal studies, and Frederick Weekes (1833–1920) was an artist and expert on medieval costume and design. A further son was John Ernest Weekes.

Retiring in May 1877, Weekes died of heart disease soon afterwards. His date and place of death are variously given as 28 May 1877 in Pimlico, London and 28 June 1877 in Ramsgate, Kent. His grave, in Kensal Green Cemetery gives the May date.

== Career ==
Weekes was apprenticed to William Behnes in London (1822–7), entering the Royal Academy Schools in 1823, where he won a silver medal for sculpture in 1826. He became an assistant to the well-known portrait sculptor, Sir Francis Chantrey, in 1827, remaining with him until Chantrey's death in 1841.

His early commissions were from his home town of Canterbury, and included busts of Stephen Lushington, MP for Canterbury and governor of Madras, and his father-in-law George Harris, Baron Harris of Seringapatam and Mysore for the Canterbury Philosophical Society. This led to a series of Indian commissions including works for St George's Cathedral, Madras (now Chennai). In 1838, he was the first sculptor to execute a bust of Queen Victoria, being commissioned by the queen as a gift for her mother, Princess Victoria of Saxe-Coburg-Saalfeld. His sensitive depiction of the young queen established a reputation for portraiture.

On Chantrey's death, Weekes took over his studio and, at Chantrey's request, completed his unfinished works, most notably an equestrian bronze of the Duke of Wellington for the Royal Exchange. His subsequent career flourished; one of the most successful British sculptors of the mid-Victorian period, he left nearly £30,000 at his death. Despite the considerable success he enjoyed during his lifetime, his reputation was not long-lasting, and the rise of the New Sculpture shortly after his death led to his works being neglected.

An associate of the Royal Academy from 1851, he was elected a Royal Academician in 1863. In 1851, he won a gold medal from the Royal Society of Arts for an essay on the Great Exhibition. He was the academy's professor of sculpture from 1868 until 1876.

== Key works and style ==
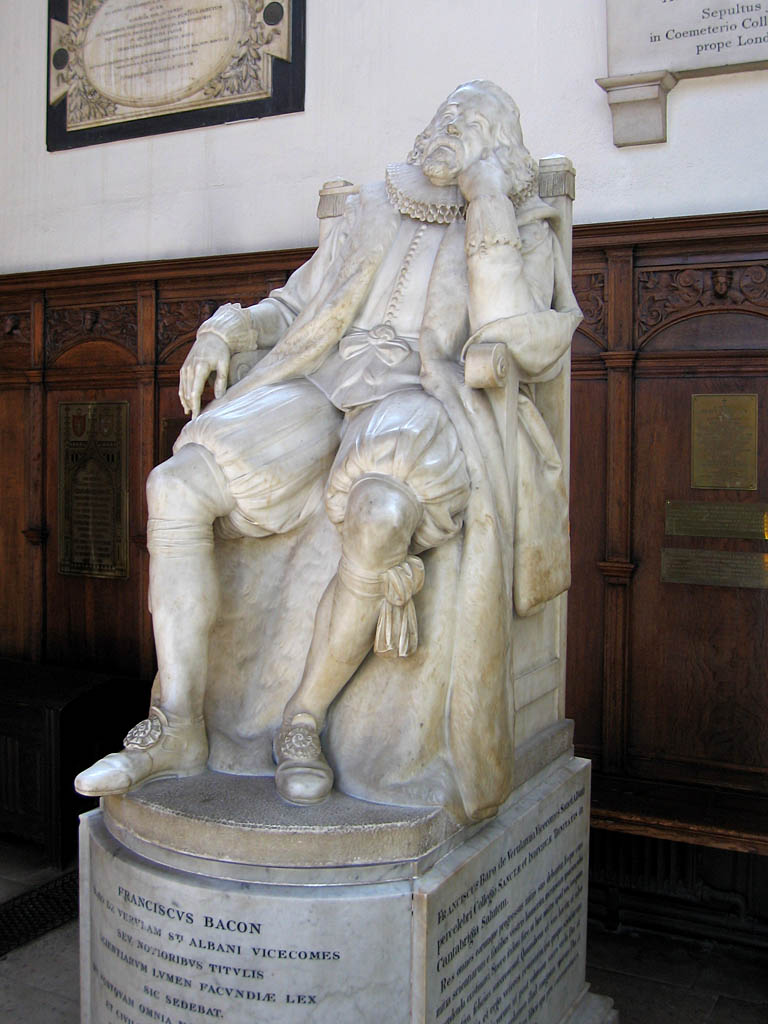
Statue of Francis Bacon in Trinity College Chapel, Cambridge

Weekes exhibited 124 works at the Royal Academy between 1828 and his death, with over a hundred being portraits. He wrote in 1852 that the objective of portraiture was "to give the eye permanently that which no history or biography will be able hereafter thoroughly to convey to the imagination." His best works achieve this aim, combining emotional impact with accurate portraiture and exemplary technique. A contemporary reviewer praised his work for its "truth of character and delicacy of expression."

Apart from the 1838 bust of Queen Victoria, his first major works were statues of Thomas Cranmer, Hugh Latimer and Nicholas Ridley for George Gilbert Scott's Martyrs' Memorial in Oxford, which he completed under Chantrey's direction in 1841. Another early commission of an historical figure was a seated statue of Francis Bacon, which he executed for Trinity College, Cambridge in 1845.

Originally strongly influenced by Chantrey, Weekes developed a more individual style towards the end of the 1840s, introducing naturalistic detailing into his neo-classical works. Mark Stocker, an expert on Victorian sculpture, considers that "His sculpture and writings, more than any other contemporary sculptor's, embodied current beliefs in fusing classicism and realism." Weekes was, however, against what he considered excessive realism, as exemplified by his contemporary Carlo Marochetti; he always opposed the colouring of sculpture, instead applying, for example, deep undercutting.

Two funerary monuments exemplify Weekes' style from this period, and are considered his finest works. That of 1849 to Samuel Whitbread and Lady Elizabeth Whitbread, in Cardington, Bedfordshire, is executed in high relief. It depicts the couple kneeling in a pose that echoes Chantrey's monument of 1835 to Reginald Heber in St Paul's Cathedral, except that Lady Elizabeth leans against her husband's shoulder with evident affection.

His marble monument to Percy Bysshe Shelley and Mary Wollstonecraft Shelley (1853/4) was commissioned by their son, Sir Percy Shelley, and his wife after the death of Mary Shelley. Unlike the later Shelley memorial by Onslow Ford, Weekes has chosen to include the figure of Mary Shelley. The pose echoes Michelangelo's Pietà, with the poet cradled by an idealised figure of his mourning wife. Weekes, however, depicts not a heroic nude in the neo-classical tradition but a bloodless corpse, and realistic details, including seaweed wrapped around his arm, recall the particulars of Shelley's death by drowning in Italy. The monument was the subject of contemporary critical acclaim, but St Peter's Church, Bournemouth, where Mary Shelley was buried, refused to take the work, and it was installed instead in Christchurch Priory.

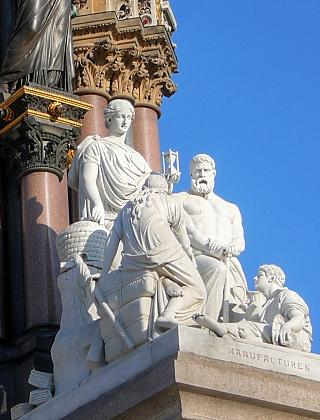
Manufactures group, one of four surrounding the central canopy of the Albert Memorial, London

Unlike Chantrey, Weekes executed a few ideal figures from 1850 onwards. The Suppliant (1850), his earliest work in this genre, secured his election as an associate of the Royal Academy. Resting after a Run, also known as Girl with the Hoop (1850/1), depicts the daughter of Frederick J. Reed in an idealised picture of childhood. Like the Shelley monument, his popular work The Young Naturalist (1854), showing a young girl examining nature at the seaside, juxtaposes realism with idealism, with a child in an 1850s bathing suit clutching a starfish in a pose reminiscent of the crouching Venus and Venus Pudica. Other works in this genre include Sardanapalus (1861), from Lord Byron's verse tragedy on the Assyrian king, and Luna (1866), depicting a girl with the moon as a shield.

He also continued his early success with realistic historical figures, at that time very fashionable, with a series of works including John Hunter, after a portrait by Sir Joshua Reynolds, for the Royal College of Surgeons in London (1864); William Harvey, with a heart resting in his right hand, for the University Museum of Natural History in Oxford (1864); Charles II, accompanied by a spaniel, for the Palace of Westminster (1869; now in the Old Bailey); and Sir Joshua Reynolds for a garden designed by James Knowles in London's Leicester Square (1874). 1862 also saw a return to Canterbury to produce the tomb effigy of the late Archbishop John Bird Sumner.

His most ambitious later work is the allegorical work Manufactures (1864–70), one of four marble groups depicting the industrial arts, for the London Albert Memorial by George Gilbert Scott. Although Weekes was not on Queen Victoria's original list of sculptors, being selected to work on the project only after John Gibson declined to participate, his group occupies the preferable south side of the finished monument. A central female figure holds an hourglass, symbolising the critical nature of time to industry, while an ironworker stands at his anvil and a potter and weaver offer their wares.

== Lectures and writings ==
In his role as professor of sculpture to the Academy, Weekes delivered a series of eighteen lectures which were published posthumously as Lectures on Art, with a biographical introduction by his son, John Ernest Weekes. Art historian Benedict Read described the Lectures as "the most consistent and intelligent exposition of sculptural thinking in the Victorian era". In addition to conventional topics such as composition, beauty, style, taste, idealism versus realism, portraiture and Greek sculpture, Weekes devoted three lectures of the series to Sir Joshua Reynolds, and one to John Gibson and his mentors, William Behnes and Sir Francis Chantrey. He advised students to become "thinking men", but also advocated a practical approach to learning, "with the modelling tool in hand, and the clay to operate upon".

His gold-medal-winning essay was also published in 1852. Described in a contemporary review as "thoroughly practical", it includes an exposition of the technical aspects of casting in bronze and carving in marble.

== Works ==
=== Sculptures ===
Sculptures by Weekes include:

- Sundial base, Dane John Garden, Canterbury, Kent (1829)
- Bust of George Harris, Baron Harris of Seringapatam and Mysore (1834)
- Bust of Stephen Rumbold Lushington (1834)
- Statue of James Lushington, St George's Cathedral, Madras (1836)
- Monument to George Brodrick, 4th Viscount Midleton, with figure and Perpendicular tracery, Church of St Nicholas, Peper Harow, Surrey (1836)
- Bust of Queen Victoria (1838)
- Statues in Caen stone of Thomas Cranmer, Hugh Latimer and Nicholas Ridley for the Martyrs' Memorial, Oxford (1841)
- Equestrian bronze of the Duke of Wellington, Royal Exchange, London; completed work by Francis Chantrey (1841–4)
- Bust of John Wordsworth, son of Christopher Wordsworth and great-nephew of William Wordsworth, Trinity College Chapel, Cambridge (c. 1841)
- Bust of Zachary Macaulay with medallion depicting the kneeling figure of a slave, Westminster Abbey, London (1842)
- Bronze of Lord Auckland, originally in Calcutta, now in Municipal Building, Auckland, New Zealand (1844)
- Statue of Richard Wellesley, 1st Marquess Wellesley, Indian Office, London (1845)
- Seated Francis Bacon, Trinity College, Cambridge (1845)
- Monument to John Dent, St George's Cathedral, Madras (c. 1845)
- Memorial tablet with figure to Elizabeth Burnell, in marble and slate, Church of St Thomas à Becket, Sheffield, South Yorkshire (1846)
- Marble bust of an elderly lady, possibly the Countess of Dunmore (1848)
- Monument to Samuel Whitbread and Lady Elizabeth Whitbread, Cardington, Bedfordshire (1849)
- Bust of Sir George Gipps, Governor of New South Wales, in Roman garb, Canterbury Cathedral (c. 1849)
- The Suppliant (1850)
- Charity (1850)
- Memorial tablet to Prince Adolphus, Duke of Cambridge with bust and portraits of two orphans, Beddington Place, Wallington, Greater London (1850)
- Resting after a Run, also known as Girl with the Hoop, marble figure (1850/1)
- Monument to Robert Elwes, Church of St Andrew, Great Billing, Northamptonshire (1852)
- Monument to Percy Bysshe Shelley and Mary Wollstonecraft Shelley, Christchurch Priory, Dorset (1853/4)
- The Young Naturalist, in various versions, one at the Royal Society, Dublin, Ireland (1854)
- Master Beaufoy, marble (1855)
- Marble bust of a gentleman (1855)
- Marble bust of a young man (1856)
- Bust of William Buckland, Westminster Abbey, London (c. 1856)
- The Mother's Kiss, 1858
- Marble monument to Captain Thomas Pedder, who died at the Relief of Lucknow, Church of St Andrew, Preston, Lancashire (c. 1858)
- Bust of Mary Seacole, Getty Center, Los Angeles, USA (1859)
- Marble bust of William Buckland, Natural History Museum, London (1860)
- Sardanapalus, Egyptian Hall, Mansion House, London (1861)
- Bust of Joseph Goodall, Eton (before 1862)
- Bust of Sir Robert Peel (before 1862)
- Bust of Sir Thomas Buxton, 1st Baronet (before 1862)
- Marble bust of Joseph Henry Green, President of the Royal College of Surgeons (1863)
- Statue of John Hunter, Royal College of Surgeons, London (1864)
- Statue in Caen stone of William Harvey, University Museum of Natural History, Oxford (1864)
- Monument to William Whitmore, St Andrew's Church, Quatt, Shropshire (1864)
- Manufactures, Albert Memorial, London (1864–70)
- Stone sculpture of William Mulready, Tate (1866)
- Luna, Royal Museum, Canterbury, Kent (1866)
- Busts of Sir Randolph Crewe and Nathaniel Crew, 3rd Baron Crew, Crewe Hall, Cheshire (c. 1866–70)
- Stone sculpture of Thomas Stothard, Tate (1868)
- Charles II, Central Criminal Court, Old Bailey, London (1869)
- Marble bust of George Jones, RA, Royal Academy (1870)
- Marble bust of Sir Roderick Impey Murchison, Royal Society of Edinburgh (1871)
- Marble bust of Doctor Mead, St Thomas' Hospital, London (1871)
- Marble bust of John Flint South, St Thomas' Hospital, London (1872)
- Limestone bust of Sir Joshua Reynolds, Leicester Square, London (1874)
- Marble bust of Edmund Hammond, Foreign Office, London (1874)
- Statues of John Flaxman and Raphael, Burlington House, London (1874)
- Statues of Thomas Linacre, William Harvey and Thomas Sydenham, Royal College of Physicians, London (1876)
- Stone sculpture of John Flaxman, Tate (date unknown)
- Marble bust of William Cheselden, St Thomas' Hospital, London (date unknown)
- Bust of John Locke, Northwestern University, Evanston, USA (date unknown)

=== Writings ===
- The Prize Treatise on the Fine Arts Section of the Great Exhibition of 1851 (1852)
- Lectures on Art (1880)
