= Showmen's Guild of Great Britain =

Trade association based in the United Kingdom

The Showmen's Guild of Great Britain exists to protect the interests of Travelling Showmen in Great Britain.

The Showmen's Guild was founded as the United Kingdom Van Dwellers Protection Association in 1889 in Salford. The formation of the guild was the main turning point of Showmen identifying their lifestyle as a culture rather than an occupation, leading to the idea of Travelling Showmen being a cultural group.

Due to being an insular community, most marriages being within the community, their own language (called Polari), their own traditions and customs, and long lineages within the community, most Showmen identify as being part of their own unique cultural group. Due to travelling about, the average British Showman has a mix of English, Scottish, Welsh and/or Irish heritage. Lots have partial Romani (mainly Romanichal) and partial Irish Traveller heritage too, but despite this, Showmen developed as a group separately to both Irish Travellers and Romanichal Travellers, and their roots, cultures, traditions and identity are separate and distinct.

In 1917, the Showmen's Guild of Great Britain, as it became known, was recognised as the trade association for the travelling funfair business. It acquired the right to represent the business at local and national levels. It exists to promote and protect the Showmen's way of life and to preserve the unique cultural heritage of travelling fairs and circuses.

The Guild has a code of rules and also makes representations concerning proposed legislation when appropriate. It has a membership of around 4,700 people and is organized into ten regional sections. As of 2024, its General Secretary is Joe Mercer who is also Secretary to the Association of Circus Proprietors. It supports the National Fairground Archive, set up in 1994 at the University of Sheffield. The Showmen's Guild organizes fairs, such as St Giles' Fair in Oxford, co-organized with the Oxford City Council.
