= Martyrs' Memorial, Oxford =

Memorial in Oxfordshire, England

Coordinates: 51.75509°N 1.25901°W

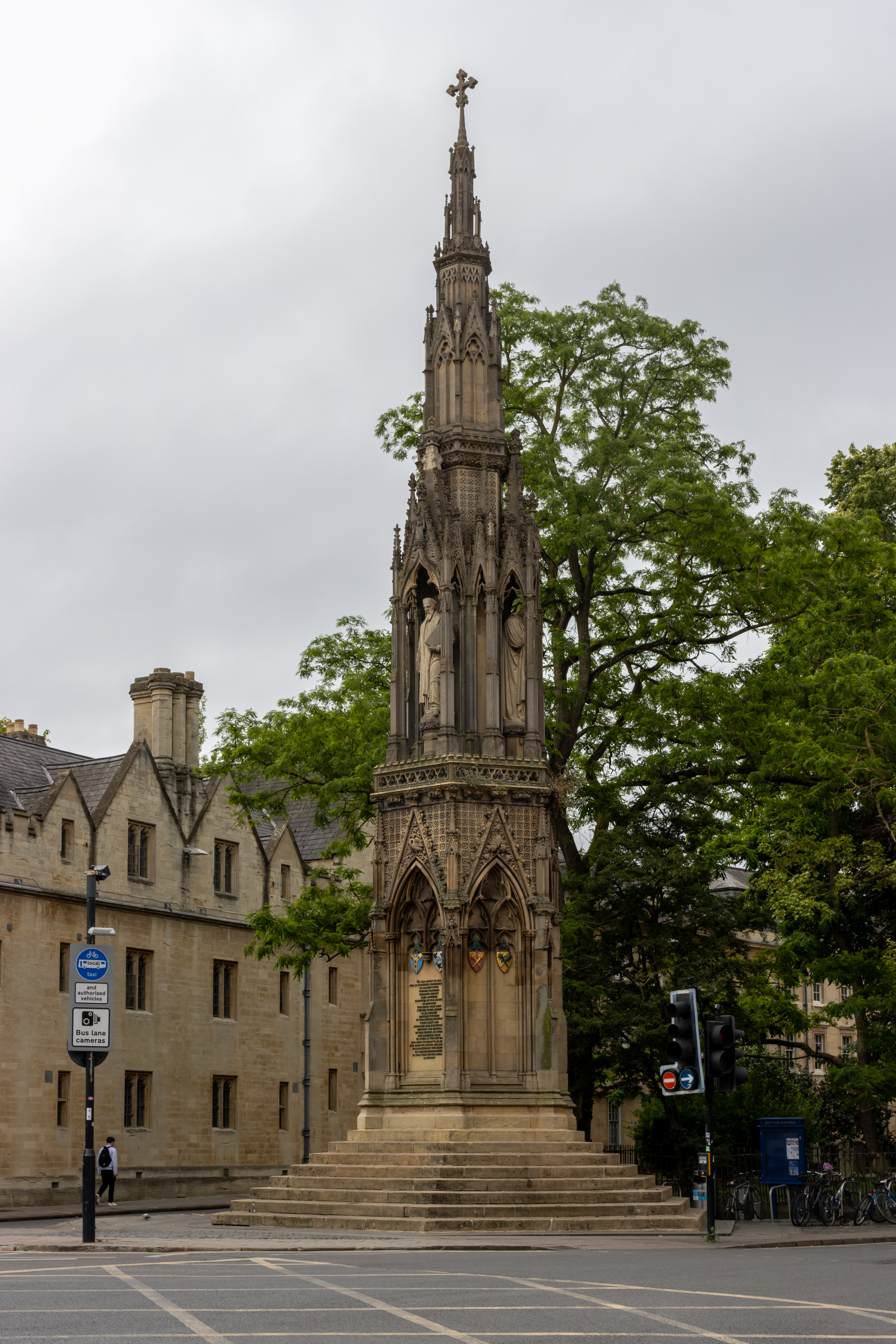
Martyrs' Memorial, Oxford

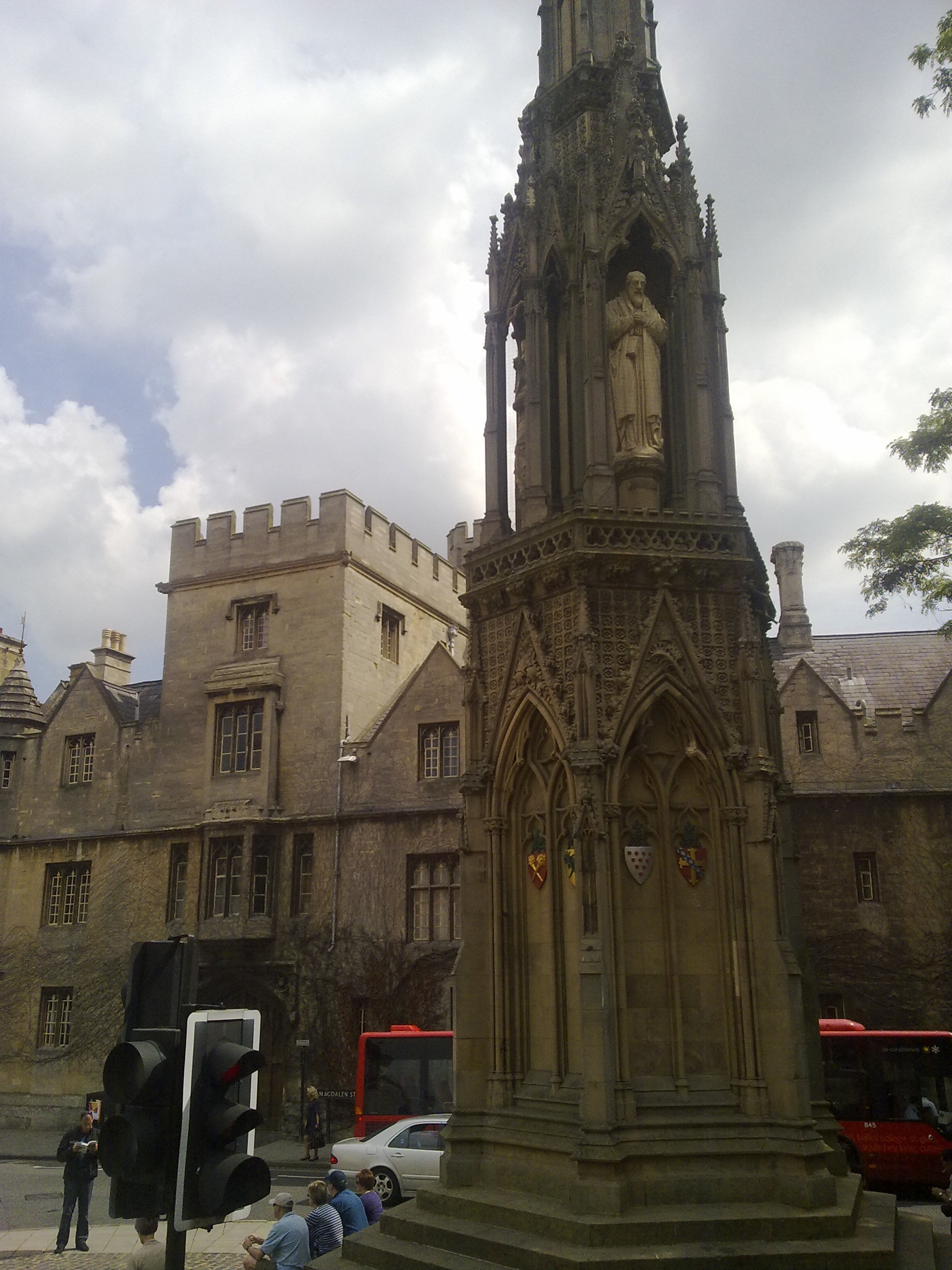
The Martyrs' Memorial, looking back towards Balliol College from Magdalen Street

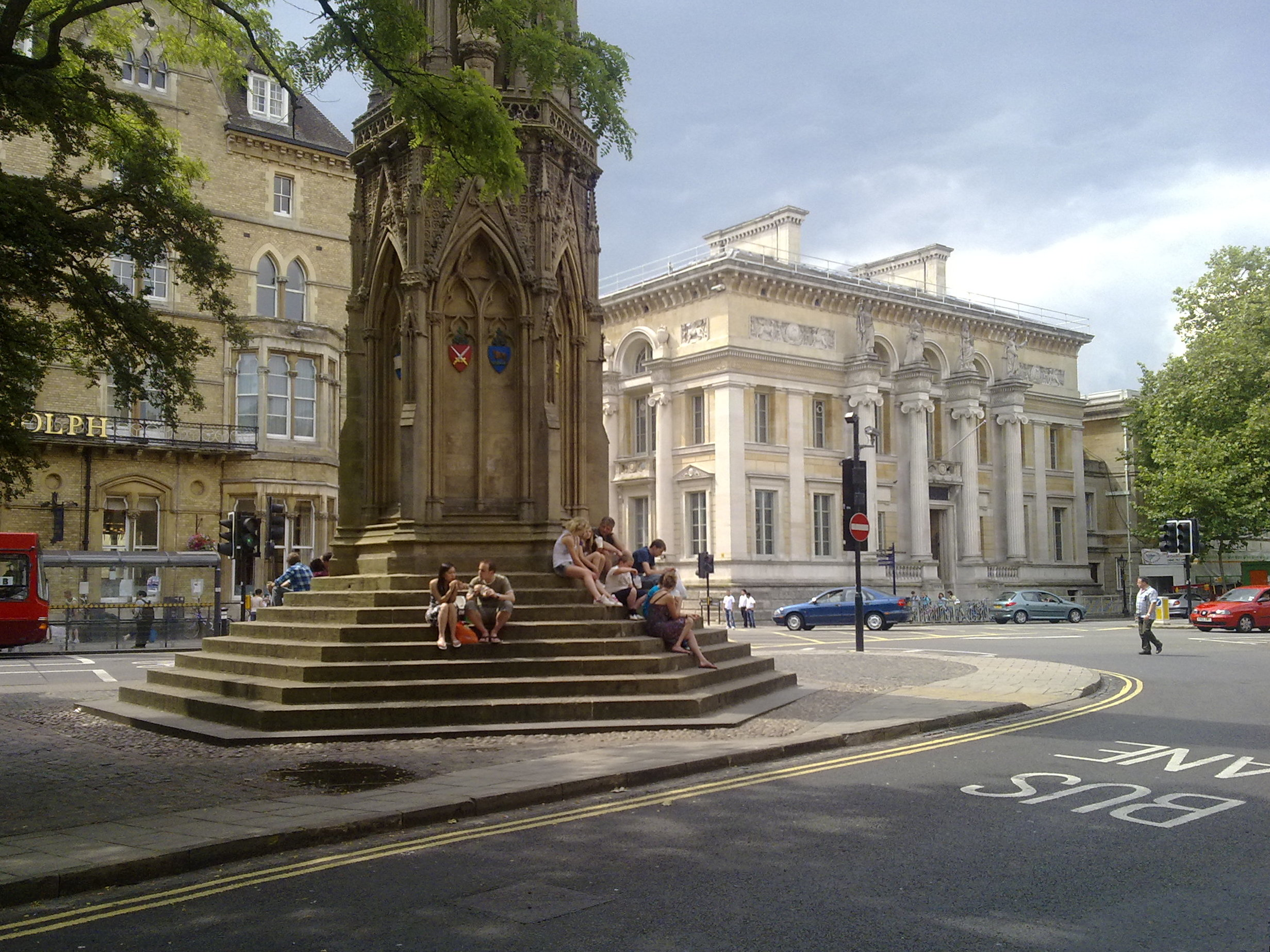
The lower section of the Martyrs' Memorial, looking towards the Taylor Institution

The Martyrs' Memorial is a stone monument positioned at the intersection of St Giles', Magdalen Street and Beaumont Street, to the west of Balliol College, Oxford, England. It commemorates the 16th-century Oxford Martyrs.

== History ==
The monument was built 300 years after the events of the English Reformation and commemorates the Bishop of Worcester, Hugh Latimer, and Bishop of London, Nicholas Ridley, who were burned nearby on 16 October 1555 after having been convicted for heresy because of their Protestant beliefs after a quick trial. It also commemorates the former archbishop of Canterbury Thomas Cranmer, who was similarly executed (after having watched his colleagues' painful deaths while imprisoned in a nearby tower and the Vatican having permitted his degradation from holy orders in February) on 21 March 1556. The Rev. Charles Pourtales Golightly (a descendant of Huguenots who fled to England in that earlier era) and other Anglican clergy raised the funds to erect the monument during the Victorian era. They opposed the 19th-century Oxford Movement (also known as the Tractarian Movement), led by John Keble, John Henry Newman and others. Golightly and his colleagues were alarmed at the Anglo-Catholic realignment the movement was bringing into the Church of England, and wanted the memorial to reflect the university's Protestant profession and anti-Catholic tradition.

== Description ==
Designed by George Gilbert Scott, the monument was completed in 1843 after two years' work, having replaced "a picturesque but tottering old house". The Victorian Gothic memorial, whose design dates from 1838, has been likened to the steeple of a cathedral, though it was consciously patterned on the Eleanor crosses erected by King Edward I between 1290 and 1294 to the memory of his wife, Queen Eleanor of Castile (1241–1290). Henry Weekes sculpted the three statues of Cranmer, Latimer and Ridley. The statues are carved from Caen stone while the monument itself is made of Magnesian limestone. The monument is listed at Grade II*.

The inscription on the base of the Martyrs' Memorial reads:

To the Glory of God, and in grateful commemoration of His servants, Thomas Cranmer, Nicholas Ridley, Hugh Latimer, Prelates of the Church of England, who near this spot yielded their bodies to be burned, bearing witness to the sacred truths which they had affirmed and maintained against the errors of the Church of Rome, and rejoicing that to them it was given not only to believe in Christ, but also to suffer for His sake; this monument was erected by public subscription in the year of our Lord God, MDCCCXLI [1841].

Cuthbert Bede (in his novel The Adventures of Mr Verdant Green) wrote about the setting of the Martyrs' Memorial thus in 1853:

He who enters the city, as Mr Green did, from the Woodstock Road, and rolls down the shady avenue of St Giles', between St John's College and the Taylor Buildings, and past the graceful Martyrs' Memorial, will receive impressions such as probably no other city in the world could convey.

The actual execution site is close by in Broad Street, just outside the line of the old city walls. The site is marked by an iron cross sunk in the road.

== Current condition ==
The Memorial deteriorated during the 20th century, but underwent a full restoration in 2002, as part of the 75th anniversary of the Oxford Preservation Trust. The Oxford Preservation Trust opened a public fundraising campaign in April 2001, and subsequently cleaned the memorial, repainted the heraldic shields, and reshaped and replaced the incomplete and missing statues. The restored monument was unveiled in January 2003.

Popular rumour is that in the past students have misled foreign tourists about the nature of the Memorial and convinced them it was the spire of an underground church, which could be toured for a modest fee. This would result in the tourists venturing down a nearby flight of stairs which actually led to the public toilets.

== See also ==
- Christian martyrs
- Religion in the United Kingdom
- Oxford Spanish Civil War memorial
