= Cakewalk (fairground ride) =

Fairground ride

A cakewalk, perhaps named after the cakewalk dance, is a type of fairground ride in which participants try to walk along an undulating walkway.

The cakewalk was introduced in the United Kingdom around 1909. Its two walkways move both up and down and backwards and forwards, making it difficult to stay upright.
