= St Giles', Oxford =

Wide boulevard in central Oxford, UK

Coordinates: 51.7569°N 1.2597°W

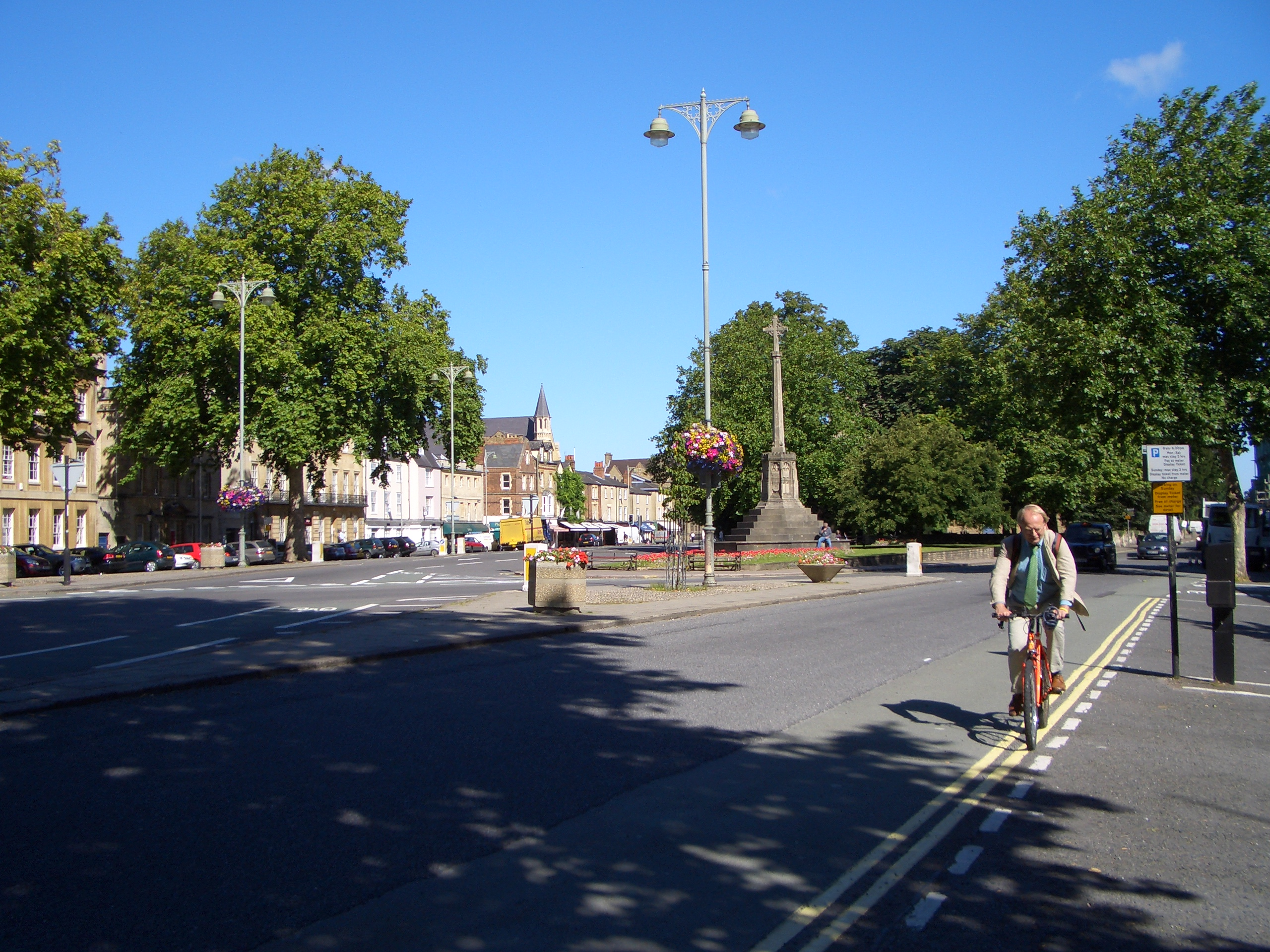
St Giles' at the point where it divides into Woodstock Road (left) and Banbury Road (right) to the north.

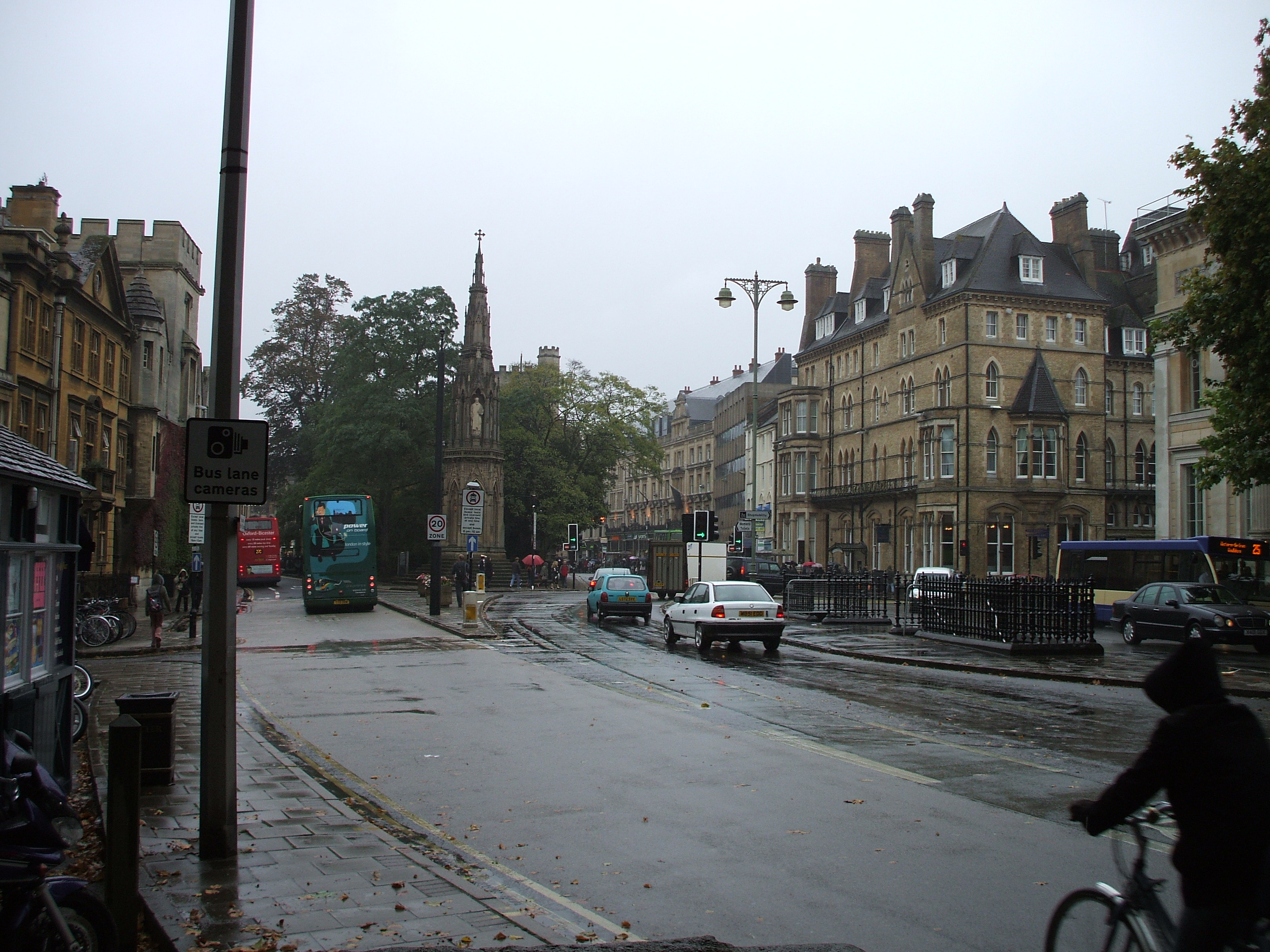
Southern end of St Giles' Street outside the west entrance to Balliol College.

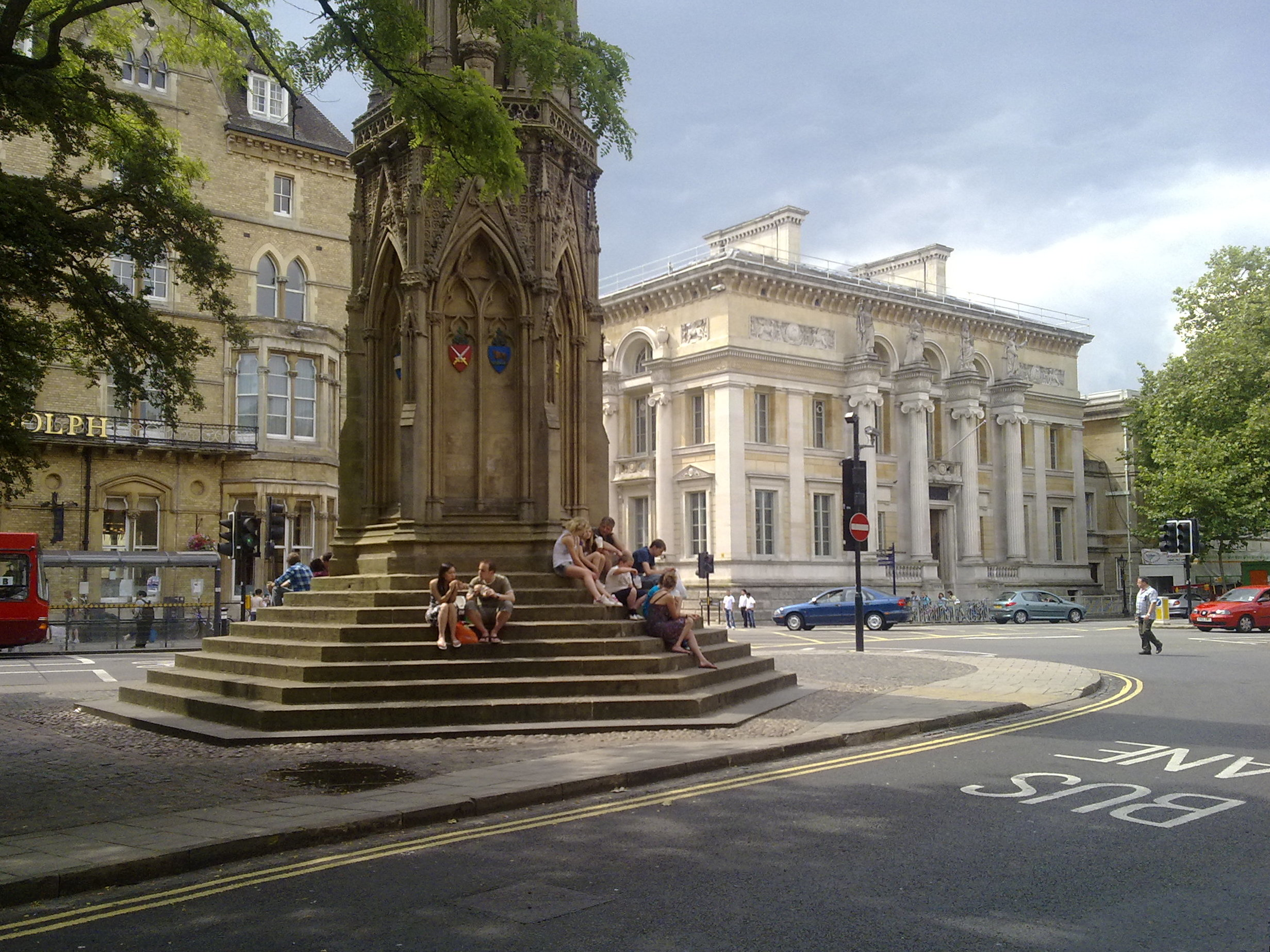
View of Martyrs' Memorial at the southern end of St Giles' with the Macdonald Randolph Hotel and Taylor Institution Library behind.

St Giles' is a wide boulevard leading north from the centre of Oxford, England. At its northern end, the road divides into Woodstock Road to the left and Banbury Road to the right, both major roads through North Oxford. At the southern end, the road continues as Magdalen Street at the junction with Beaumont Street to the west. Also to the west halfway along the street is Pusey Street. Like the rest of North Oxford, much of St Giles' is owned by St John's College.

== Church ==
At the northern end of St Giles' is St Giles' Church, whose churchyard includes the main War Memorial. The church originates from the 12th century.

== Other buildings and structures ==
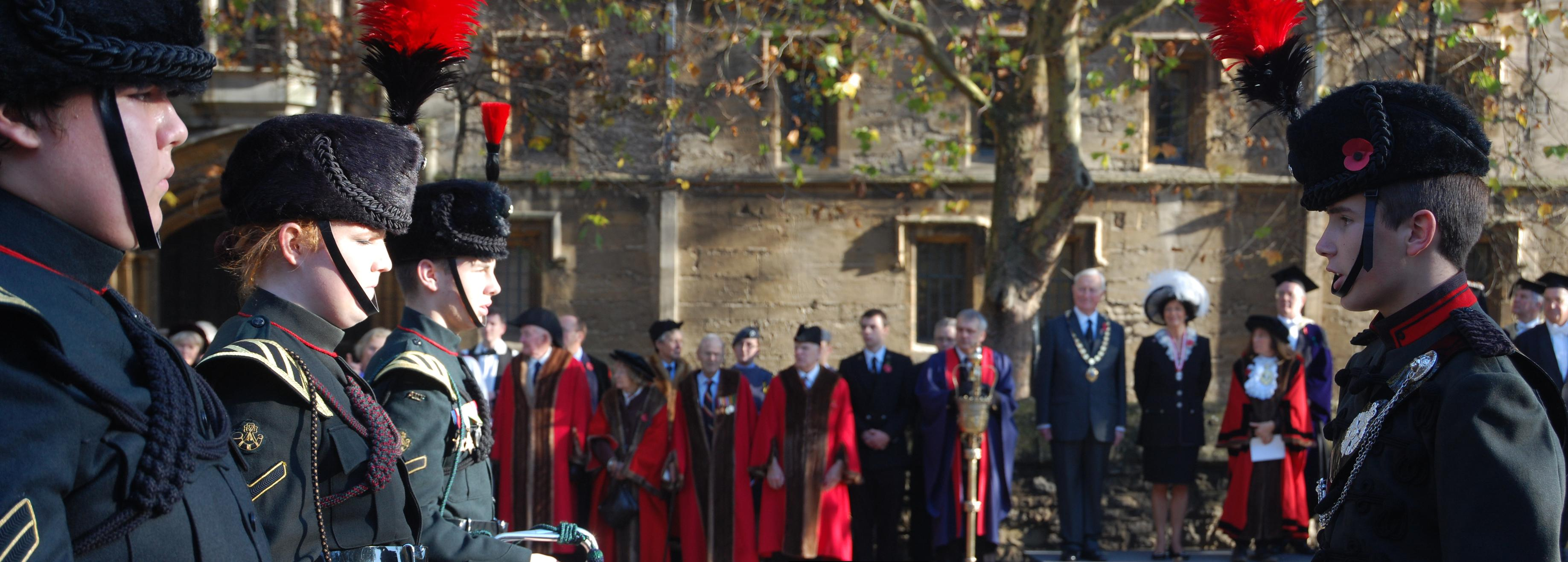
The Remembrance Sunday in 2011.

Working from north to south, on the east side are the Lamb & Flag public house (formerly a coaching inn), St John's College, Trinity College, and Balliol College. On the west side are the International Study Centre of d'Overbroeck's College, St Benet's Hall, the Theology Faculty, Oxford Quaker Meeting House, the Eagle and Child public house (where J. R. R. Tolkien, C. S. Lewis, and other members of the Inklings met; No. 42 was the register office where Lewis contracted a civil marriage in 1956 to Joy Davidman) and is now a dental practice, Regent's Park College (Principal's Lodgings and Senior Tutor's house), Pusey House and St Cross College, Blackfriars, and the Taylor Institution, behind which is the Ashmolean Museum (with its main entrance in Beaumont Street). The southern end meets Magdalen Street at the Martyrs' Memorial (1843), commemorating the Oxford Martyrs (1555–56).

Balliol Hall used to stand on the east side of St Giles' at the point that the Banbury Road and Woodstock Road divide. It was in rooms here that lessons began under A. E. Clarke in September 1877 at a school that was to become known as the Dragon School. The school expanded and moved within two years to Crick Road and then in 1895 to its current location in Bardwell Road in North Oxford.

St Giles' Fair, 2007.

== Fair ==
The street is closed to traffic for two days each September for the traditional St Giles' Fair. Formerly, the University Parks was also closed to demonstrate that they are owned by the University of Oxford rather than formally being public. Their closure date is now Christmas Eve.

== Gallery ==
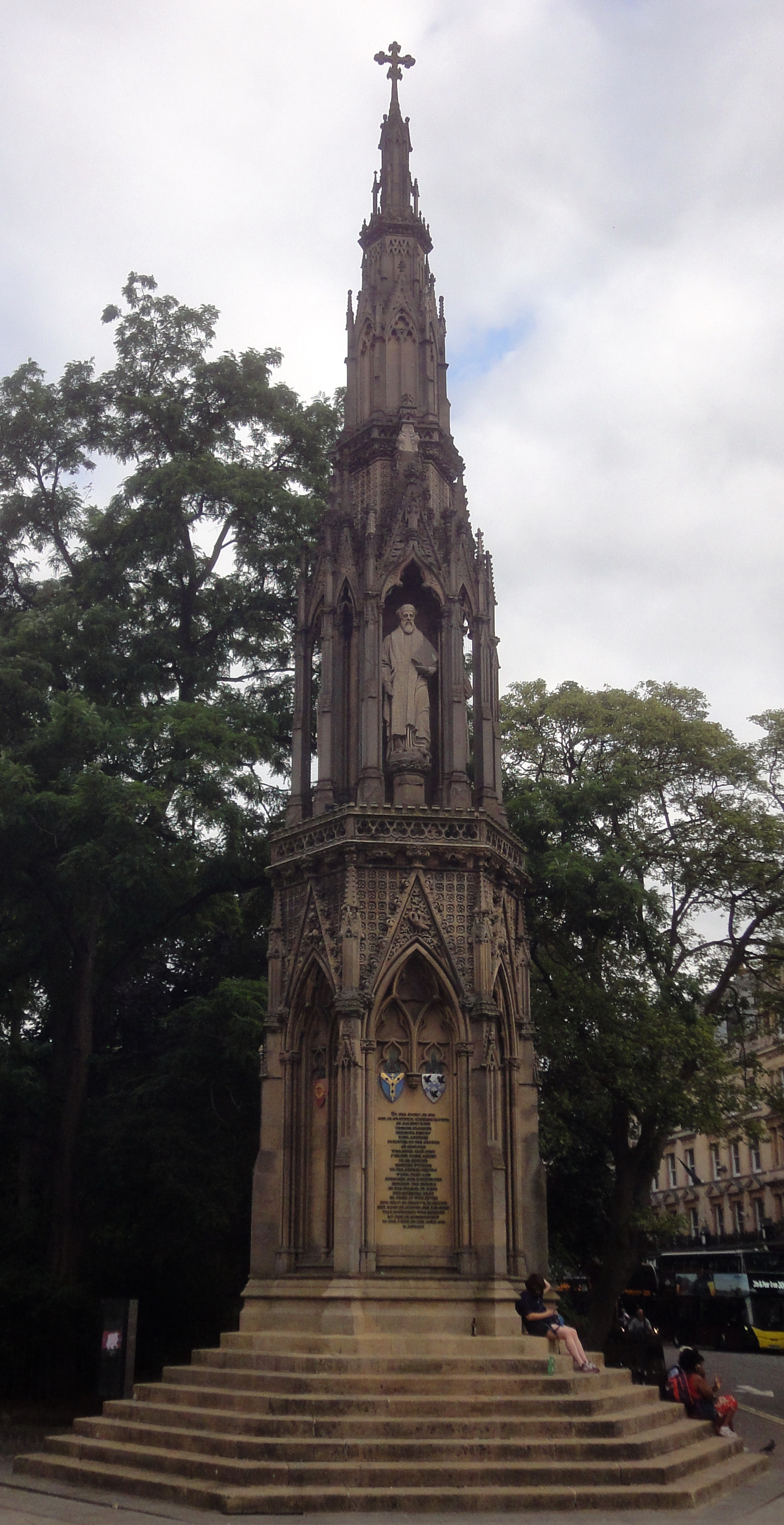
The Martyrs' Memorial at the southern end of St Giles'.

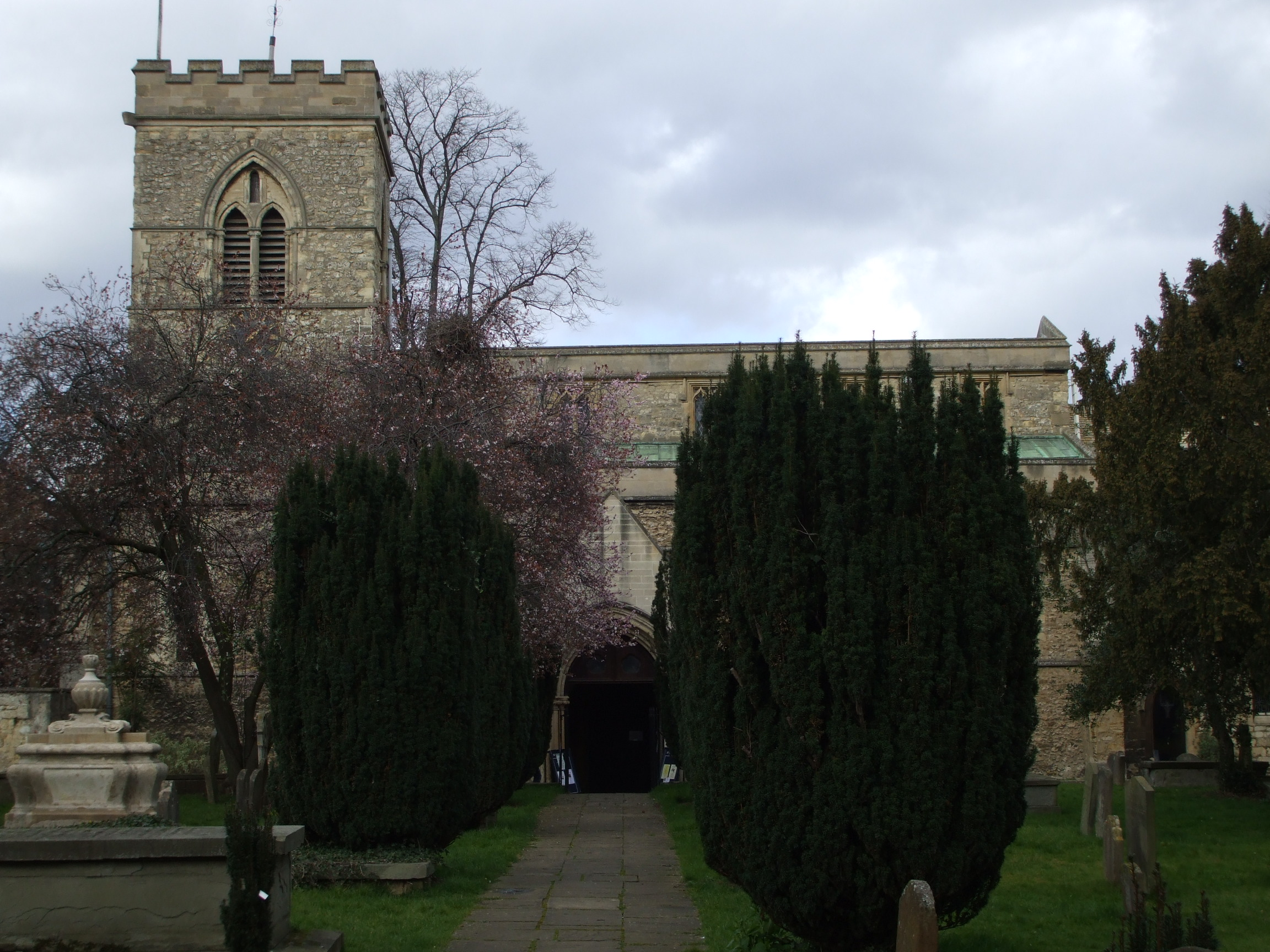
St Giles' Church, looking north from the churchyard.

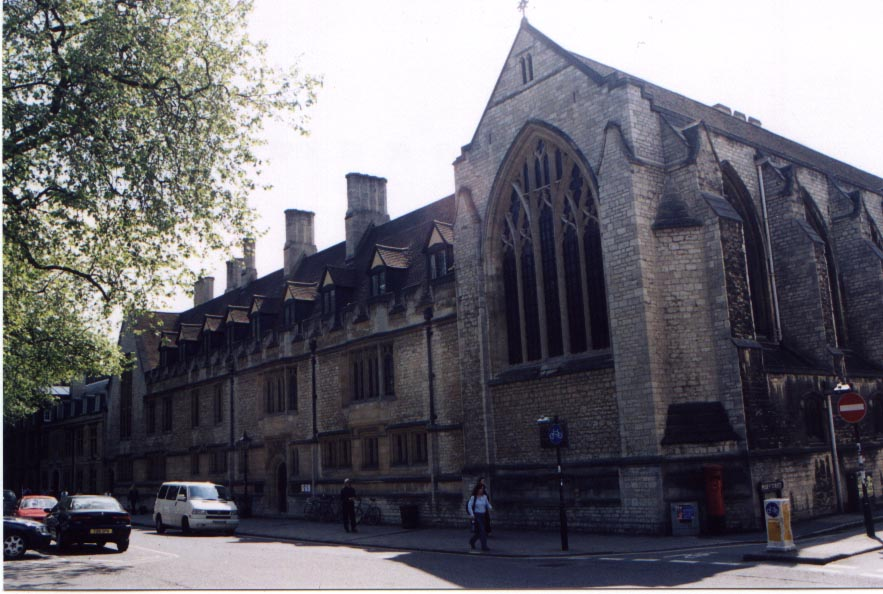
Pusey House on the west side of St Giles'.

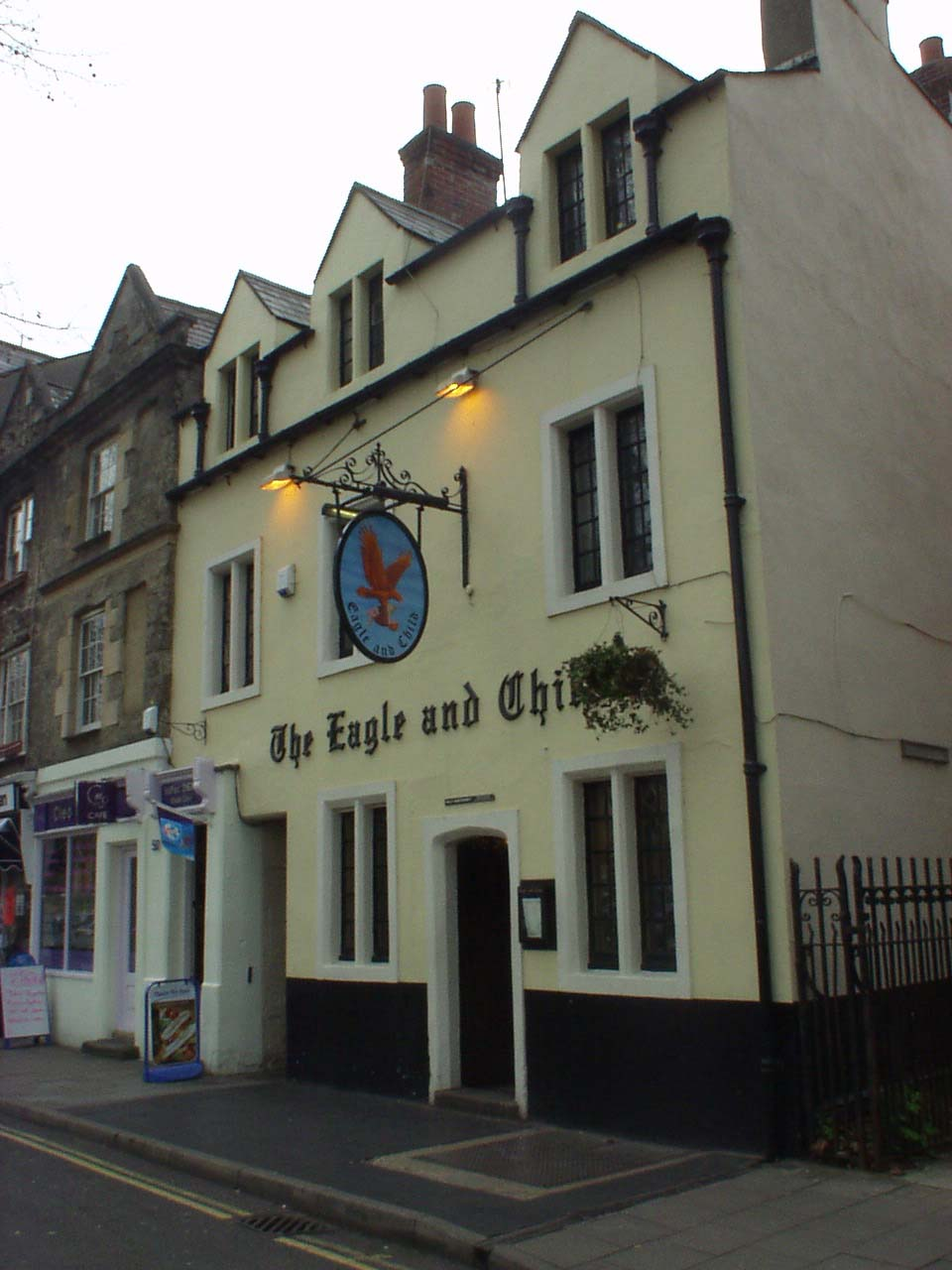
The Eagle and Child public house, also on the west side of St Giles'.
