= Taylor Institution =

Library

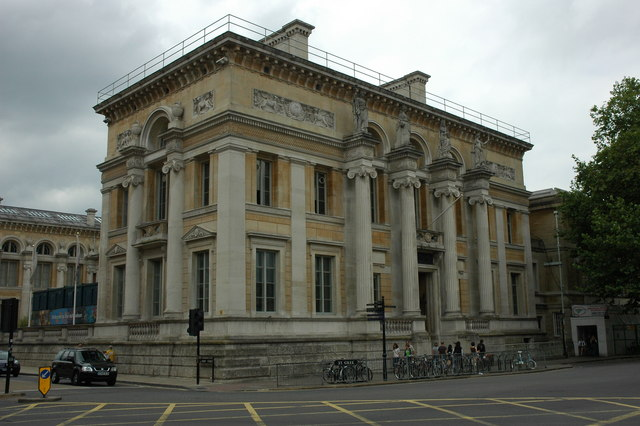
- The Taylor Institution building seen from near the Martyrs' Memorial
- 51.7554°N 1.2600°W
- Location: St Giles', Oxford, United Kingdom
- Type: Academic library
- Established: 1845; 181 years ago

Other information
- Director: James Legg
- Website: Taylor Institution Library

Location of the Institution in central Oxford

The Taylor Institution (commonly known as the Taylorian) is the Oxford University library dedicated to the study of the languages of Europe. Its building also includes lecture rooms used by the Faculty of Medieval and Modern Languages, University of Oxford. Since 1889, an Annual Lecture on a subject of Foreign Literature has been given at the Taylorian Institution.

== History ==
The Taylor Institution was established in 1845, funded largely by a bequest from the estate of the notable architect Sir Robert Taylor (1714–1788). At the time, Modern European languages were not taught at the University; it was not until 1903 that the Medieval and Modern Languages Faculty and Honours School was instituted in Oxford. Since the Bodleian Library lacked space, the Taylorian was initially used to house things as varied as Stubbs's lectures on English history and the Hope collection of butterflies.

== Description ==
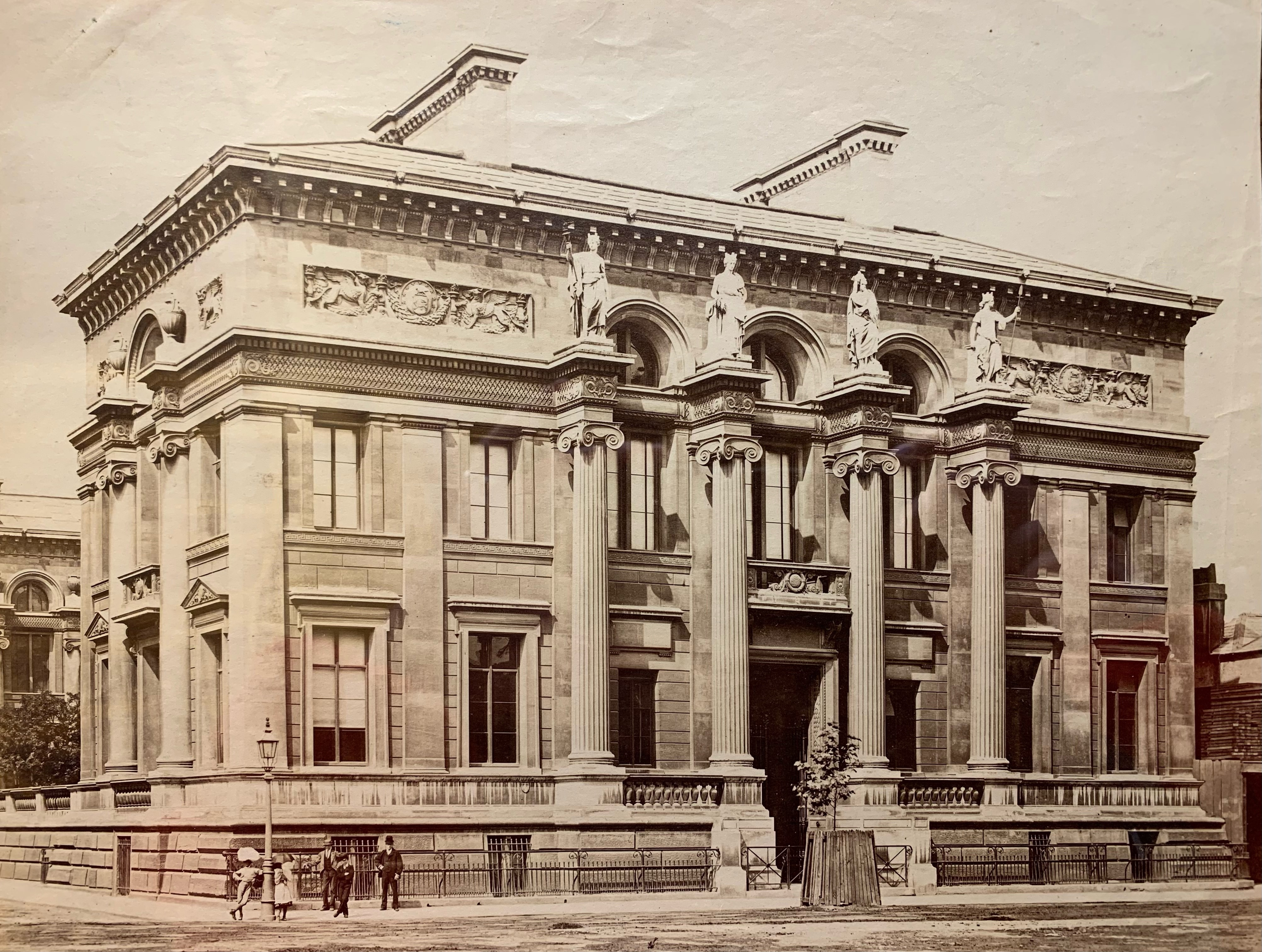
The Taylorian in the 1880s, Oxford, Bodleian Libraries, University Archives, TL 5/11. At the basement level, the entrance to the librarians' flat is visible.

The institution and its library are found in the east wing of a neo-classical building at the southern end of St Giles'. It was designed by Charles Cockerell to accommodate the institution and the University Galleries (now the Ashmolean Museum) and opened in 1845. The building was extended to the north along St Giles' to designs by T.H. Hughes in 1931 and 1938.

The library serves, for the greater part, those studying for the degree of Bachelor of Arts, for the various Master's degrees, and for the DPhil at Oxford University. The collections include Modern European languages, among them French, German, Italian, Spanish, and Portuguese languages (including the South American Spanish language and the Brazilian Portuguese language) with a total of around five hundred thousand volumes. The Greek and Slavonic collections consist of European languages found further eastward, including the Greek, Slavic (including Russian), Uralic, and Albanian languages.

The library holds many world-class collections. Its holdings in German were started by Max Müller, who brought many publications from Germany, among them many of Martin Luther's Flugschriften, including the first edition of his Sendbrief vom Dolmetschen, and go up to contemporary German literature. Italian works run from Dante and Tasso through one of the largest collections of Giovanni Battista Guarini's seminal Il Pastor fido to Foscolo and Futurist manifestos. The Spanish and Portuguese collections contain early editions of Lope de Vega, Camoens, Cervantes, Góngora, Quevedo, and Calderón. Russian first editions are well represented. The library's greatest strength, however, lies in its French holdings. Its collection of French Enlightenment authors stars the only complete collection in the world of all the French editions of Voltaire's Candide printed in 1759, the year of first publication. The Taylorian also owns one of the only two known copies of the first edition of Benjamin Constant's Adolphe. The collections include a lock of Goethe's hair.

== See also ==
- Ashmolean Museum
- Bodleian Library
- Taylor Professor of the German Language and Literature
