= Edward Bowles =

Edward Bowles may refer to:

- Edward Augustus Bowles (1865–1954), English horticulturalist
- Edward Bowles (minister) (1613–1662), English Presbyterian minister
- Edward M. Bowles (1871–1896), American college football player and coach
- Edward L. Bowles, electrical engineer and U.S. military science advisor
