= Frederick Herbert Crossley =

British wood carver (1868–1955)

Frederick Herbert Crossley FSA (2 August 1868 – 6 January 1955), known as Fred Crossley or Fred H. Crossley, was a British wood carver, designer and an authority on Medieval English architecture, church furnishings and also timberwork. Together with Thomas Rayson, he designed the Chester War Memorial in the grounds of Chester Cathedral, and later worked on the restoration of the Cathedral Refectory, designing and overseeing the installation of its new roof. Crossley published extensively and, in 1946, a study of Welsh rood screens he undertook in conjunction with Maurice Ridgway was awarded the G. T. Clark prize.

== Early life and education ==
Crossley was born in Yorkshire in 1868, moving to Cheshire in 1887. He started his working career as a farm apprentice near Knutsford but, after taking local courses in wood carving, he gave up farming and pursued this interest for the rest of his life. He attended the Manchester School of Art during the 1890s undertaking further studies in wood carving, drawing and design.

== Career and legacy ==
In 1898 Crossley was appointed a teacher of drawing and wood carving by Cheshire County Council. He also undertook commissions for wood carvings and examples of his work can be seen in various churches in Cheshire at Over Peover, Bunbury and Plemstall, as well as the great roof of the Refectory at Chester Cathedral. His research work for his writings was not limited to Cheshire but took him all over England and Wales and resulted in numerous books and articles that are still referenced, for example, a 2019 article published online, The Medieval Rood Screen and Rood Loft at Llananno by Richard Wheeler makes reference to the series of articles published by Crossley & Ridgway in Archaeologia Cambrensis between 1943 and 1962.

In Crossley's obituary for the Historic Society of Lancashire and Cheshire, the author, Percy Culverwell Brown, refers to the fact that Crossley became an "ardent photographer" and, in the obituary for The Antiquaries Journal, he is described as "easily the finest photographer of architectural detail of his time". Not only did Crossley use his photographs, together with plans and drawings he executed, in his books and articles, but was generous in making prints available to students. In 1932 he donated his large collection of negatives, totalling some 10,000, to The Courtauld Institute of Art in London where his photographs are held in the Conway Library. The importance of this collection and the significance of Crossley's contribution is cited by Fellow of the Society of Antiquaries of London, Charles Tracy, in the Society's journal Salon 219 dated February 14, 2020:

The Conway Library is a unique visual cultural map of Europe from the early Middle Ages to the present day. In this digital era, some may think that it is no longer needed, but they are profoundly wrong. In my own field of church woodwork, the superb black and white photographs of Fred Crossley, to name but one early twentieth-century executant, constitute an invaluable record of the state of our church furnishings eight or so decades ago...

Plans and photographs by Crossley are held in other archives and collections, for example by the National Trust and in the Wellcome Collection and photographs, by Crossley and his co-author Maurice Ridgway, of stained glass, rood screens and roofs of North Wales and border churches are held in North East Wales Archives.

== Honours and appointments to public bodies ==
- Fellow of the Society of Antiquaries of London (elected 1911).
- Member of the Historic Society of Lancashire and Cheshire from 1915. Made Honorary Member in 1946.
- Member of the Chester Archaeological Society from 1916 and member of the council from 1920.
- Served on the Chester, Liverpool and Lichfield diocesan committees for the repair of churches, as well as on the London Central Council and the Northern Provincial Committee for the care of churches.

== Selected publications ==
- English Church Woodwork: a study in craftsmanship during the mediaeval period, A.D. 1250-1550. Text by F. E. Howard & illustrations by F. H. Crossley. London : B. T. Batsford, 1917, Second edition, 1927.
- English Church monuments, A.D. 1150–1550: An introduction to the study of tombs and effigies of the mediaeval period, London : B. T. Batsford, 1921.
- English Abbey: its life and work in the Middle Ages, London : B. T. Batsford, 1935 (and later editions)
- 'On the Importance of Fourteenth Century Planning in the Construction of the Churches of Cheshire', in Chester and North Wales Architectural, Archaeological and Historic Society Journal. New series. vol. 32. pt. 1. 1937.
- The Post-Reformation Effigies and Monuments of Cheshire (1550-1800), Historic Society of Lancashire and Cheshire, 1940.
- A Glory That Was England: English Church Craftsmanship, London : B. T. Batsford, 1941.
- An Introduction to the Study of Screens and Lofts in Wales and Monmouthshire, with especial reference to their design, provenance and influence. (pt. 1, 2, 4. By F. H. Crossley. pt. 3, 5–10. By F. H. Crossley and Maurice Hill Ridgway.) in Archaeologia Cambrensis. vol. 97. pt. 2-vol. 99. pt. 2; vol. 100. pt. 2; vol. 102. pt. 1; vol. 106–108. 1943–59. (detail from the British Library catalogue)
- English Church Design 1040–1540 A.D, London : B. T. Batsford, 1945.
- The County Books. Cheshire, London : Robert Hale, 1949. Part of The County Book series.
- Timber Building in England, from early times to the end of the seventeenth century, London : B. T. Batsford, 1951.
- English Church Craftmanship - An Introduction To The Work Of The Medieval Period And Some Account Of Later Developments, United Kingdom : Read Books, 2009 (originally published in 1947) ISBN 9781444655230
