= Oxford War Memorial =

War memorial in Oxford, England

Coordinates: 51°45′30″N 1°15′36″W

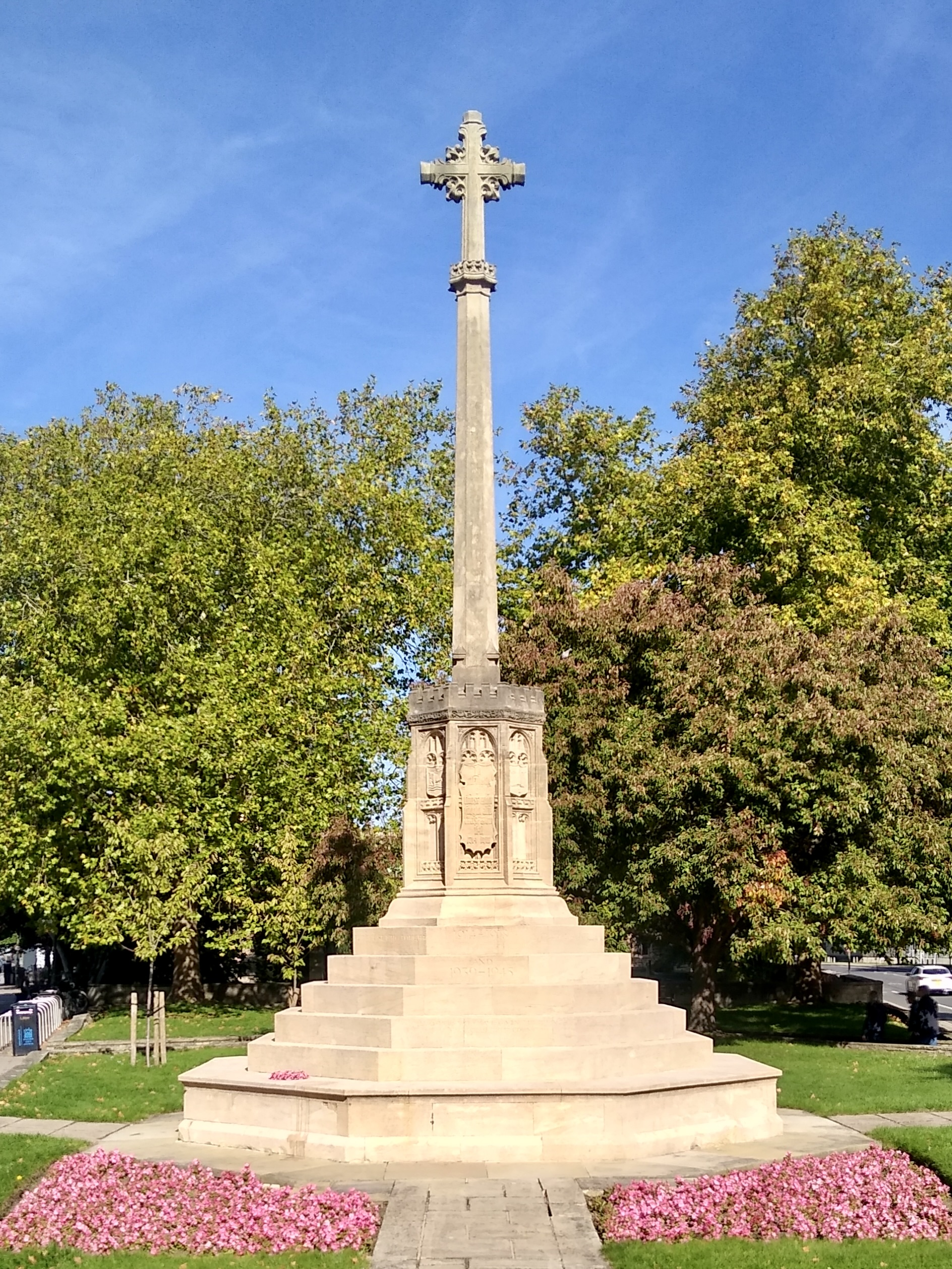
Oxford War Memorial in September 2025

Oxford War Memorial is a First World War memorial in Oxford, at the north end of St Giles', on the junction where the road splits into the A4144 Woodstock Road and the A4165 Banbury Road. The memorial stands in St Giles Memorial Garden, about 150 m (490 ft) to the south of St Giles' Church, Oxford. It was unveiled in 1921 and became a Grade II listed structure in 2016. The Grade II* listed Martyrs' Monument stands about 350 m (1,150 ft) south, at the other end of St Giles'.

The memorial commission selected a design by John Egerton Thorpe, but the work was "worked out" by Gilbert Thomas Francis Gardner and Thomas Rayson; later research suggests the final design is primarily the work of Rayson. Rayson also designed other war memorials in Oxfordshire, including those in Witney and Woodstock, and collaborated with Frederick Crossley on the design for Chester War Memorial. All are based on medieval standing crosses, perhaps the White Cross in Hereford.

It comprises a tall cross, decorated with fleur-de-lys between the angles, on a slender tapering octagonal shaft, mounted on an octagonal plinth, resting on an octagonal base with seven steps – five similar steps, a sixth broader step for wreaths but which may also be used as a seat, and a smaller seventh step. The whole structure is made from Clipsham stone and it stands about 11.4 m (37 ft) high.

The eight faces of the plinth bear carvings within recessed niches. The south face has a carved shield bearing the inscription "IN / MEMORY / OF / THOSE WHO / FOUGHT AND/ THOSE WHO / FELL / 1914–1918". Later added to the second step is the inscription "AND / 1939 – 1945" and on the fourth step: "AND ALL OTHERS WHO HAVE GIVEN THEIR LIVES / IN THE SERVICE OF THEIR COUNTRY". The main inscription on the face of the memorial cross has become worn, and further inscriptions were added to the top step in 2016, adding "FOR THOSE WHO FOUGHT", "1914–1918", "AND THOSE WHO FELL".

The other seven faces of the plinth are carved with shields that depict (clockwise) the coat of arms of the University of Oxford, a bugle (representing the British Army), a cross encircled by a crown of thorns (representing sacrifice), the cross of Saint George (for England), a pair of wings (for the Royal Air Force), an anchor (for the Royal Navy), and the coat of arms of the city of Oxford.

The memorial was constructed for Oxford City Council, at a cost of £1,500, on land to the south of St Giles' Church which was donated by St John's College, Oxford. The stone was carved by Ernest Field of Oxford, and the monument was built by Wooldridge & Simpson of Oxford.

It was unveiled on 13 July 1921 by General Sir Robert Fanshawe, and dedicated by the Bishop of Oxford, Hubert Burge.

== See also ==
- Oxford Spanish Civil War memorial
