= Sutton Packhorse Bridge =

Packhorse Bridge in Sutton, Bedfordshire

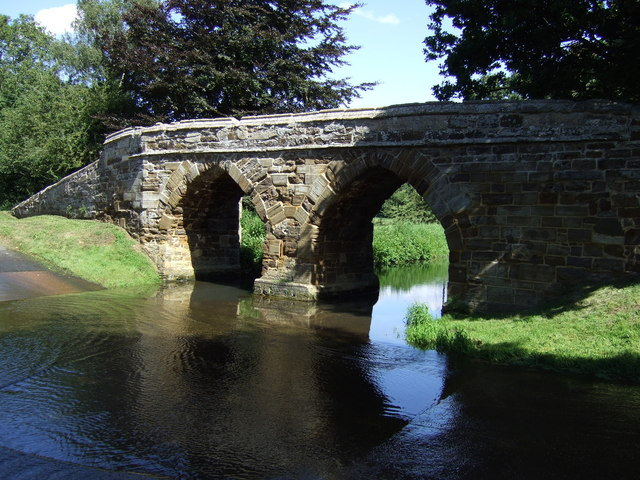
- Sutton Packhorse Bridge, Sutton

- Location within Bedfordshire
- 52°06′42″N 0°13′08″W
- Type: Bridge
- Location: Sutton, Bedfordshire
- OS grid reference: TL2205547415

Site notes
- Elevation: 32 m (105 ft)

Listed Building – Grade II*
- Designated: 31-Oct-1966
- Reference no.: 1321630

Sutton Packhorse Bridge is a Grade-II* listed building in Sutton, Bedfordshire.

== Construction and listed grade ==
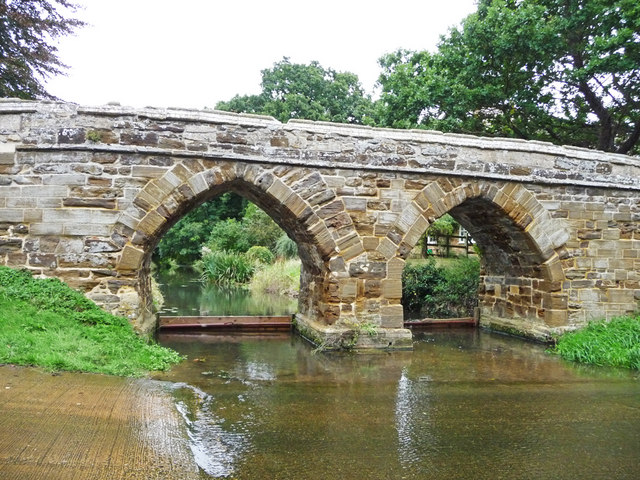
Sutton Packhorse Bridge, a medieval bridge in Sutton, Bedfordshire

Sutton Packhorse Bridge is a Grade-II* listed building in the county of Bedfordshire and its elevation is 32 m (105 ft), it has a length of 40 m (130 ft) and is a two arch construction, made from ironstone in the late 13th century and it crosses the Potton Brook, a tributary of the River Ivel. The narrowness of the bridge meant that only one vehicle could pass through at a time.

== History ==
The bridge was first mentioned in historical records in 1504. The bridge was used as a trade route for wool between the towns of Bedford and Dunstable, and is a general legacy of the "packhorse bridges" of the Medieval period.
