= Oliver Bowles =

English Presbyterian minister and divine (died c. 1646)

Oliver Bowles (died c. 1646) was an English Presbyterian minister and divine.

== Life ==
Bowles was educated at Queens' College, Cambridge, of which he was a Fellow from 1599 to 1606, and tutor to John Preston.

Oliver Bowles, minister of Sutton, was one of the oldest members of the Westminster Assembly. He probably died in or before 1646. However, some sources report that Timothy Cruso was impressed by the dying counsels of Bowles (died 5 September 1674), who advised him never to trouble his hearers "with useless or contending notions, but rather preach all in practicals". His son was the Presbyterian minister Edward Bowles.

== Works ==
He was author of:

1. Zeale for God's House quickned: a Fast Sermon before the Assembly of the Lords, Commons, and Divines, 1643, 4to.
2. De Pastore Evangelico, 1649, 4to; 1655 and 1659, 16mo (published by his son, and dedicated to the Earl of Manchester).

== Sources ==
- Wright, Stephen (2004). "Bowles, Edward (bap. 1613, d. 1662), clergyman". Oxford Dictionary of National Biography (online ed.). Oxford University Press. doi:10.1093/ref:odnb/3068. (Subscription, Wikipedia Library access or UK public library membership required.)

Attribution:

- Gordon, Alexander (1886). "Bowles, Edward" . In Stephen, Leslie (ed.). Dictionary of National Biography. Vol. 6. London: Smith, Elder & Co. pp. 67–68.
- Gordon, Alexander (1888). "Cruso, Timothy" . In Stephen, Leslie (ed.). Dictionary of National Biography. Vol. 13. London: Smith, Elder & Co. pp. 264–265.
- Gordon, Alexander (1896). "Preston, John (1587-1628)" . In Lee, Sidney (ed.). Dictionary of National Biography. Vol. 46. London: Smith, Elder & Co. pp. 308–311.
