= Edward Free =

Edward Drax Free (1764–1843) was an English clergyman.

== Life ==
He was the youngest son of a clergyman, John Free of Newington, Surrey. He matriculated in 1781 at St John's College, Oxford, where he graduated BA in 1785, and MA in 1789; he took the higher degrees BD in 1794, and DD in 1799. He was eventually elected to a Fellowship. He was also appointed Vicar of St Giles' Church, Oxford.

In Oxford Free was at odds with the authorities of his college. He was appointed Rector of the Church of All Saints, Sutton, Bedfordshire in 1808.

It is alleged that Drax stole the lead off his own church roof to sell for scrap. He also impregnated several of his housekeepers, allowed swine to desecrate the graveyard, and had been publicly abusive, both sober and drunk. His downfall came when he attempted to have the churchwarden Montagu Burgoyne fined for non-attendance at church using a law passed during the reign of Elizabeth I. He was removed from his living at the parish in 1830.

Drax died in 1843 when a cart hit him in a road accident.

== See also ==
- Harold Davidson
