= St Giles' Church, Oxford =

Coordinates: 51°45′33″N 1°15′38″W

St Giles' Church
- Parish Church of St Giles
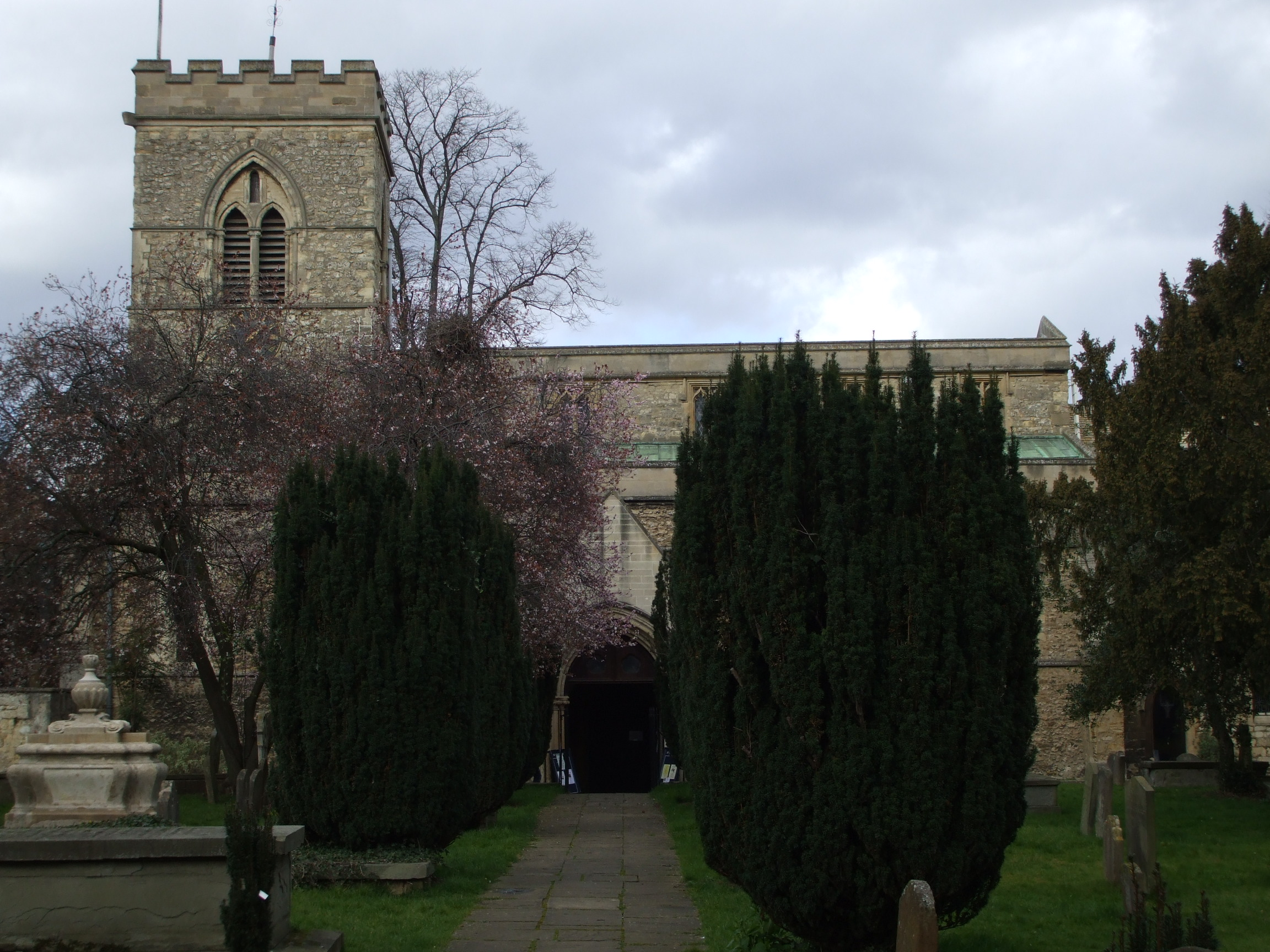
- St Giles' Church, looking north from the churchyard
- St Giles' Church
- OS grid reference: SP 51139 06982
- Location: St Giles', Oxford
- Country: England
- Denomination: Church of England
- Website: Welcome to St Giles Oxford

History
- Founder(s): Edwin, son of Godegose
- Dedication: Saint Giles
- Consecrated: 1200

Architecture
- Style: Norman, Early English Gothic, Decorated Gothic
- Years built: 1120; 906 years ago

Administration
- Province: Canterbury
- Diocese: Oxford
- Archdeaconry: Oxford
- Deanery: Oxford

Clergy
- Vicar: Daniel Walters

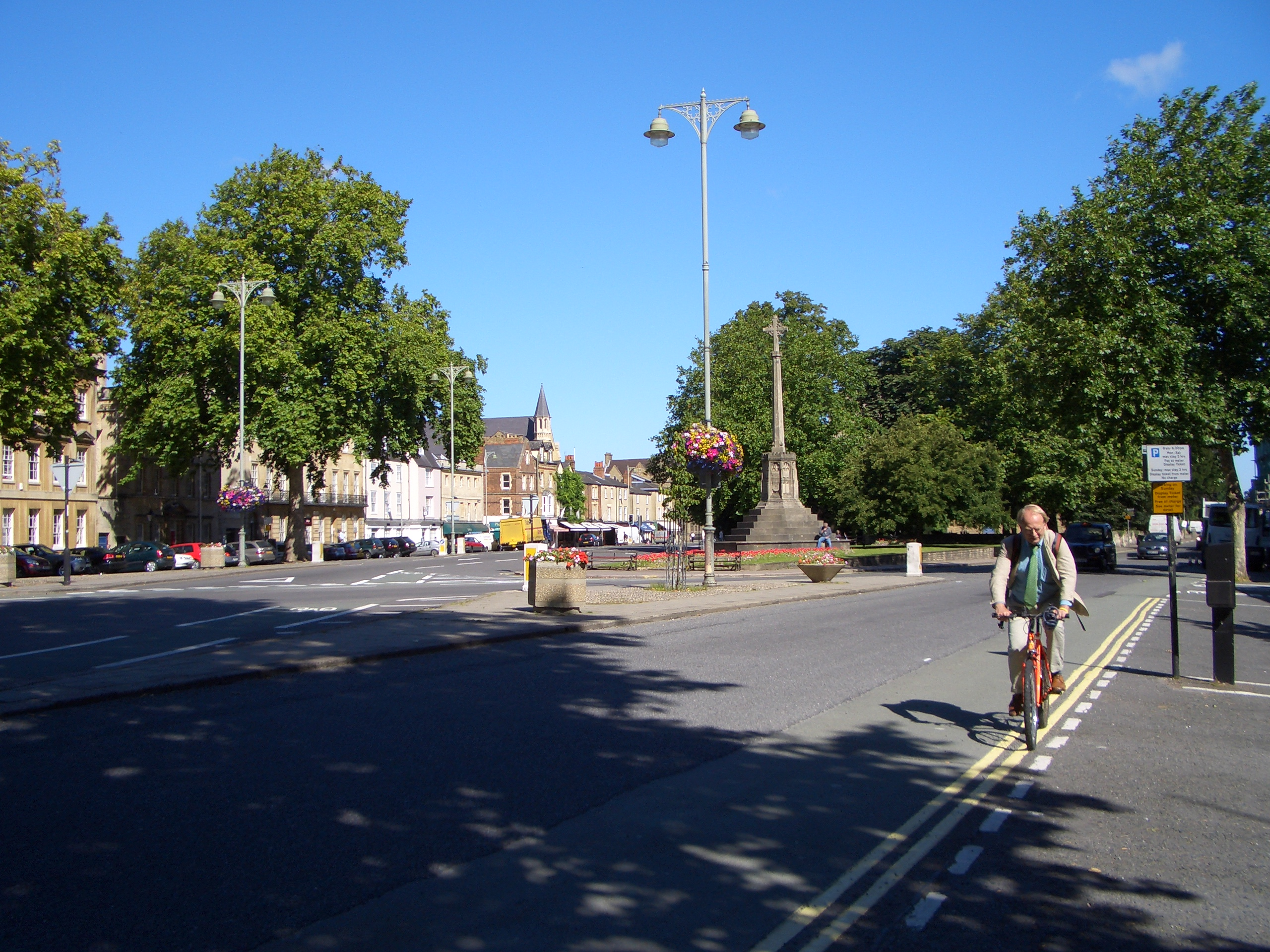
Oxford War Memorial just south of the church at the northern end of St Giles', where it divides into Woodstock Road (left) and Banbury Road (right)

St Giles' Church is a church in North Oxford, England. It is at the northern end of the wide thoroughfare of St Giles', at the point where it meets Woodstock Road and Banbury Road. It stands between where Little Clarendon Street joins Woodstock Road and Keble Road joins Banbury Road.

The church was built in the 12th and 13th centuries.

Oxford War Memorial adjoins the southern end of St Giles' churchyard.

== Foundation, dedication and building ==
The church was first mentioned in the Domesday Book of 1086, where it was recorded that the owner of the land north of the city intended to build a Norman church there. The church was built for one Edwin, son of Godegose and finished in 1120. In 1139, Edwin granted the church and all its property to the then newly created Benedictine Godstow Abbey, 2 miles (3.2 km) to the northwest.

St Giles' Church is 550 yards (500 m) north of the old Oxford city wall, and when built it stood in open fields. There were no other buildings between it and the city wall, where the St Michael at the North Gate church stands. About a thousand people lived within the walls of Oxford at this time.

The church was not actually consecrated until 1200, by Saint Hugh, Bishop of Lincoln. There is a 13th- or 14th-century consecration cross consisting of interlaced circles cut into the western column of the bell tower that is believed to commemorate this. Also in commemoration of the consecration, St Giles' Fair was established. The fair continues to this day, held on the Monday and Tuesday after the Sunday following 1 September, which is St Giles' Day. St Hugh also expanded the St Mary Magdalen's Church to the south in 1194.

Surviving 12th-century features of the church include two windows in the north side of the clerestory of the nave and the lower parts of the bell tower. The tower was finished early in the 13th century, which is the date of the aisle arcades and Early English Gothic lancet windows as well. The Decorated Gothic chancel was built late in the 13th century.

The tower space, occupied by an organ since 1953 but removed in 2025 pending replacement in 2028, features thick supporting columns crowned by 12C (c.1170) Waterleaf capitals of simple flowing design. These were obscured until the removal of the organ. The capitals and surrounding sculptures and layout of the church including windows, are illustrated in detail by drawings in the book "Views and details of Saint Giles' Church, Oxford 1842 - Oxford : John Henry Parker for the Architectural Society" .

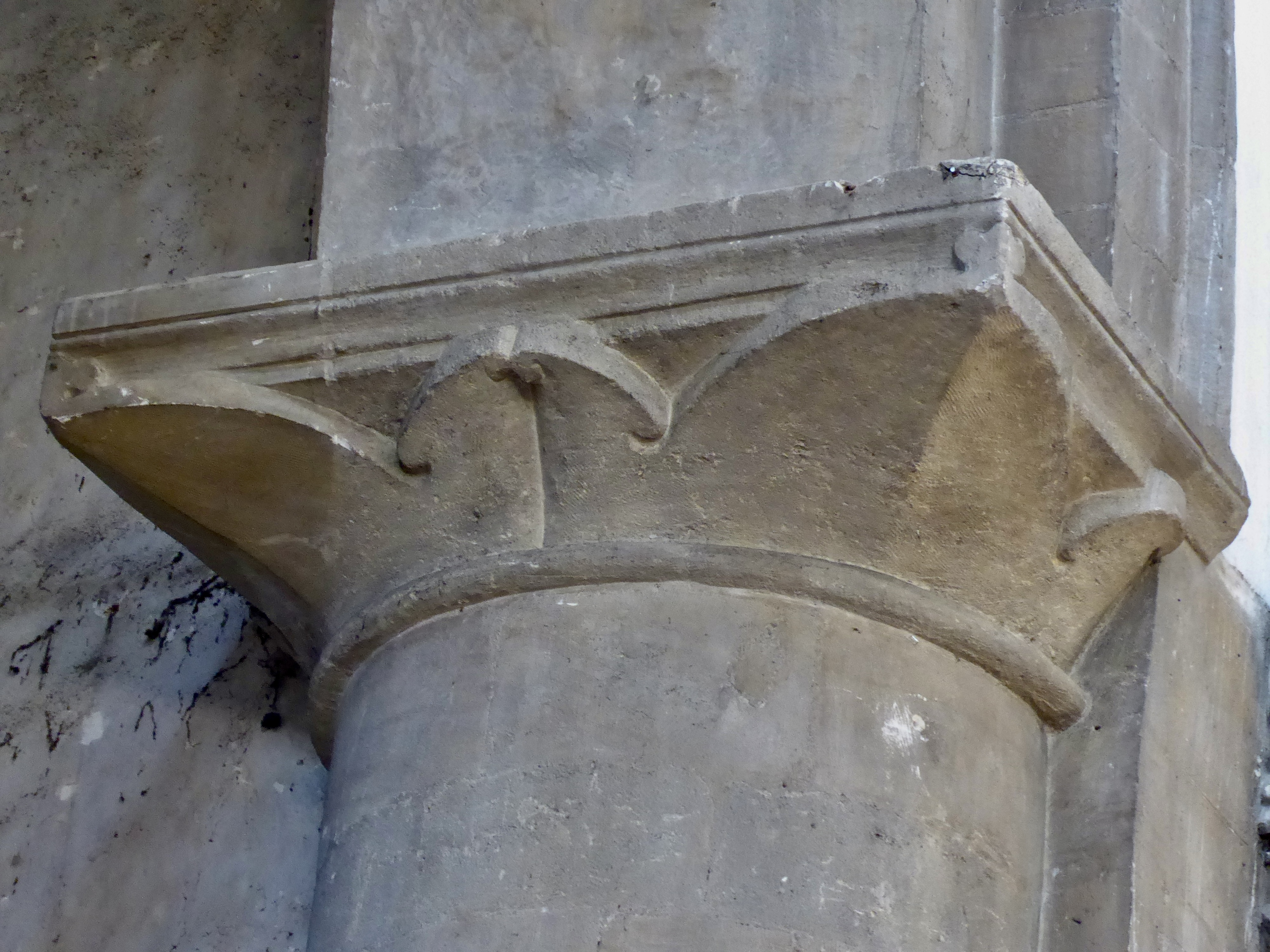
Waterleaf capital c. 1170

== During and after the Reformation ==
Godstow Abbey surrendered St Giles' church and all its lands to the Crown in 1539 during the dissolution of the monasteries. In 1542 the Crown granted St Giles' to Dr George Owen of Godstow, a physician of King Henry VIII. In 1573 his son Richard Owen sold St Giles to Sir Thomas White, Lord Mayor of London, who in 1555 had refounded the Cistercian house of St Bernard on the east side of St Giles' Street as St John's College. Sir Thomas granted St Giles' to St John's, which since then has held the advowson of the parish. Incumbents of St Giles' have included two notable Laudians: William Juxon from 1610 to 1615 and Thomas Turner from 1624 to 1629.

Monuments in St Giles' church include figurines of Henry Bosworth (died 1634), his wife Alice and their three children. They seem to have been made for a tomb that has not survived. St Giles' church was damaged during the English Civil War, in which the Parliamentarian army besieged the Royalist force defending Charles I in Oxford. John Goad, vicar from 1644 until 1646, is said to have led services in St Giles during Parliamentary artillery bombardments of Oxford in 1645. The Civil War may have been when the Bosworth tomb was destroyed.

St Giles' church building received only minor repairs during the 17th and 18th centuries. At different times in the 19th century parts of the building were repaired and the chapel on the south side of the chancel was partly rebuilt.

South Waterleaf Capital c. 1170

== The benefice since the 19th century ==
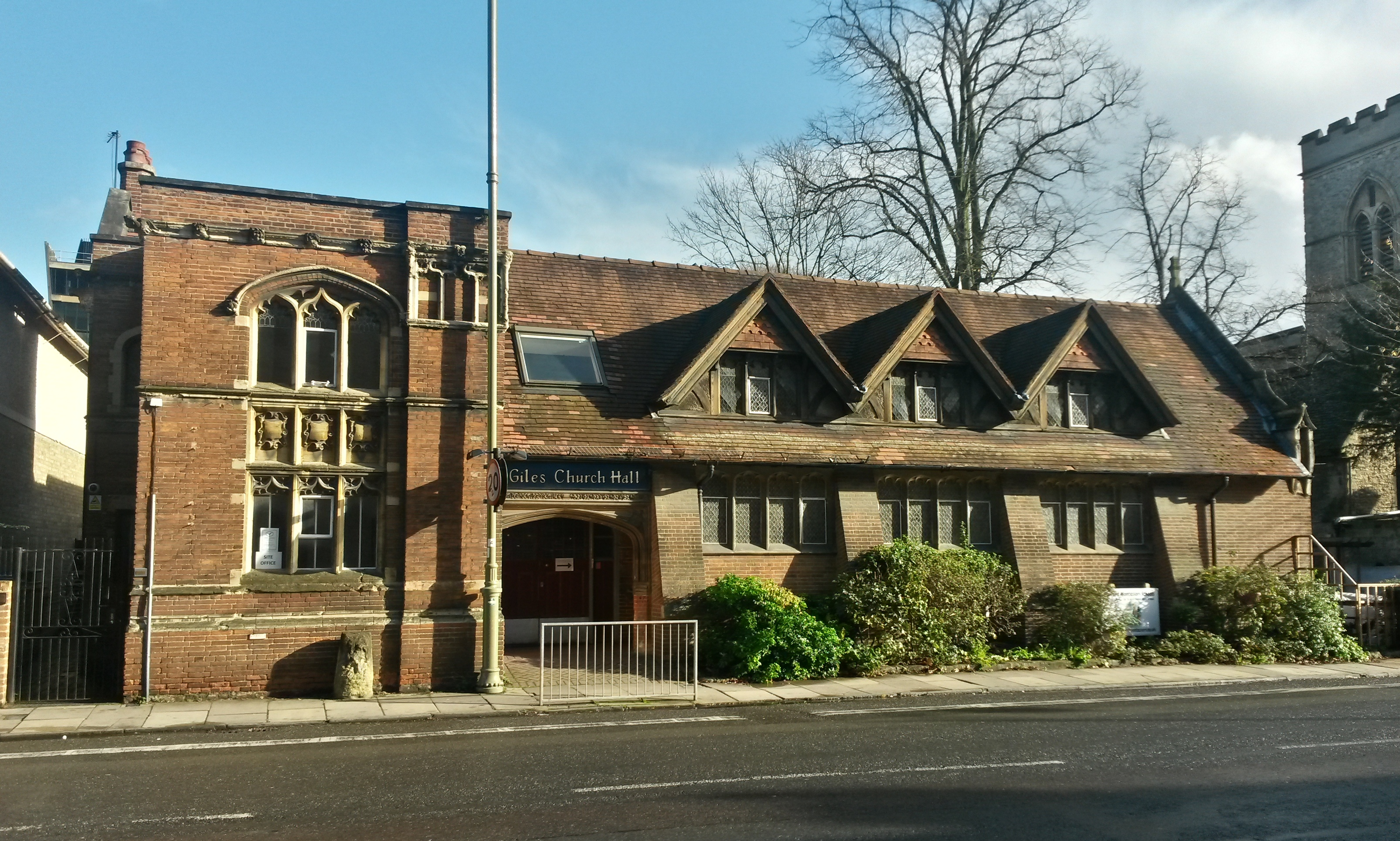
The church hall, located on Woodstock Road.

Oxford has expanded over time, so St Giles' church is now relatively central within the city. As north Oxford was built up and its population grew, new parishes were created out of parts of St Giles'. They included St Philip and St James', consecrated in 1862 and St Margaret's, consecrated as a daughter church of SS. Philip and James in 1883. St Giles remains a separate ecclesiastical parish but is now reunited with the parish of St Philip and St James with St Margaret in a united benefice.

== Bells ==
The bell tower has a ring of eight bells. The oldest bell is the tenor, cast by Ellis Knight I of Reading, Berkshire in 1632. Five more were cast by William Taylor, presumably at the Taylor family's then Oxford bell-foundry, in 1850: the same year as the rebuilding of St Giles' south chapel was begun. St Giles' youngest bells are the treble and second, cast in 1927 by Mears and Stainbank at the Whitechapel Bell Foundry in the East End of London.

The 8 bells of St Giles Oxford were removed in August 2011 for repair and tuning. After the tuning was completed at the Whitechapel Bell Foundry, the bells returned to St Giles Church Oxford on 7 November 2011 for re-hanging by Whites of Appleton.

== See also ==
- St Giles' Fair, held each September on St Giles' south of the church
- St Mary Magdalen's Church, to the south
- St Michael at the Northgate, also to the south, Oxford's oldest building
- Edward Drax Free, vicar

== Sources ==
British History

- Crossley, Alan; Elrington, C. R.; Chance, Eleanor; Colvin, Christina; Cooper, Janet; Day, C.J.; Hassall, T.G.; Selwyn, Nesta (1979). A History of the County of Oxford. Victoria County History. Vol. 4. pp. 369–412.
- Sherwood, Jennifer; Pevsner, Nikolaus (1974). Oxfordshire. The Buildings of England. Harmondsworth: Penguin Books. pp. 292–293. ISBN 0-14-071045-0.
