= John O'Gaunt Golf Club =

Golf club in Bedfordshire, England

- Location within Bedfordshire
- 52°7′2″N 0°13′8″W

Club information
- Location: Sutton, Bedfordshire, England
- Established: 1948
- Total holes: 36

John O'Gaunt Golf Club is a golf club, located two-and-a-half miles to the north-east of Biggleswade, Bedfordshire, England, just north of the village of Sutton. It was established in 1948. The Club has two 18-hole courses; the original John O'Gaunt and the Carthagena which opened in 1980. The Club hosted the English Golf Union Seniors Championship in 1988 and 2003 and was used as the venue for Final Qualifying for the Women's British Open in 2016.
