= Potton Brook =

River in Cambridgeshire and Bedfordshire, England

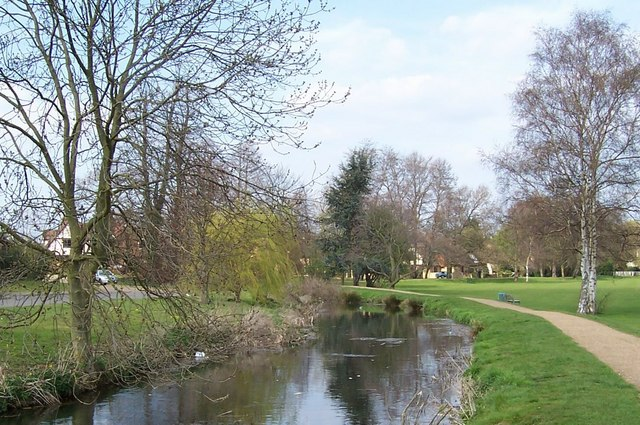
- Horse Brook tributary to Potton Brook on west side of Henry Smith Playfields, Potton

Location
- Country: England
- Counties: Bedfordshire, Cambridgeshire
- Unitary Authority: Central Bedfordshire

Physical characteristics
- Source
  - location: east of Gamlingay, Cambridgeshire, England
  - coordinates: 52°9′5.13″N 0°9′39.54″W
- Mouth
  - location: Bedfordshire, England
  - coordinates: 52°6′48″N 0°16′37″W
  - elevation: 25 m (82 ft)
- Length: 15.656 km (9.728 mi)
- Discharge
  - location: Sandy

Potton Brook is a watercourse in Bedfordshire, England. It is a continuation of Millbridge Brook; the two having a combined length of 15.656 km (9.7 miles). Potton Brook joins the River Ivel northeast of Lower Caldecote.

== Course ==
Potton Brook is a continuation of Millbridge Brook, whose source is found east of Gamlingay and north of East Hatley in Cambridgeshire. Millbridge Brook passes through the Millbridge Brook Meadows community recreation area in Gamlingay, where there is a 'dipping' beach and platform, and where a set of stepping stones cross the brook. Millbridge Brook then passes beneath Station Road and the B1040 road, and becomes Potton Brook. The actual point of the change in name is unclear; maps show it could be shortly before the stream crosses from Cambridgeshire into Central Bedfordshire, or right on the border.

Potton Brook flows along the eastern boundary of the Henry Smith Playing Fields in Potton, while on the west side of the playing fields is the Horse Brook.

== Hydrology ==
Potton Brook and Millbridge Brook combine to form a single water body that has a total length of 15.656 km (9.728 mi). When measured in 2022, the water body had a moderate ecological status. Its hydromorphological designation is 'heavily modified', meaning it fails to achieve good ecological status owing to significant man-made alterations to its natural physical character. Environment Agency data gives the Millbridge and Potton Brooks Water Body a catchment area of 65.419 km^{2} (25.258 sq mi). It is one of twenty water bodies of the Ivel Operational Catchment.

== History ==
Sutton Packhorse Bridge, a Grade-II* listed building in the village of Sutton, has a length of 40 m (130 ft) and was built in the late 13th century. The bridge was first mentioned in historical records in 1504. The bridge was used as a trade route for wool between the towns of Bedford and Dunstable, and is a general legacy of the "packhorse bridges" of the Medieval period.

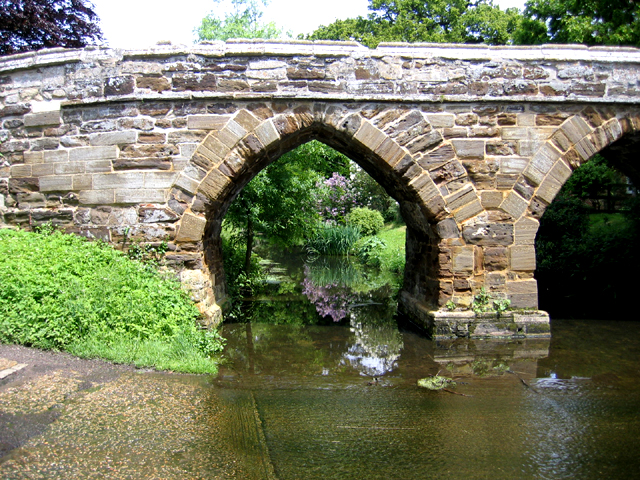
Sutton Packhorse Bridge, a Medieval packhorse bridge.

== See also ==
- River Ivel
