= Old Rectory, Epworth =

Queen Anne-style building in Lincolnshire, now a museum

Coordinates: 53°31′23″N 0°49′02″W

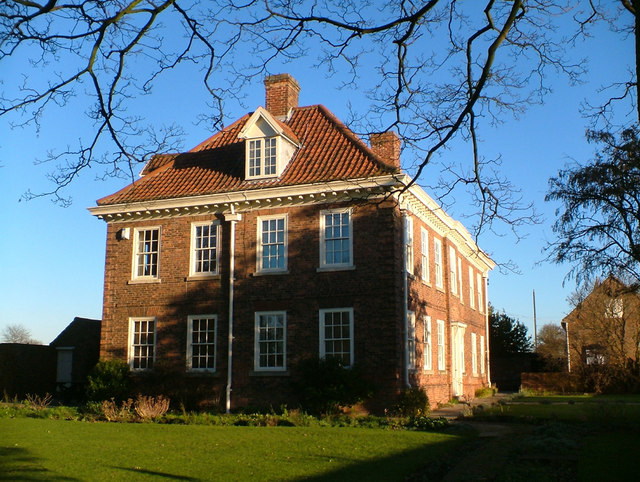
The Old Rectory, Epworth

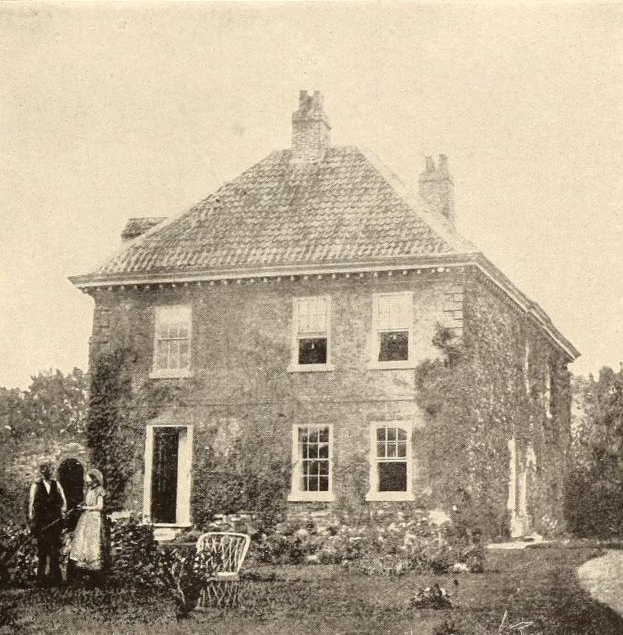
Epworth Rectory in c. 1890

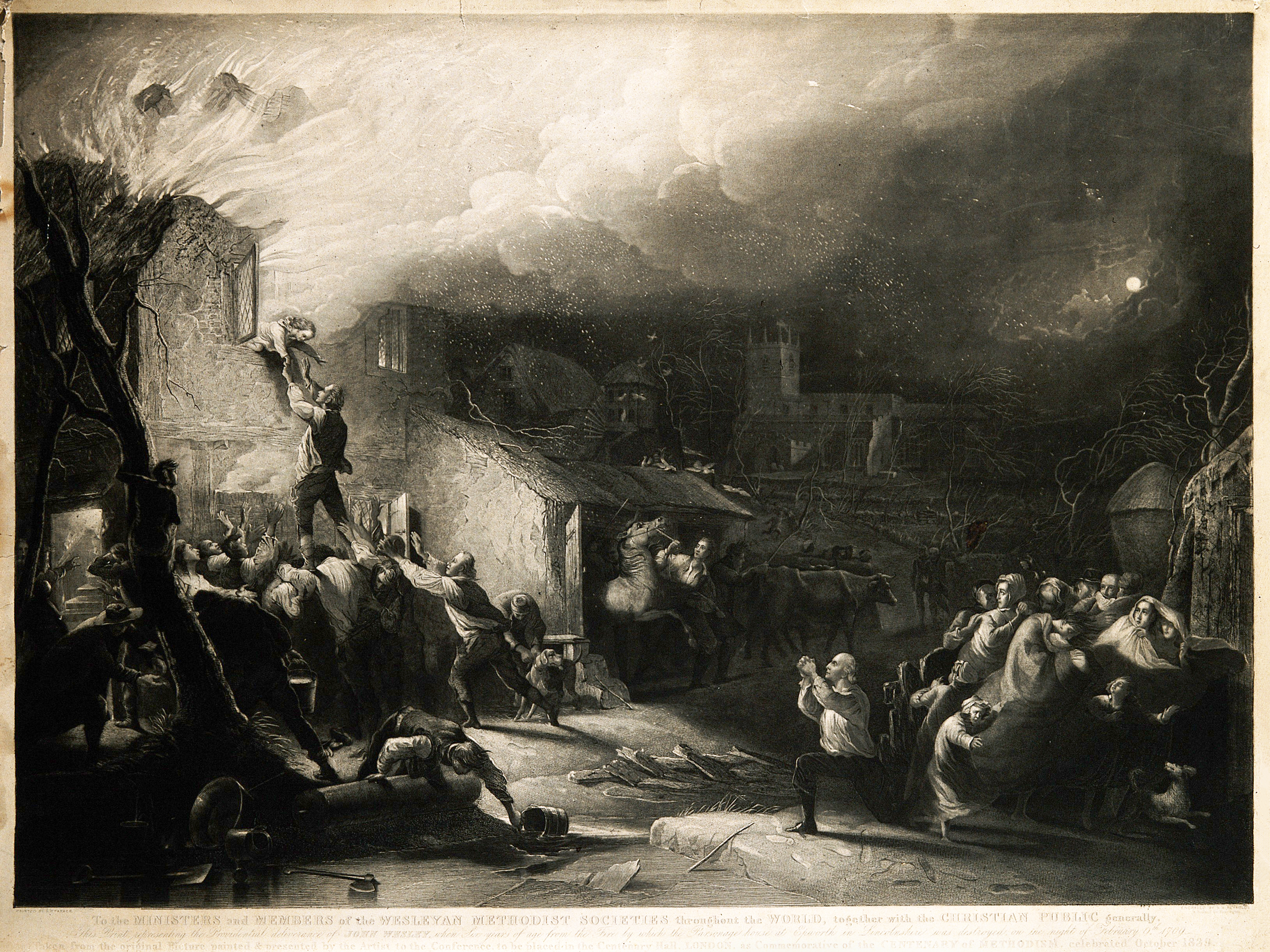
"The rescue of the young John Wesley from the burning parsonage at Epworth, Lincolnshire"; mezzotint by S. W. Reynolds after Henry Perlee Parker

The Old Rectory in Epworth, Lincolnshire is a Queen Anne-style building, rebuilt in 1709, which has been restored and is now the property of the Methodist Church of Great Britain, who maintain it as a museum. The rectory was home to the rector of Epworth from 1697 to 1735, the Reverend Samuel Wesley, his wife Susanna and their 19 children, one of whom, John Wesley, grew up to become a founder of Methodism. On 9 February 1709, while the Wesleys were resident, a fire burnt down the wooden rectory and it was rebuilt in brick. The Old Rectory is a Grade I listed building.

In 1954 the Church of England sold the rectory to the British Methodist Church, who purchased it with financial support from the World Methodist Council. The building was restored by Thomas Rayson and some of the external features were returned to how the Wesleys would have known the house. The Old Rectory is managed by a board of trustees appointed by the British Methodist Conference and the World Methodist Council. The chair of trustees (2015) is the Rev. Graham Carter, a past president of the Methodist Conference.

It is the site of supposed paranormal events that occurred in 1716, while the Wesley family was living in the house.

== Epworth Rectory haunting ==
The Epworth Rectory haunting, also known as the "Wesley poltergeist", is one of the best-known English poltergeist claims. From December 1716 until January 1717, it is said to have been plagued by a series of regularly occurring loud noises and knockings, claimed to be caused by a ghost. Wesley's fourth eldest daughter Hetty nicknamed the spirit "Old Jeffrey", who is said to have made his presence known to all on Christmas Day 1716. In Mrs Wesley's words, "there was such a noise in the room over our heads, as if several people were walking, then running up and down stairs that we thought the children would be frightened". According to the tale, as she and her husband searched the house in vain for the culprit, "Old Jeffrey" continued "rattling and thundering in every room, and even blowing an invisible horn at deafening decibels". "Old Jeffrey" supposedly disappeared in January 1717 just as suddenly as he had appeared.

Addington Bruce (1908) noted that the earliest records that document the haunting have large discrepancies from later reports. According to Bruce, the original records from the 18th century reduce the "haunting" to nothing more than some alleged creaking noises, knocks, footsteps or groaning sounds. Bruce commented that "we are, therefore, justified in believing that in this case, like so many others of its kind, the fallibility of human memory has played an overwhelming part in exaggerating the experiences actually undergone." He suggested that Hetty had produced the phenomena fraudulently.

Trevor H. Hall in his book New Light on Old Ghosts (1965) also provided natural explanations for the phenomena at the Rectory.
