= Montagu Burgoyne =

British politician and writer

- Born: 19 July 1750
- Died: 6 March 1836 (aged 85)
- Education: Trinity Hall, Cambridge M.A.
- Occupations: politician and writer
- Spouse: Elizabeth nee Harvey (m. 1780)
- Children: 2 sons, 2 daughters
- Father: Sir Roger Burgoyne, 6th Baronet

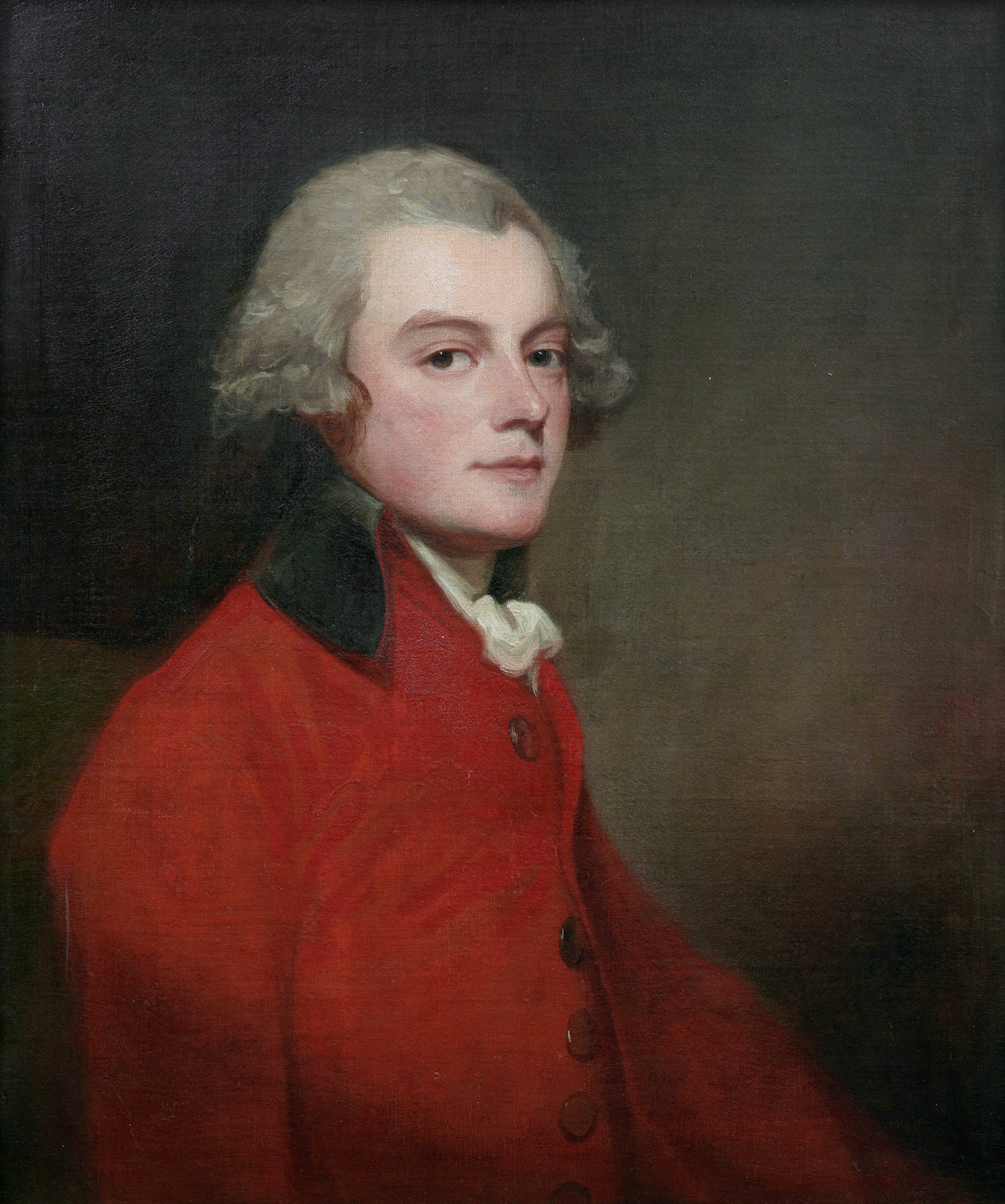
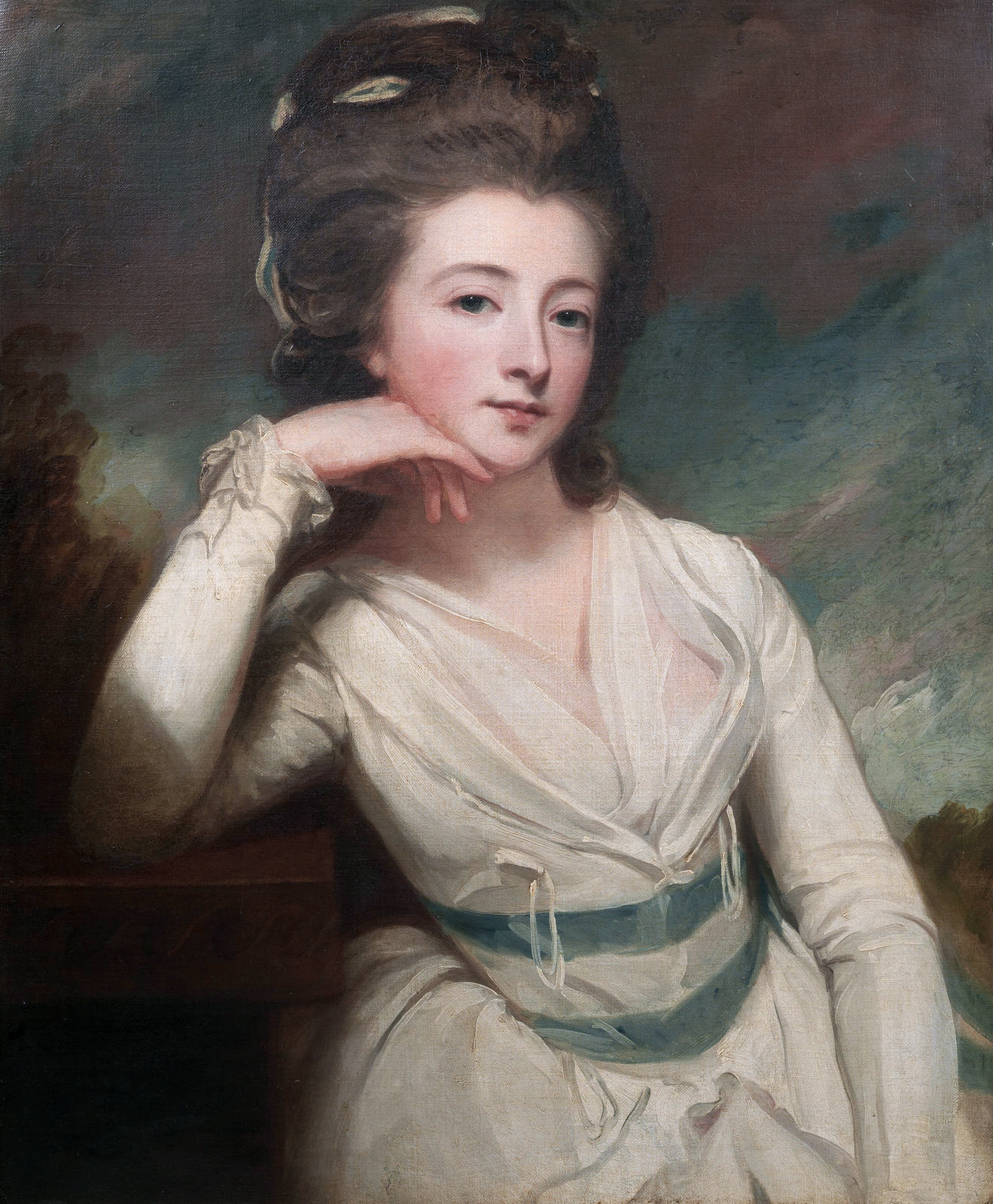
Montagu and Elizabeth Burgoyne (George Romney)

Montagu Burgoyne (19 July 1750 – 6 March 1836) was a British politician and writer.

== Life ==
Burgoyne was a younger son of Sir Roger Burgoyne, 6th Baronet (1710–1780) of Burgoyne of Sutton, Bedfordshire. He was a member of Trinity Hall, Cambridge where he gained his M.A. in 1774.

Lord North gave him the sinecure office of Chamberlain of the Till office in the Exchequer, worth 1,600l. per annum and was for many years Verderer of Epping Forest. He stood as candidate for Essex in 1810, but was defeated by John Archer-Houblon. Burgoyne was an advocate of the land allotment system.

On 30 October 1780, he married Elizabeth (1761–abt 1842), daughter and heiress of Eliab Harvey (1716–1769) (uncle of Eliab Harvey) and Mary Benyon (d. 1765). They had two sons, who died in infancy, and two daughters. They resided at Mark Hall, Harlow. It is said that Mr and Mrs Burgoyne were entitled to receive, if they did not actually receive, the flitch of bacon at Dunmow Priory.

He was author of several letters and booklets:

- A letter from Montagu Burgoyne, Esquire, of Mark Hall, [to the freeholders of the county of Essex] on the present state of public affairs, and the representation of the county of Essex (London: Printed for Messrs. Meggy and Chalk, 1808; London: R. Taylor)
- A letter from Montagu Burgoyne, Esq. of Mark Hall, to the freeholders and inhabitants of the County of Essex: on the present state of public affairs, and the pressing necessity of a reform in the Commons House of Parliament (London: Sold by Messrs. Meggy, and Chalk, 1809; London: R. Taylor)
- A letter from Montagu Burgoyne, Esq. of Mark Hall, to the freeholders and inhabitants of the County of Essex: on the present awful crisis of public affairs, the pressing necessity of a reform in Parliament, and a more complete organisation of our resources for the internal defence of the Empire (London: Printed by Richard Taylor and Co., 1810)
- An account of the proceedings in the late election in Essex: with the speeches of the candidates and their friends, &c. and a preface (London: [s.n.], 1810; London: Printed by W. Pople)
- A letter from Montagu Burgoyne, Esq. of Mark Hall, to the freeholders of Essex: on the subject of the county meeting, holden at Chelmsford, on 27 February, for the purpose of petitioning Parliament against the property tax, whatever modifications might be introduced into it [S.l.: s.n.], London: Printed by C. H. Reynell, 1816)
- A statistical account of the hundreds of Harlow, Ongar, and the half hundred of Waltham: with the particulars of the expenditure of the poor's rates in 42 parishes of these divisions / by a magistrate of the county of Essex (London: Sold by Hatchard, 1817; London: Philanthropic Society)
- A letter to the Right Hon. Sturges Bourne, M.P. from Montagu Burgoyne, Esq. on the subject of the removal of the Irish: by the 59th Geo. III. Cap. XII. Sec. 33 (London: Printed by J. Shaw, 1820)
- An address to the governors and directors of the public charity schools pointing out some defects and suggesting remedies (London: Rivington, 1829; Brighton: W. Fleet)
- A letter from Montagu Burgoyne, Esq. churchwarden of Sutton, to his brother churchwardens in the diocese of Lincoln : giving a summary account, of the prosecution, conviction, and deprivation of the Rev. Dr. Edward Drax Free, rector of Sutton (London: Rivington and Hatchard, 1830)
- The Reverend Edward Drax Free, doctor in divinity, against Montagu Burgoyne, Esquire, promoter of the office of the judge (London: Rivingtons, 1830)
- A letter to the Right Honorable the Lord Duncannon: and the Lords Commissioners of His Majesty's woods and forests, shewing the necessity of the removal of the deer from the forests of Waltham and Hainault, and also of an enclosure of parts of these forests, in order to protect His Majesty's rights, preserve the timber belonging to the crown, and the crops of the farmers, to find employment and provision for the labouring poor, and above all to suppress the vice and immorality which are encouraged and sheltered by the present state of these forests (London: Printed by Shaw and Sons for Rivingtons, 1831)
- An address to the governors and directors of the public charity schools: pointing out some defects and suggesting remedies (London: Printed by Shaw and sons for Rivingtons, 1831)
- A letter from a friend of enclosures and allotments of land, provided for the labouring poor in preference to emigration, addressed to the secretary of the Labourers' Friend Society (England?: s.n., 1831?)
- An answer to Juvenis, or, A recommendation of the allotment system: in providing a small portion of land to every poor labourer to be cultivated by him for his own benefit (London: Printed by Shaw for Rivingtons, 1834)

== See also ==
- Burgoyne baronets
