= Chester War Memorial =

Memorial in Chester, Cheshire, England

Coordinates: 53.19159°N 2.89085°W

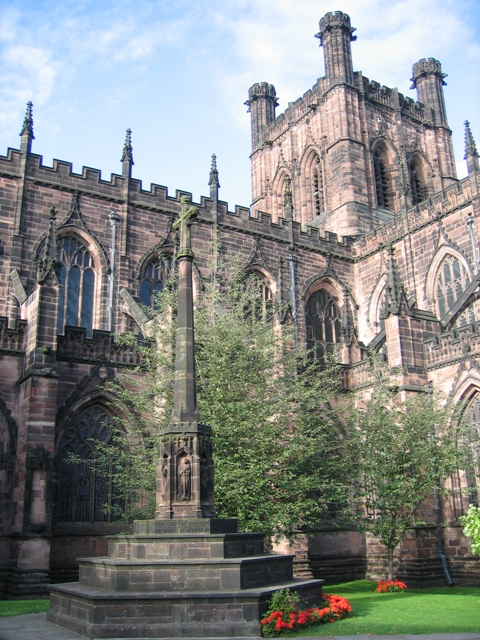
Chester War Memorial in the grounds of Chester Cathedral

Chester War Memorial stands in the grounds of Chester Cathedral in Chester, Cheshire, England. It was designed by Frederick Crossley and Thomas Rayson, and commemorates those who were lost in the two World Wars. The memorial is recorded in the National Heritage List for England as a designated Grade II listed building.

== History ==
In 1919 Chester City Council formed the Chester War Memorial Committee to make recommendations for a memorial to those lost in the First World War. Some schemes for public and social improvement were suggested, but these were considered to be too expensive. William Beswick, the son of the county architect, was asked to prepare two designs, without a fee: one to stand outside the Town Hall, the other outside the King's School. Both were accepted by the committee. Another idea was to reconstruct the medieval Chester Cross. The King's School rejected the plan for the memorial on their site, and the other two plans were rejected by the City Council.

Following a public meeting it was agreed that the monument should include a prominent cross, and that it should be sited in the centre of the city. Giles Gilbert Scott was asked to design a monument to stand in the grounds of the cathedral. His design included the figure of Saint Michael under a cross, all under a canopy, to stand in the cathedral grounds. This had an estimated cost of £4,000. It was approved by the committee, but as it was to stand on cathedral land, the cathedral had the last word, and the design was vetoed by the dean, possibly because of its height of nearly 12 metres (39 ft). The committee then asked Scott for a simpler design, based on the "cross on steps" model familiar in many English market crosses. This was produced, and would have cost £2,500, but it was rejected by the committee.

The committee then decided to hold a competition to design a memorial cross to stand in the cathedral enclosure, and to cost less than £2,000. In 1921, out of 23 entries, the design of Frederick Crossley and Thomas Rayson was chosen, with that of William Beswick coming second. The total cost of the monument came to £1,540 (equivalent to £86,000 in 2023). The figures on the monument were sculpted by Alec Miller of Chipping Camden, and the contractors were W. Haswell and Sons of Chester. The monument was unveiled on 24 May 1922 by two mothers who had lost sons in the war and was dedicated by the Bishop of Chester. Following the Second World War, a further inscription was added.

== Description ==
The monument is constructed in red sandstone from a quarry in Delamere, matching the exterior stone of the cathedral. It stands about 9.75 metres (32 ft) high. It has a hexagonal base of four steps from which rises a plinth that supports a cross. Around the plinth are niches in the Gothic style containing the figures of six saints who are identified as follows: Werburgh, the patron saint of Chester; George, the patron saint of England; Maurice, a warrior saint who represents the infantry; Alban, a soldier and the first British martyr; David, the patron saint of Wales (many of Chester's inhabitants are from Wales) and Michael, the Biblical archangel who overthrew Satan. On the fourth step of the base is the following inscription:

ERECTED BY A GRATEFUL CITY
IN HONOUR OF HER SONS
WHO GAVE THEIR LIVES FOR
THEIR COUNTRY IN THE
GREAT WAR 1914–1918
THEIR NAMES ARE ENGRAVED
ON TABLETS OF BRONZE IN
THE TOWN HALL AND THEIR
IMPERISHABLE MEMORY
IN THE HEARTS OF THEIR
FELLOW CITIZENS.

The west side of the third step is inscribed with the dates 1939–1945.

The monument was designated as a Grade II listed building on 6 August 1998. Grade II is the lowest of the three grades of listing and is applied to "buildings of national importance and special interest". As of 2012 its condition is described as being "generally good but with minor damage to the figures".

== See also ==
- Grade II listed buildings in Chester (central)
