= Edward Bowles (minister) =

English minister

Edward Bowles (1613-1662) was an English Presbyterian minister.

== Life ==
Bowles was born in February 1613 at Sutton, Bedfordshire. His father was Oliver Bowles, B.D., minister of Sutton, and one of the oldest members of the Westminster Assembly, also author of 'Zeale for God's House quickned: a Fast Sermon before the Assembly of the Lords, Commons, and Divines,' 1643, and 'De Pastore Evangelico,' 1649; 1655 and 1659, (published by his son, and dedicated to the Earl of Manchester).

Bowles was educated at Catherine Hall, Cambridge, under Richard Sibbes and Ralph Brownrigge. He was chaplain to the Earl of Manchester, and after the surrender of York, 15 July 1644, was appointed one of the four parliamentary ministers in that city, officiating alternately at the Minster and All Saints, Pavement. On 10 June 1645 the House of Commons voted him £100 as one of the ministers in the army. His preaching was popular, even with hearers not of his own views. Among the Presbyterians of the city and district he was a recognised leader. On 29 December 1657 he wrote to Secretary John Thurloe, urging the suppression of preachers who advocated the observance of Christmas Day.

In 1660 he was active in the restoration of the monarchy, accompanying Fairfax to Breda. A Presbyterian excluded from York Minster, he continued to preach at Allhallows, and subsequently at St. Martin's, besides conducting a Thursday lecture at St. Peter's. The parishioners of Leeds petitioned the king in April 1661 for his appointment to that vicarage, but it was given to John Lake. Efforts were made (Calamy says by John Tillotson and Edward Stillingfleet) to induce him to conform; but when asked in his last illness what he disliked in conformity, he replied 'The whole.' He died just before the Uniformity Act 1662 came into force, and was buried on 23 August 1662. His wife, who predeceased him, was a granddaughter of Matthew Hutton, and widow of John Robynson of Deighton.

== Works ==
He published:

- The Mystery of Iniquity yet working, &c., 1643 (against popery).
- Manifest Truth, 1646 (a narrative of the proceedings of the Scottish army, and vindication of the parliament, in reply to a tract called Truths Manifest).
- Good Counsell for Evil Times, 1648, (sermon [Eph. v. 15, 16] at St. Paul's, before the Lord Mayor of London).
- The Dutie and Danger of Swearing, 1655 (sermon at York).
- A Plain and Short Catechism (anon), 8th edit. 1676, (reprinted in Edmund Calamy's Continuation and in Thomas Smith James's History of the Litigation and Legislation respecting Presbyterian chapels, 1867).

The will, dated 9 July 1707, codicil 21 August 1710, of Sarah Hewley, widow of Sir John Hewley, left a large estate and founded several trusts for almshouses; a condition of admission to the almshouses was the repeating of Bowles's catechism. In the lawsuit begun on 18 June 1830, over the Lady Hewley Trust, use was made on both sides of the doctrinal statements and omissions in the catechism.

His sermons are held at the British Library.
