= Thomas Rayson =

English architect (born 1888)

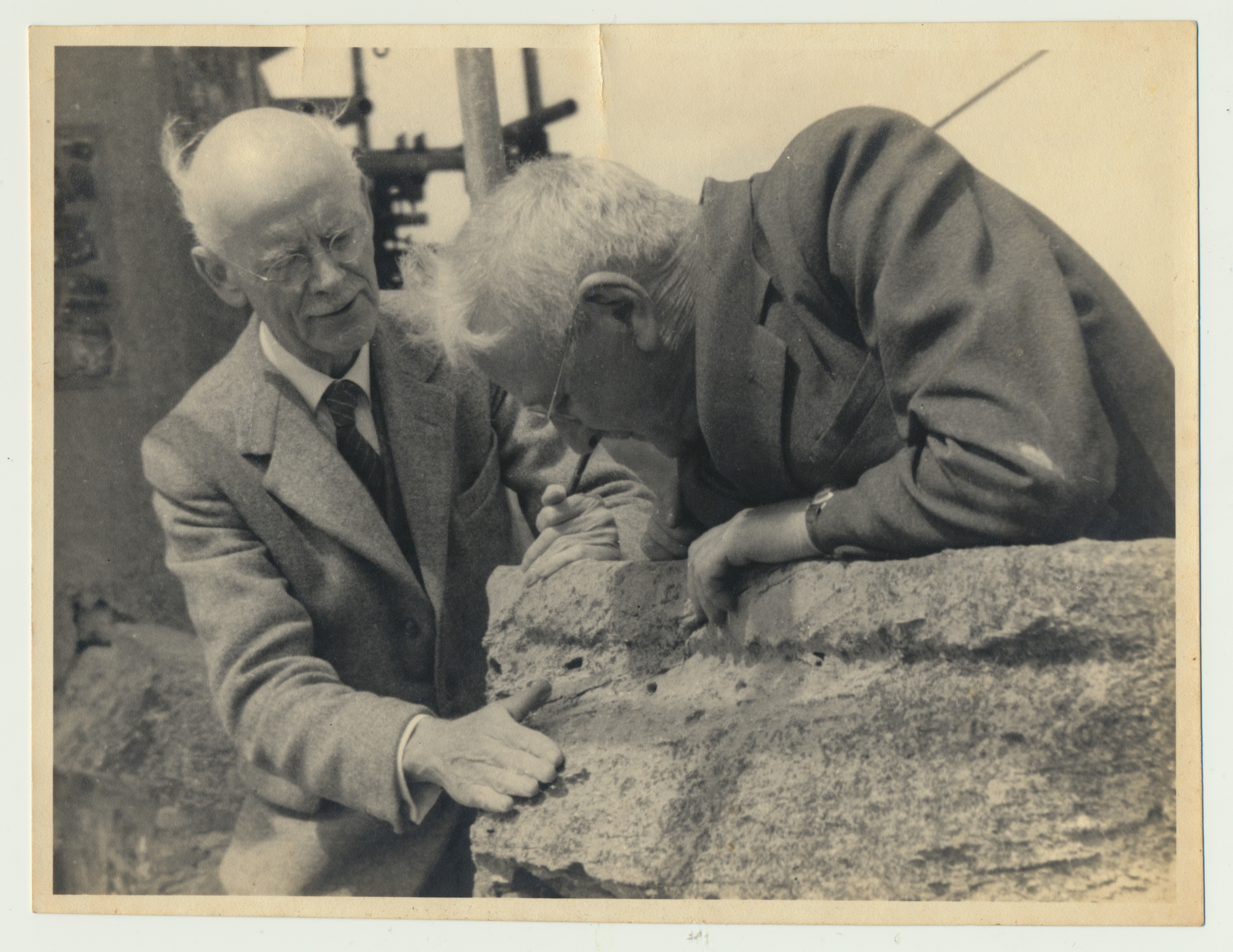
Thomas Rayson (left) and Canon Crosse (right) on top of the tower of St Mary's Church, Henley, Oxfordshire in December 1955

Thomas Rayson (5 December 1888 – 28 January 1976) was an English architect who practised in Oxford, and also a watercolourist.

== Family ==
Rayson was born in Madras, India, on 5 December 1888, the second son of William John Rayson, who was then a railway engineer with the Locomotion Fabrication Plant for Indian Railways, and his wife Elizabeth A. English. The family returned to England in 1890 and initially stayed at 8 Chandos Road, West Ham, with the family of Thomas's maternal grandfather James English, who was a foreman boiler maker. Thomas's father then took over the Union Flag pub at 178 Lambeth Road, London.

Thomas Rayson married Helen Hilton in 1933, and they had two children: Christopher (1934) and Julia (1937).

He died at the Churchill Hospital, Oxford, on 28 January 1976.

== Education ==
Rayson served articles with Robert Curwen of Bishopsgate Street in London, and then studied under Professor Arthur Beresford Pite and James Black Fulton at the Brixton School of Building. He was admitted as an Associate of the Royal Institute of British Architects in 1918 and as a Fellow in 1927.

== Career ==
Rayson first came to Oxford in 1910 as an assistant to the architect Nathaniel William Harrison, and in 1911 he was an architectural draughtsman of 22 boarding with his employer’s brother Hude Harrison and his family at 28 Warwick Street in east Oxford.

He was unable to undertake active service in the First World War as he had a collapsed lung. After spending time in Cambridge working on hospitals from 1916, in 1918 he was employed at the Ministry of Works, and was the site engineer of Witney Aerodrome in Oxfordshire.

He started his practice in Oxford in an office in Turl Street, but had moved his office to 15 Broad Street by 1922 and to 47 Broad Street by 1930. By 1926 he was Housing Architect to the Municipal Authorities at Witney and Tottenham, London, where he designed housing schemes.

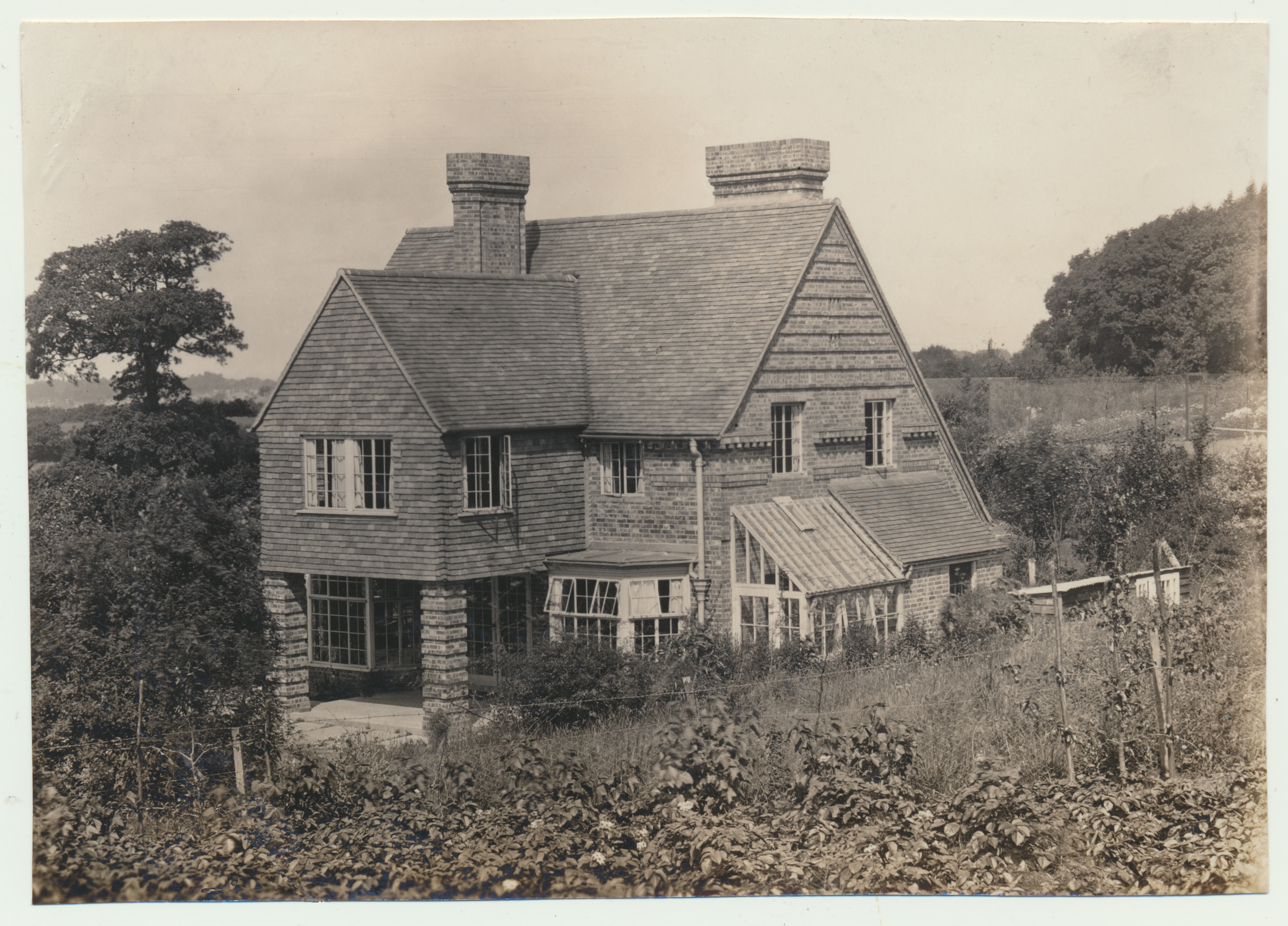
Roundabouts, the house designed in c.1930 by Thomas Rayson for his family

In about 1930 he designed his own house called Roundabouts in The Ridings at the foot of Shotover.

In 1936 Rayson's office at 47 Broad Street was one of the buildings demolished to make way for the New Bodleian Library (now the Weston Library), and he moved his office to 35 Beaumont Street. In the late 1940s he moved his office again, this time to 29 Beaumont Street.

Rayson, who is described by Geoffrey Tyack as "the last of Oxford's Arts and Crafts-inspired architects", disliked most modern architecture in Oxford, saying: "St. Catherine's is in brick. It shouldn't be. St. Anne's, Somerville, and St. Hugh's – I should have liked them all to be in harmony with the Oxford tradition. The Law Library? Frankly I don't understand it: why that great monolithic block with columns underneath. Two words describe a lot of modern building like a lot of modern painting and music: barren and empty. One longs for something to hang on to and enjoy."

He enjoyed drawing and painting, and served as Chairman of the Oxford Art Society. He was also musical and ran a quartet with friends and played with the Oxford Orchestral Society.

In 1966 he handed over his office at 29 Beaumont Street to his son Christopher Rayson, who was also an architect, and continued to work with him as a consultant until ill health caused him to retire in 1973/4.

== Works ==
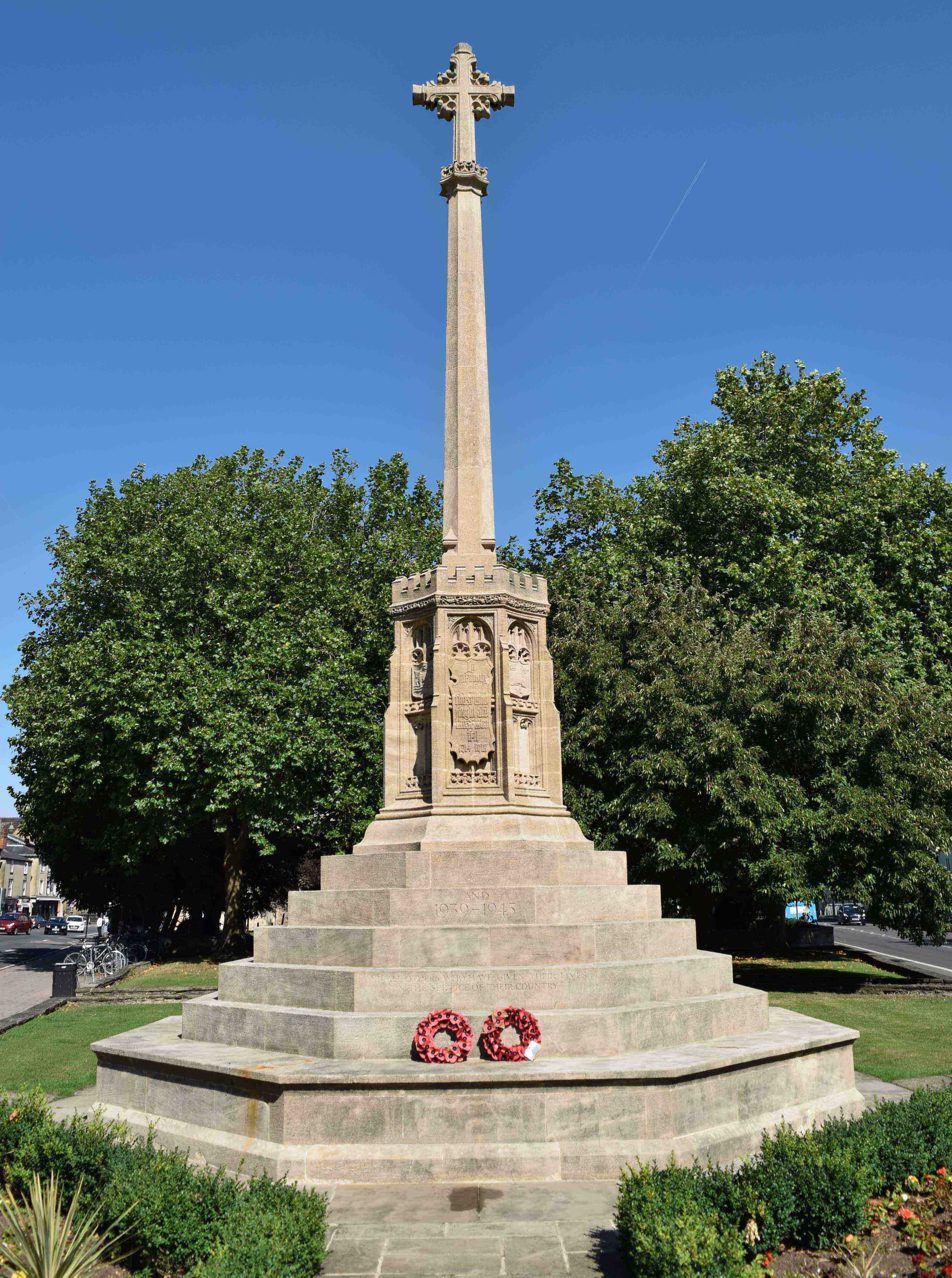
The Oxford War Memorial in St Giles', Oxford, designed by Thomas Rayson and unveiled in 1921

- Job architect for the new Boswell's building on the corner of Cornmarket and Broad Street (1912)
- The house Shotover Edge on Shotover Hill for Dr L. P. Jacks, the Master of Manchester College (1914)
- Council housing in Witney at Highworth Place in the Crofts, and at Hill Close on Oxford Road (1920s)
- Woodstock War Memorial, Oxfordshire (1920)
- Chester War Memorial, with Frederick Crossley (1921/2)
- Oxford War Memorial (1921)
- Civic Arts Association War Memorial
- Stanton St John War Memorial, Oxfordshire (1921)
- Forncett St Mary War Memorial, Norfolk (1921)
- Cogges War Memorial, Oxfordshire
- Witney War Memorial, Oxfordshire
- The John Player Factory, Botanic Road, Dublin, with Philip Dalton Hepworth (1923)
- St Edward's School Sanatorium, Oxford (by early 1920s)
- John Masefield’s theatre on Boars Hill, near Oxford (1924)
- Restoration of the former Plough Inn at 38 Cornmarket Street, Oxford (1925)
- Talbot House, Wellington College (1938)
- Restoration of 28 Cornmarket Street (1951)
- Headington School, Oxford, with Gilbert T. Gardner (1928–30)
- John Henry Brookes’ house at 195 The Slade, Oxford (1929)
- Roundabouts, The Ridings, Oxford (1929)
- Roebuck pub, Market Street (1938)
- Remodelling of the interior of 75 High Street, Burford, Oxfordshire
- Substantial renovations to Cote House (1949–50)
- Restoration of The Row, Oxford Road, Bletchingdon for the Oxfordshire Housing Society (1954)
- Extension at Keble College, with A.B. Knapp-Fisher (1955)
- Restoration of the Old Rectory, Epworth, Lincolnshire, the former home of John Wesley (1956)
- 18 Northmoor Road (1957)
- Extension to the Friends Meeting House, St Giles, Oxford (1958)
- Old Headington Village Hall (1959)
- Restorations of Blenheim Palace (1950s/1960s)
- Butler House, Ashhurst Way, Rose Hill, Oxford (Oxford Cottage Improvement Society sheltered accommodation) (1960)
- Two extensions to Stone's Almshouses in St Clement's, Oxford: Parson's Almshouses on the left (1960) and Mary Duncan Almshouses on the right (1964)
- Marsh Building for Mansfield College, Oxford (1962)
- Rayson House, Eden Drive, Headington, Oxford (Oxford Cottage Improvement Society sheltered accommodation) (1964)
- Restoration of Wallingford Town Hall
- The Park Estate, Stow on the Wold (1949–1960) for North Cotswold Rural District Council
- Numerous restorations to Oxfordshire churches, including Great Haseley, Cuddesdon, East Hendred, Ewelme, Fulbrook, Great Rollright, Ipsden, Lyford, Charney Bassett, North Leigh, North Moreton, Shipton-under-Wychwood, Oakley, Fyfield, Wootton by Woodstock, and in the city of Oxford St Giles' and St Peter-in-the-East
