= Church of All Saints, Sutton, Bedfordshire =

All Saints Church
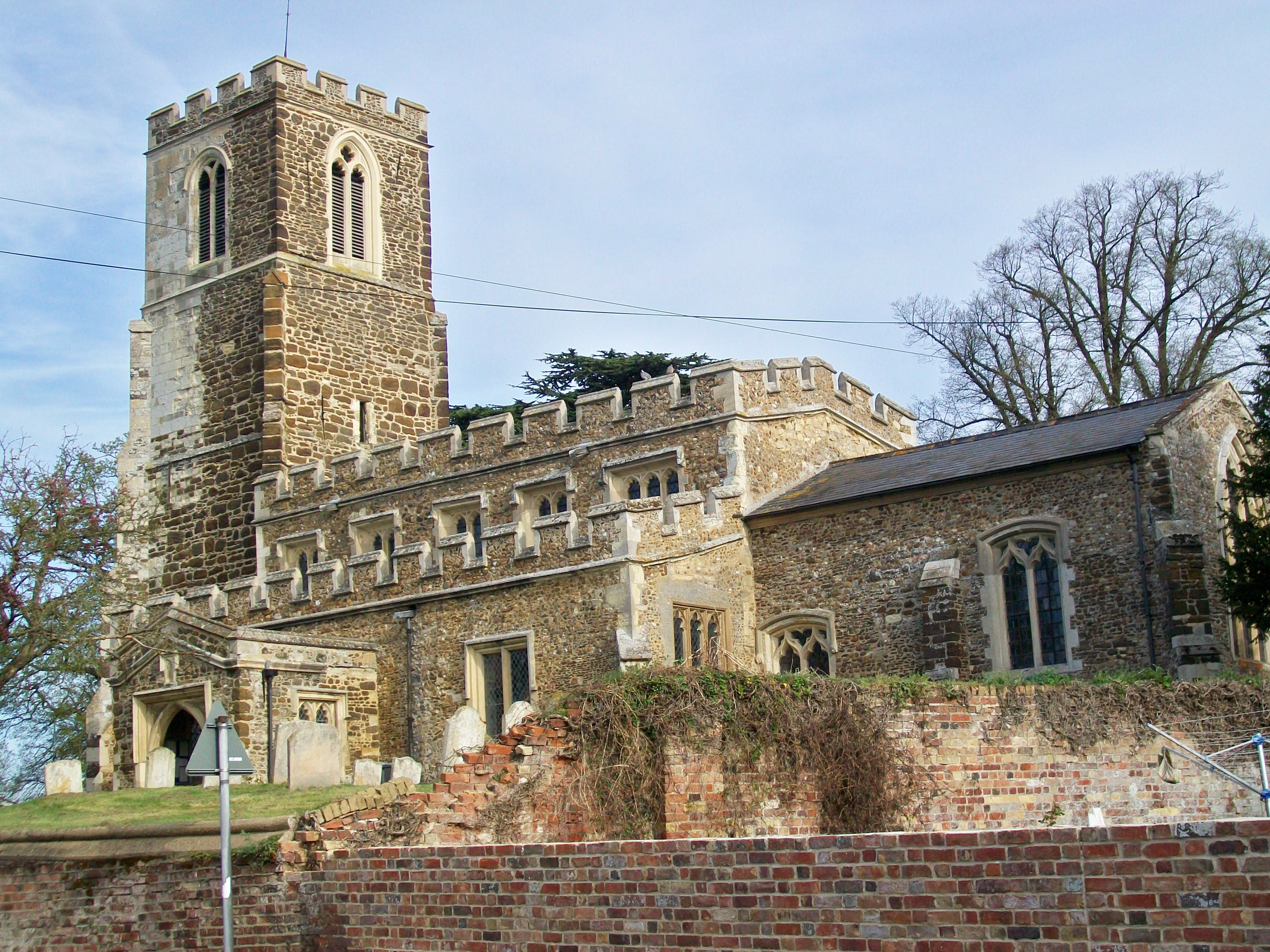
- A view of the church from Sutton High Street

- Location in Bedfordshire
- 52°06′46″N 0°13′16″W
- Location: Sutton, Bedfordshire
- Country: England
- Denomination: Church of England

History
- Status: Active

Architecture
- Heritage designation: Grade I listed
- Style: Medieval

Administration
- Diocese: St Albans
- Parish: Sutton

Church of All Saints is a Grade I listed church in Sutton, Bedfordshire, England. It became a listed building on 31 October 1966.

== See also ==
- Grade I listed buildings in Bedfordshire
