= Sutton, Bedfordshire =

Village in Bedfordshire, England

Coordinates: 52°06′40″N 0°12′46″W

Sutton
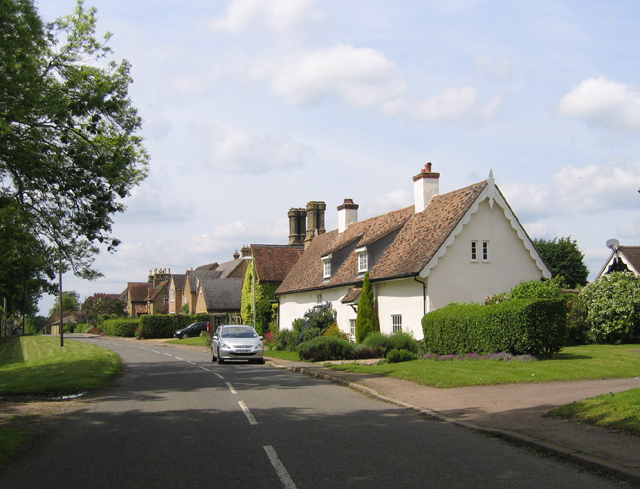
- High Street

- Location within Bedfordshire
- Population: 299 (2001 Census); 366 (2011 Census including Eyeworth)
- OS grid reference: TL222474
- Civil parish: Sutton
- Unitary authority: Central Bedfordshire
- Ceremonial county: Bedfordshire
- Region: East
- Country: England
- Sovereign state: United Kingdom
- Post town: SANDY
- Postcode district: SG19
- Dialling code: 01767
- Police: Bedfordshire
- Fire: Bedfordshire
- Ambulance: East of England
- UK Parliament: North Bedfordshire

Sutton is a rural village and civil parish in the Central Bedfordshire district of Bedfordshire, England. It lies 11 miles (18 km) east of Bedford. At the 2001 Census, its population was 299. Main features are the packhorse bridge over the Potton Brook, the adjacent ford, and the Grade I listed All Saints' Parish Church.

== Geography ==
Sutton is just over 1 mile (2 km) south of Potton, and 2.5 miles (4 km) north-east of Biggleswade.

Landscape

Natural England has designated the area as part of The Bedfordshire and Cambridgeshire Claylands (NCA 88). Central Bedfordshire Council has classified the local landscape as Dunton Clay Vale. Not technically a 'vale', it is used here to mean a transitional landscape between a valley and a plateau. Medium to large fields of cereal crops dominate the south and east of the parish. The limited woodland cover and incomplete or unhedged roads reveal an open, mostly flat or gently sloping landscape. To the west alongside the road to Deepdale are the woodlands of Millhouse Fen and Waterloo Wood, and a more recent plantation is north of the village at Pegnut Hill.

Elevation

The village centre is about 37 metres (121 ft) above sea level. The land falls to 27 metres (89 ft) at the parish's south-western boundary near Biggleswade Common and rises to 64 metres (210 ft) at its north-western corner.

Soil and geology

The soils of the parish are of four types. The lower lying land to the south-west and around Potton Brook is loamy and sandy with naturally high groundwater and a peaty surface and texture. The higher land alongside the B1040 Biggleswade Road and on to the golf courses has a sandy texture and is freely draining and slightly acid. To the north of the village are freely draining, slightly acid loamy soils. The village centre and areas to the south and east have lime-rich loamy and clayey soils with impeded drainage.

The geology of the south-west of the parish and around Potton Brook is alluvium. Western and northern areas are Lower Greensand. To the south is boulder clay and in the east is a belt of gault.

The night sky and light pollution

The Campaign to Protect Rural England (CPRE) divides the level of night sky brightness into 9 bands with band 1 being the darkest i.e. with the lowest level of light pollution and band 9 the brightest and most polluted. Sutton is in bands 3 and 4, with darker sky looking eastwards but brighter to the west.

== History ==
The first written record of the village is its listing in the Domesday Book. Spelt Sudtone and Suttone the name is thought to mean "south farm". Sutton Castle was built c1220, though now an oval motte is all that remains. Unusually, the castle is a long way from the village and church.

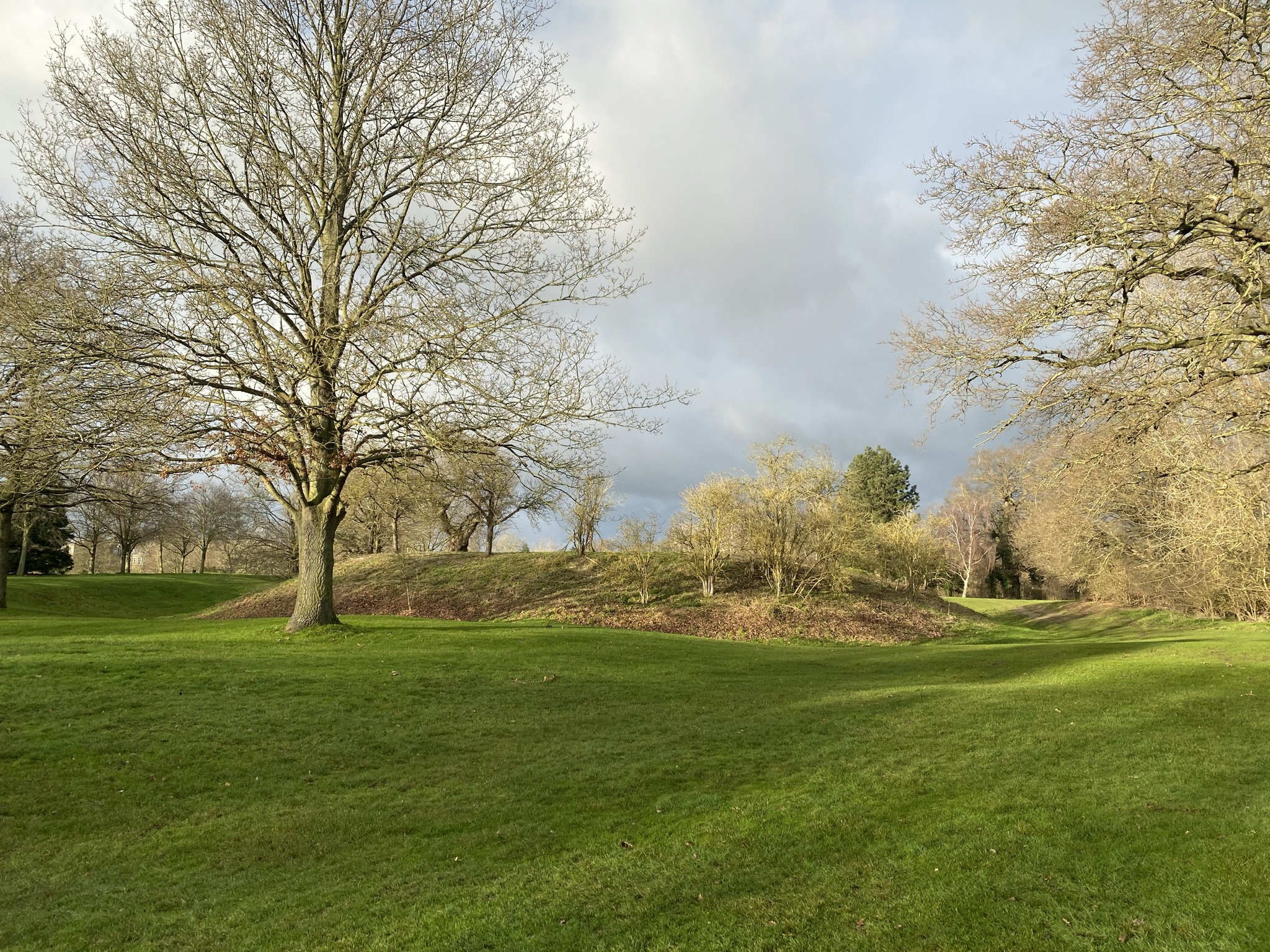
John O'Gaunt's Hill, Sutton (Bedfordshire)

John of Gaunt, 1st Duke of Lancaster, son of King Edward III, held the manor of Sutton in the 14th century. A large earthen mound surrounded by a moat, in Sutton Park, is said to be the site of his manor house. It is now the 17th green of the John O'Gaunt golf course. Local tradition tells that the village was formerly hereabout but later relocated south to its present site.

Sutton was the birthplace of General John Burgoyne the British army officer, politician and dramatist best known for his role in the American War of Independence. He lived with his family at Sutton Park. In 1741, the Sutton Enclosure Act was passed; the first Enclosure Act in Bedfordshire. Local Enclosure Acts allowed the major landowners in the area to reorganise their widely separated landholdings. This produced a larger estate for the Burgoynes. Sutton Park House was destroyed by a fire in 1825. It was subsequently re-designed in 1876. There are monuments to the Burgoynes in All Saints Church. The monument to Sir Roger, who died in 1679, is by Grinling Gibbons. The tomb of John Burgoyne (d.1709) is by Edward Stanton.

The John O'Gaunt Public House was licensed in 1835 and created from three 18th-century thatched cottages.

The Ordnance Survey map of 1900 shows a number of allotments in and to the east of the village centre.

== Packhorse bridge and ford ==
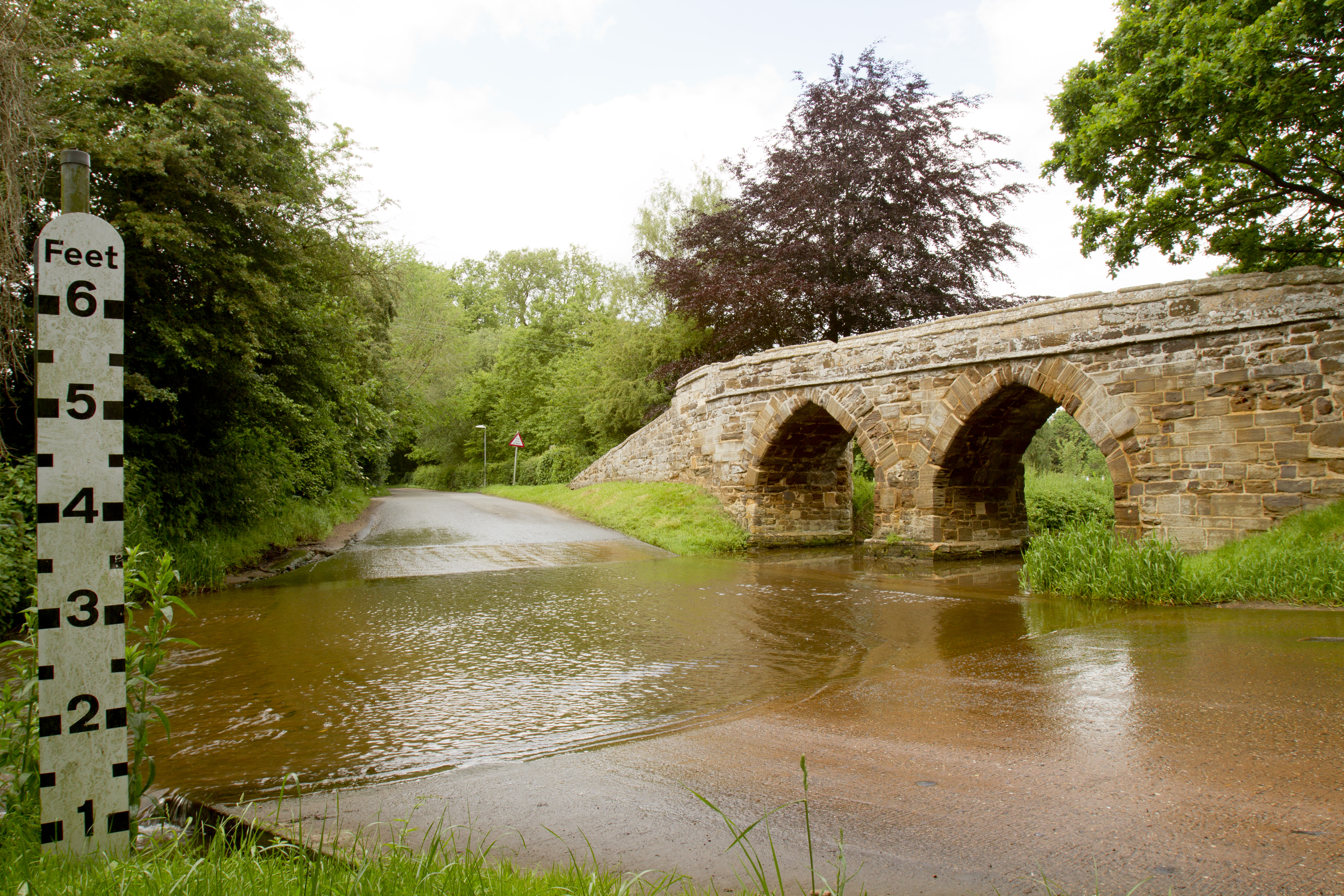
The ford and packhorse bridge in Sutton (Bedfordshire) which cross Potton Brook

The Packhorse bridge alongside the ford is a 13th-century double arched pedestrian bridge over Potton Brook, a tributary of the River Ivel.

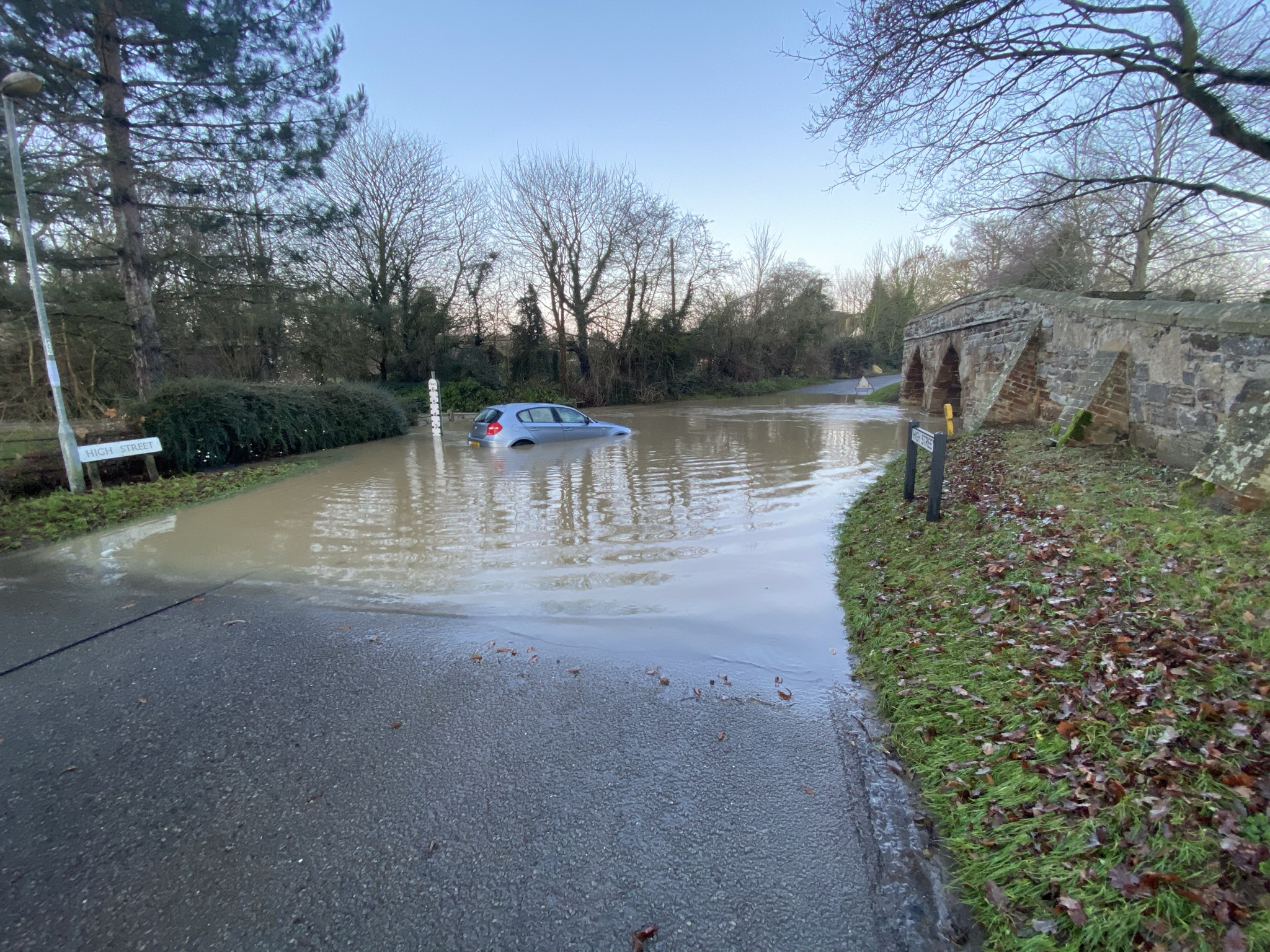
Sutton (Bedfordshire) ford in flood in December 2020

The bridge built from local sandstone is thought to be the only surviving one of its type in Bedfordshire. One source states that it was situated on an important wool trade route to the towns of Bedford and Dunstable. However, another source disputes this and is of the opinion that the bridge's origins lie with the creation of Sutton Park and the relocation of the village.

Previously in private hands, Bedfordshire County Council assumed responsibility for the bridge in 1941. Repairs carried out in 1986 earned the council a Civic Trust award in 1988.

== All Saints' parish church ==
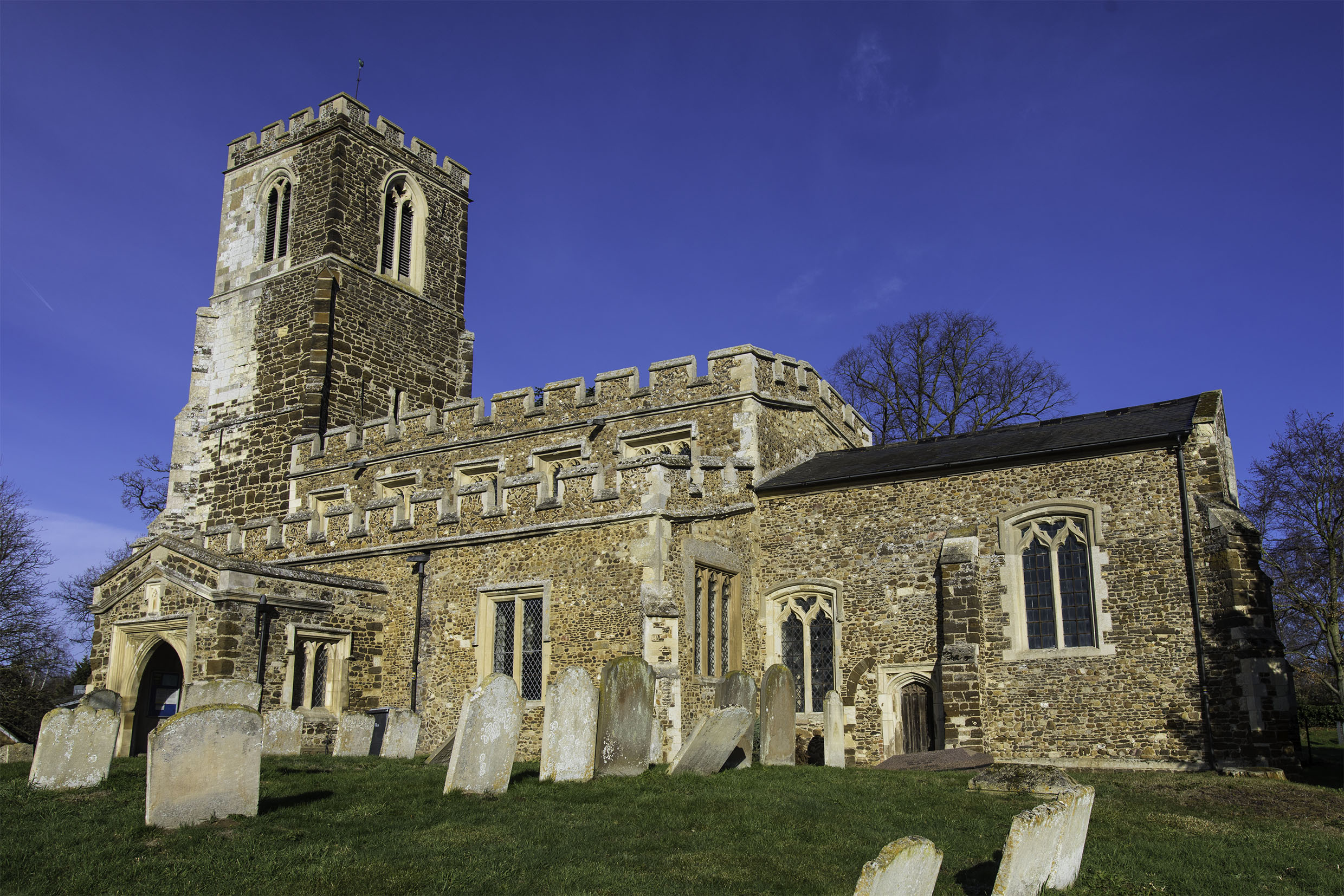
Church of All Saints, Sutton (Bedfordshire)

The Church of England parish church of All Saints has a barrel organ and was once under the control of the scandalous Reverend Edward Drax Free. A detailed study of the architecture was taken in 2003.

== Public services ==
Sutton is in the Potton Public Water Supply Zone (RW50). The water supplied by Anglian Water comes from groundwater boreholes and is chloraminated and classed as hard.

The Eastern Power Area of UK Power Networks is the distribution network operator for electricity. There is no natural gas supply.

The two nearest general hospitals are Bedford (Bedford Hospital NHS Trust) and Lister Hospital, Stevenage (East and North Hertfordshire NHS Trust). Ambulance services are provided by the East of England Ambulance Service NHS Trust. Bedfordshire Fire and Rescue Service and Bedfordshire Police cover the parish.

There is a public library in Potton.

== Public transport ==
Centrebus (South) runs bus route no. 190 south to Biggleswade (journey time 14 minutes) and north to Potton, Gamlingay, Everton and Sandy (journey time 35 minutes). The service is normally two hourly, daytime only, Monday to Saturday. The Ivel Sprinter buses run weekly services to St Neots (no. 193) and Cambridge (no. 3).

The nearest railway station is Biggleswade.

== Governance ==
Sutton Parish Council holds bi-monthly meetings in the village hall. There are seven elected councillors. Sutton is part of Potton ward for elections to the Central Bedfordshire Unitary Authority.

Prior to 1894, Sutton was administered as part of the Hundred of Biggleswade. From 1894 until 1974 the village was in Biggleswade Rural District and from 1974 to 2009 in Mid Bedfordshire District.

Sutton was in the Mid Bedfordshire parliamentary constituency until 1997, then in North East Bedfordshire until 2024 and is now a part of North Bedfordshire. The elected member is Richard Fuller of the Conservative Party.

== Community events ==
A duck race along Potton Brook takes place annually in the summer. Over a thousand plastic ducks were launched in 2017. Tickets are bought to sponsor a duck and cash prizes awarded for the winning, second and third ducks to cross the finishing line. The remaining proceeds are shared between Sutton Village Hall and All Saints' Church. A flower festival is held in All Saints' Church on the weekend of the duck race.

== Schools ==
Sutton V.A. Primary School was opened in 1870. The school changed from a Lower School to a Primary School in 2024. The school caters for 4 to 11 year olds and has strong links to All Saints’ Church.

OneSchool, Biggleswade, which opened in 2014 also lies within the parish.

== John O'Gaunt Golf Club ==
The John O'Gaunt Golf Club comprises two 18-hole courses; the original John O'Gaunt and the later Carthagena. The club was established in 1948 in Sutton Park. The clubhouse dates from 1856.

== Notable people ==
Edward Bowles, clergyman and author was baptised in Sutton in 1613.
