= Edward M. Bowles =

American college football player and coach (1871–1896)

Biographical details
- Born: August 10, 1871
- Died: March 11, 1896 (aged 24); Lebanon, New Hampshire, U.S.

Playing career
- 1893–1895: Dartmouth
- Position: Guard

Coaching career (HC unless noted)
- 1895: Bates

Edward Manson "Big" Bowles (August 10, 1871 – March 11, 1896) was an American college football player and coach who played for Dartmouth College and coached at Bates College.

Bowles was a starting guard for the Dartmouth football team from 1893 to 1895. He competed in the hammer throw for the track and field team at Dartmouth during his sophomore year. During his final season at Dartmouth, in 1895, Bowles was also the head football coach at Bates College. He died at his home in Lebanon, New Hampshire on March 11, 1896 from appendicitis.
