= Chapel of St Mary at Smith Gate =

Former chapel in Oxford, England

Chapel of St Mary
- Chapel of St Mary the Virgin at Smith Gate
- Octagonal Chapel
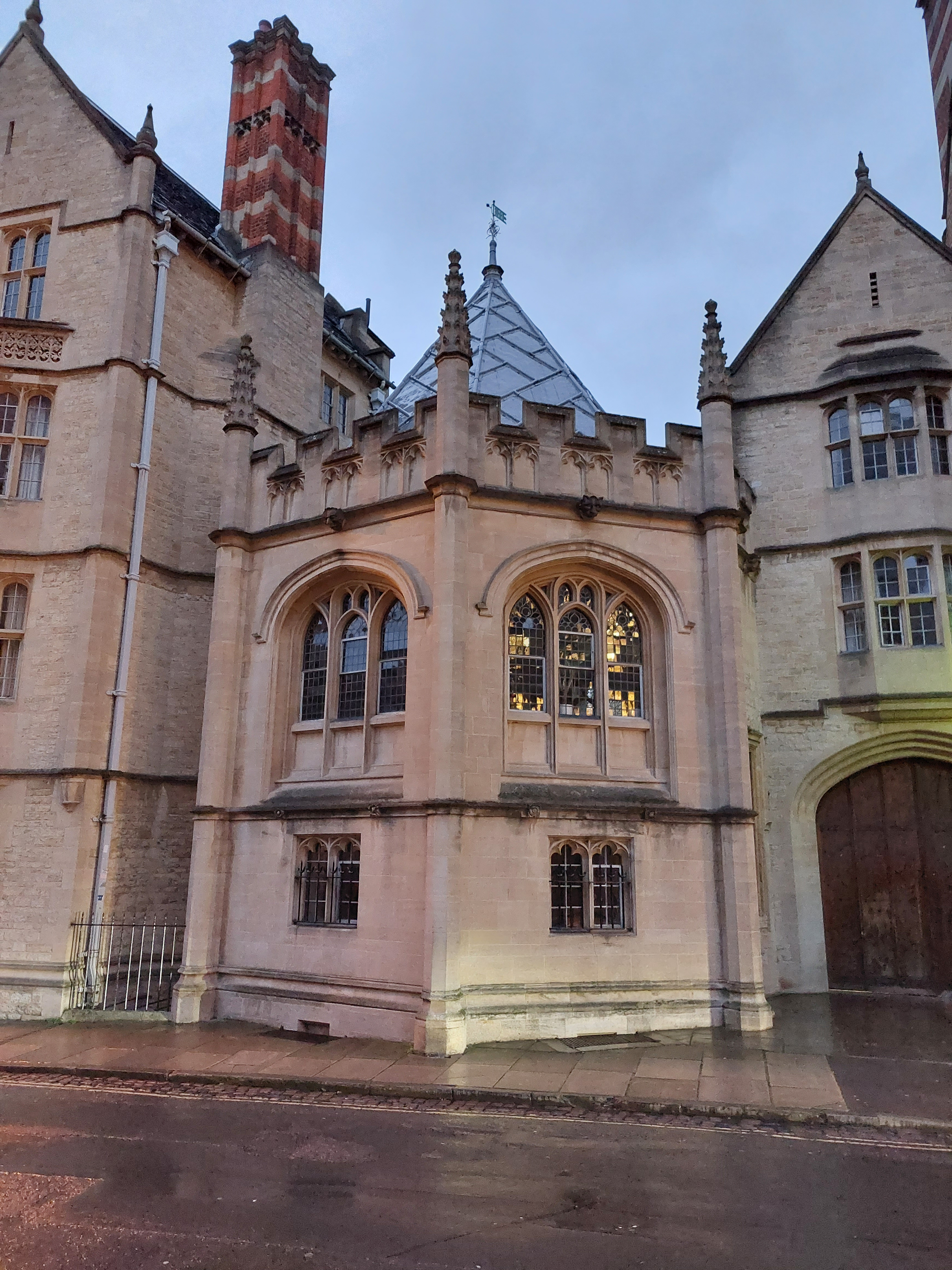
- View of the chapel from Catte Street
- Chapel of St Mary
- 51.7547090°N 1.2540970°W
- OS grid reference: SP 51583 06487
- Location: Catte Street, Oxford
- Address: Hertford College, Oxford OX1 3BW
- Country: England
- Denomination: Christian

History
- Former name(s): Chapel of Our Lady at Smith Gate; St Catherine's Chapel
- Status: Closed
- Founded: 1520
- Dedication: St Mary

Architecture
- Functional status: Common room for Hertford College
- Heritage designation: Grade II listed building
- Designated: 12 January 1954
- Architectural type: Chapel
- Style: Gothic
- Completed: 1520
- Closed: 1537

Specifications
- Materials: Stone

Administration
- District: Oxfordshire
- Diocese: Oxford
- Parish: Oxford St Mary the Virgin with St Cross and St Peter-in-the-East

The octagonal Chapel of St Mary at Smith Gate is a former chapel in Oxford, England, now part of Hertford College. It is located on Catte Street, opposite the Clarendon Building.

== History ==
The first chapel of St Mary at Smith Gate already existed in the late 14th century, originally known as the Chapel of Our Lady at Smith Gate. It was just north of the Oxford city wall, but was part of the defences of the Smith Gate, at the junction of Catte Street and New College Lane. Students prayed at the chapel before their disputations at the Divinity School. In 1366, it was described as the little tower of Smith Gate with the statue of the Virgin on it.

In 1520, the chapel was rebuilt, reputedly by William de Hyberdine of Canterbury College. It became unused in 1537 and was thus deconsecrated, with statues and a reredos moved to St Peter-in-the-East. In 1575, Queen Elizabeth I granted the building to John Herbert and Andrew Palmer. However, this did not take effect and in 1583, the city leased the building to Henry Toldervey as a house, with the land behind it.

The building was also known as St Catherine's Chapel, due to the figure over the entrance. In March 1844, Mr Rooke of Oriel College informed the Oxford Architectural Society that the figure was actually St Mary. Nonetheless, as St Catherine's Hall, the building lent its name to a society for non-collegiate students which developed into St Catherine's College.

In 1898, the city exchanged the building with George Fisher for a house in St Aldate's. During 1894–1923, the building was used as a shop, including by the Holywell Press. It was designated as 29 Broad Street. In 1923, the building became part of Hertford College. It has been restored by the college and integrated into its New Quad, connected to the older part of the college by the Bridge of Sighs.

In 1954, the building was Grade II listed.

The building now serves as the Middle Common Room (MCR) for graduates at Hertford College in the New Quad, with a kitchen below.

== See also ==
- University Church of St Mary the Virgin, at the southern end of Catte Street
