= Holywell Press =

Printing and publishing company based in Oxford, England

Coordinates: 51.74822°N 1.27822°W

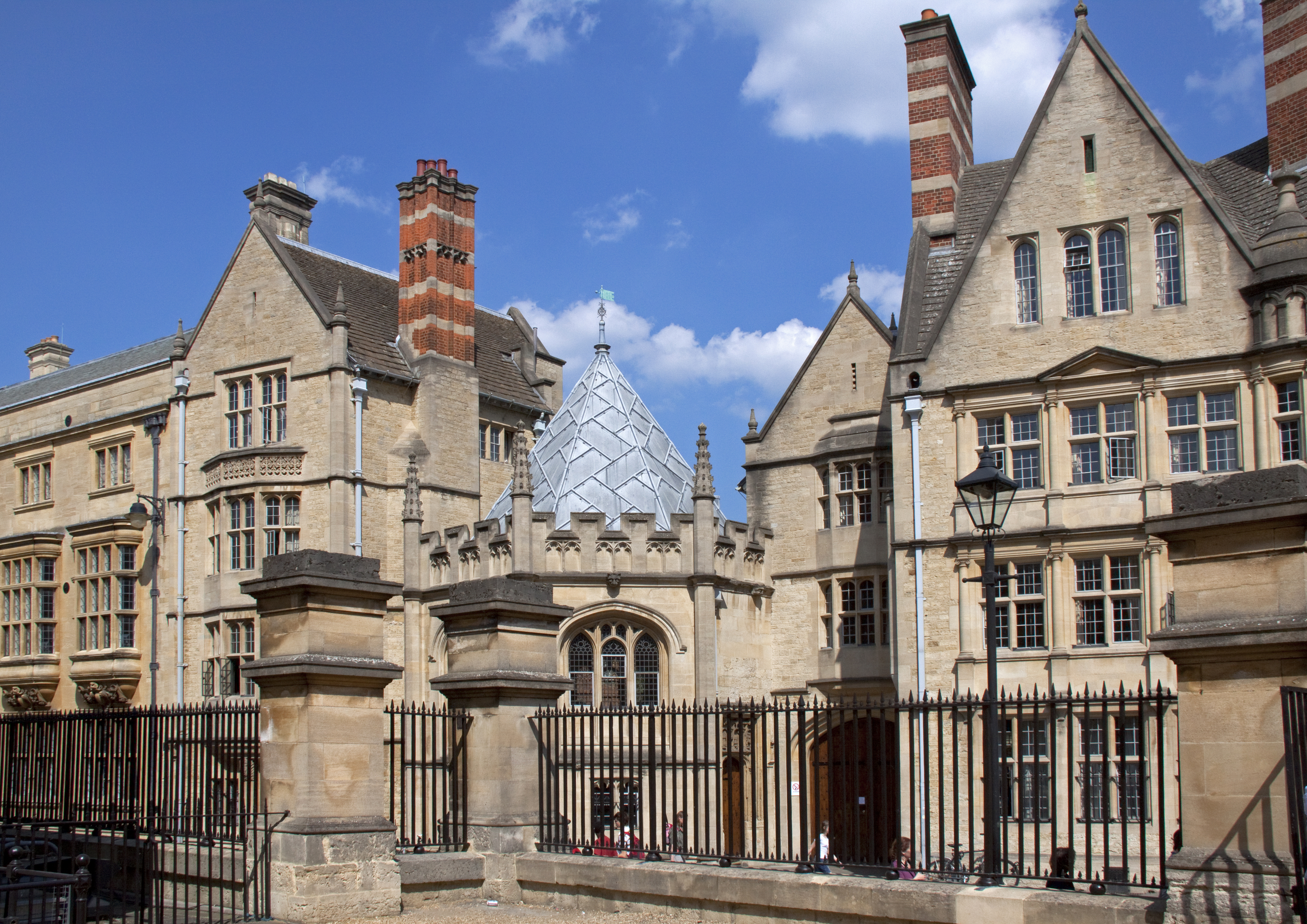
- The former octagonal Chapel of St Mary at Hertford College, the first location of the Holywell Press
- Founded: 1890
- Founders: Harry Burrows; Thomas Doe
- Country of origin: United Kingdom
- Headquarters location: Oxford, England
- Key people: Benjamin Burrows
- Owner(s): Burrows family
- Official website: holywellpress.com

Holywell Press Ltd is a family printing and publishing company based in Oxford, England.

The firm was established in 1890 by Harry Burrows and Thomas Doe. A major customer has been the University of Oxford, including publication of the university student magazine Isis for many years. It also produced early advertising for Morris cars. Harry Burrows was a personal friend of the founder William Morris (later Lord Nuffield).

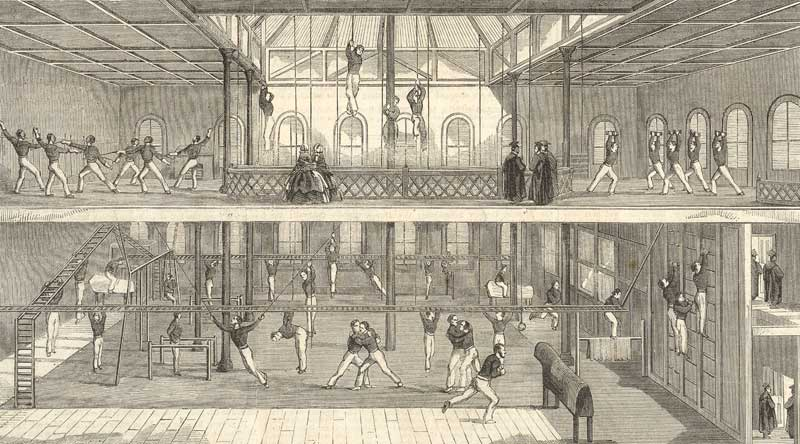
The Maclaren Gymnasium, Alfred Street, location of the Holywell Press from 1920 to 1989

The company took its name from the Holywell Room in Oxford. Initially, the company premises were in the octagonal former Chapel of St Mary at the junction of Broad Street and Catte Street, now part of Hertford College. In 1920/1, it moved to the Maclaren Gymnasium in Alfred Street, with much more room for printing. In 1989, it moved to a purpose-built factory building in Ferry Hinksey Road, at Osney Mead in west Oxford. The company has been run by the Burrows family throughout its existence, most recently by Benjamin Burrows.

The Holywell Press helps with branding, for example, the Oxford-based stone carver Alex Wenham when he moved from France to the United Kingdom.

== Selected books ==
- Geoffrey Bolton, History of the O.U.C.C., 1962.
- A. Philippou (ed.), The Orthodox Ethos, 1964.
- Andrew S. N. Wright, The History of Buckland in the County of Berkshire, 1966.
- Humphry J. M. Bowen, The Flora of Berkshire, 1968.
