= Thomas Graham Jackson =

English architect (1835–1924)

Sir Thomas Graham Jackson Bt
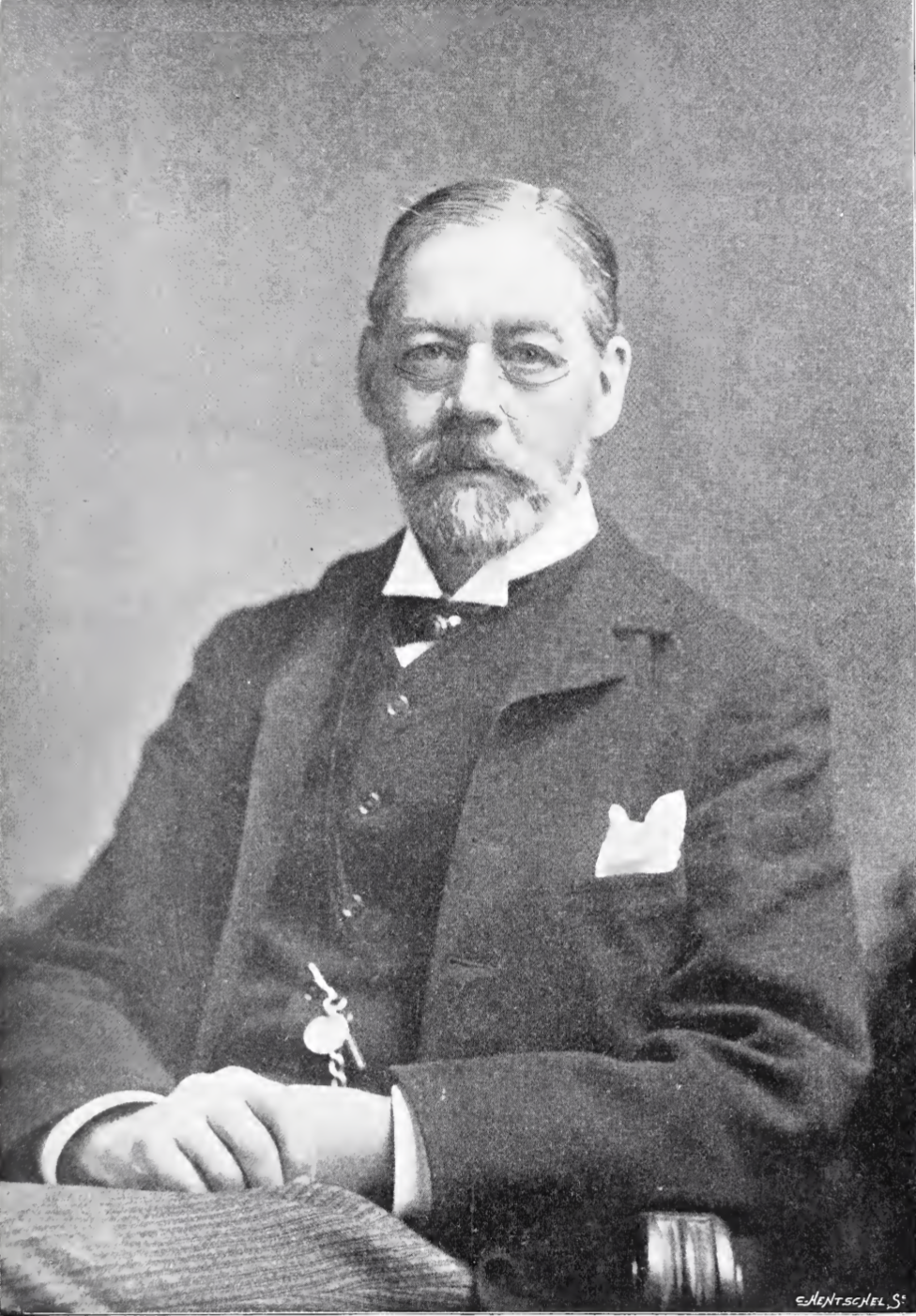
- Born: 21 December 1835; London
- Died: 17 November 1924 (aged 88)
- Occupation: Architect
- Awards: Royal Gold Medal (1910)

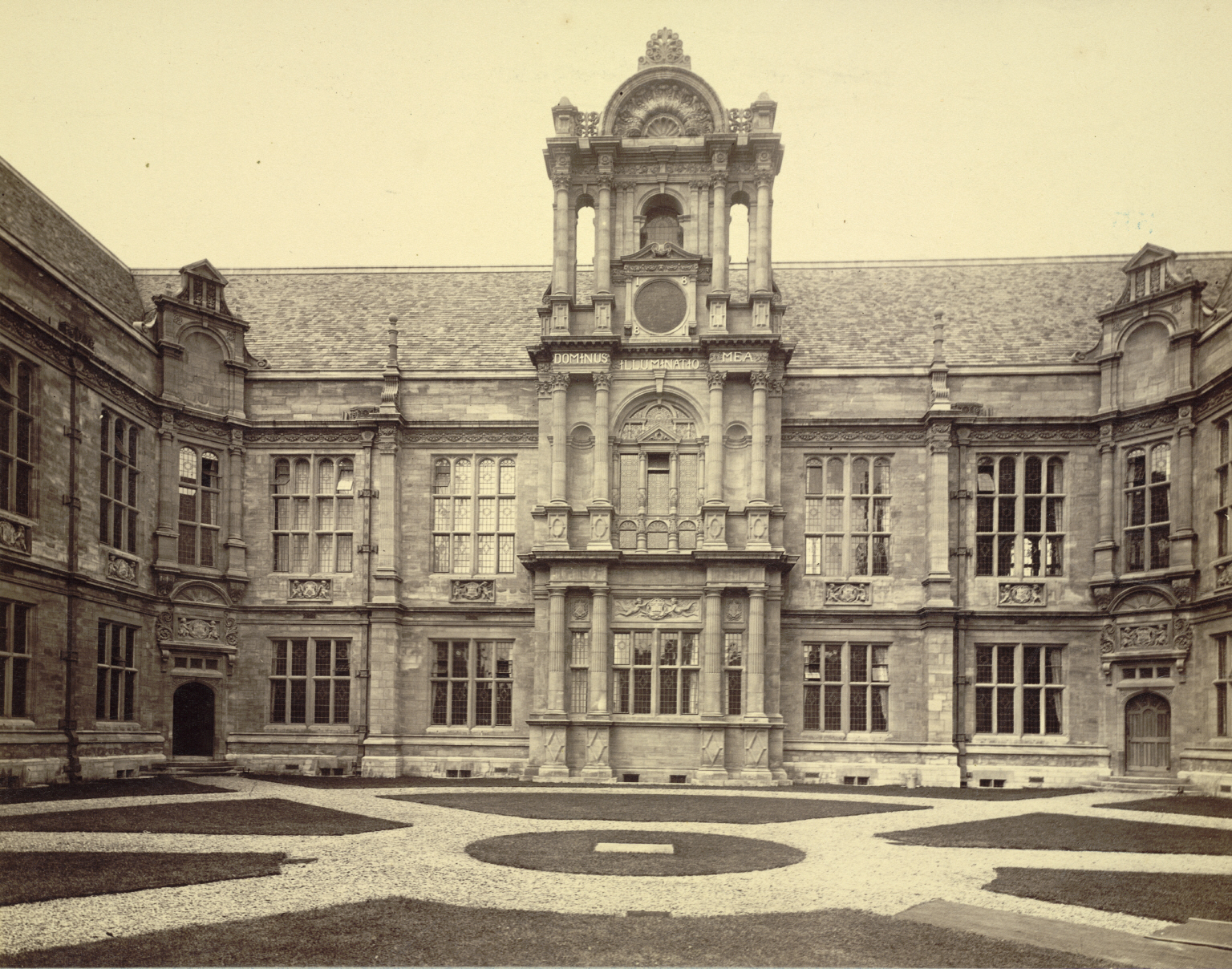
Examination Schools, Oxford

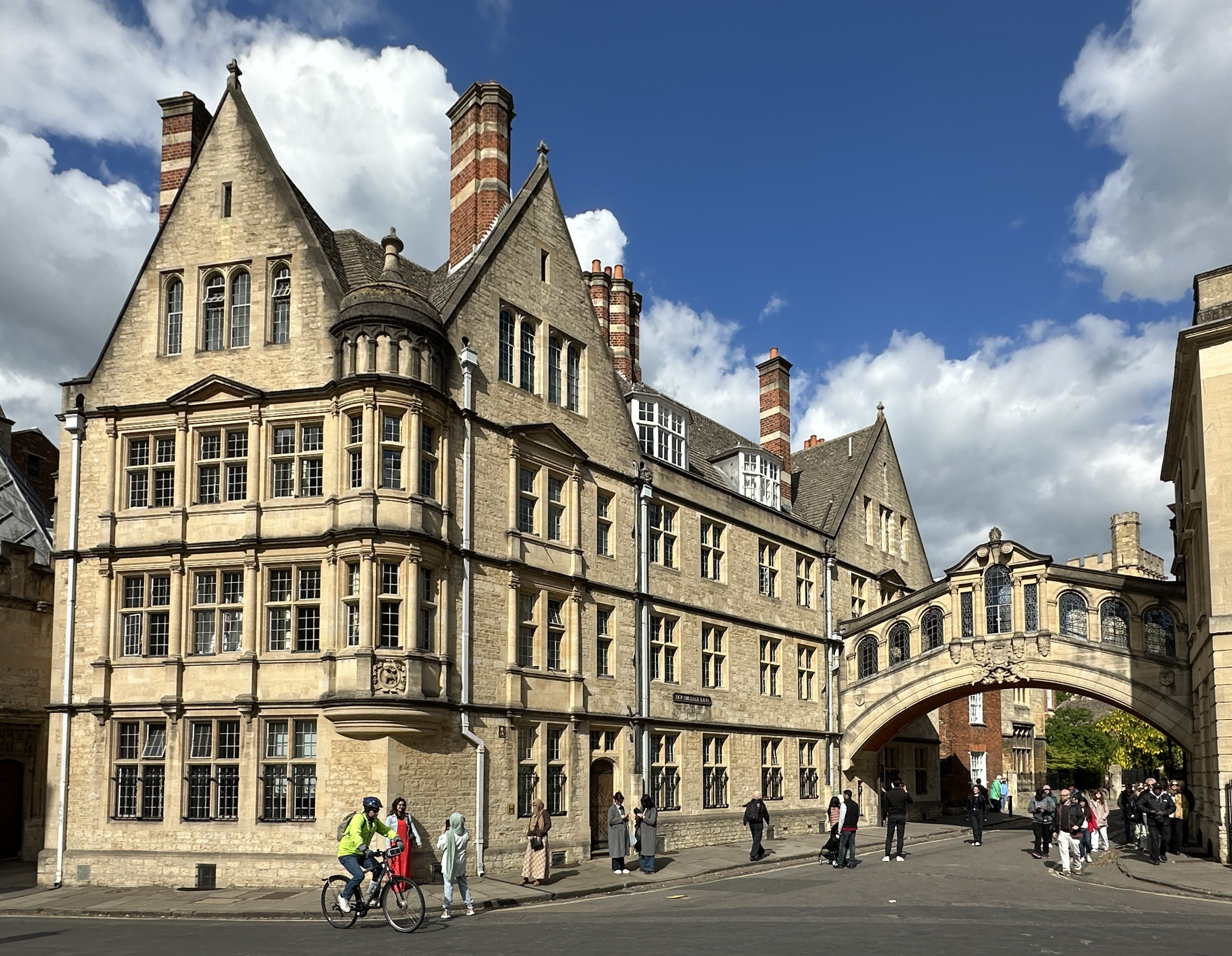
Hertford College with the Bridge of Sighs, Oxford

Sir Thomas Graham Jackson, 1st Baronet RA (21 December 1835 – 7 November 1924) was one of the most distinguished British architects of his generation. He is best remembered for his work at Oxford, including the Oxford Military College at Cowley, the university's Examination Schools, most of Hertford College (including the Bridge of Sighs over New College Lane), much of Brasenose College, ranges at Trinity College and Somerville College, the City of Oxford High School for Boys, and the Acland Nursing Home.

== Life and career ==
Jackson was born in Hampstead, but moved with his parents and sister Emily Jackson to Sevenoaks, Kent in 1872.

Much of his career was devoted to the architecture of education, and he worked extensively for various schools, notably Giggleswick and his own alma mater Brighton College. Jackson designed the former town hall in Tipperary Town, Ireland. He also worked on many parish churches and the college chapel at the University of Wales, Lampeter. He is also famous for designing the chapel (amongst other things) at Radley College.

He was educated at Brighton College and then Wadham College, Oxford, of which he wrote a history, before being articled as a pupil to Sir George Gilbert Scott.

Jackson was a prolific author of carefully researched works in architectural history, often illustrated with sketches made during his extensive travels. Jackson's travels in Dalmatia, in which he was accompanied by his intrepid wife, would result in Dalmatia, the Quarnero and Istria with Cettigne in Montenegro and the island of Grado (3 volumes), published by the Clarendon Press, Oxford, in 1887. It remains today a fundamental source of knowledge of the geography, art, architecture and social life of Dalmatia in those years.

He and Norman Shaw edited Architecture, A Profession or an Art published in 1892, to which William H. White replied by publishing The Architect and his artists, an essay to assist the public in considering the question is architecture a profession or an art.

This had been part of the course of events which resulted in the passing of the Architects (Registration) Acts, 1931 to 1938 which established the statutory Register of Architects and monopolistic restrictions on the use of the vernacular word "architect", imposed with threat of penalty on prosecution for infringement.

In 1889, Jackson was elected as a member of the Art Workers' Guild, and went to be elected Master of the Guild in 1896. In 1892, he was elected as an associate member of the Royal Academy before becoming an elected full member of the Academy in 1896, and holding roles of senior Royal Academician and treasurer.

In 1919, Jackson wrote a collection of supernatural stories, Six Ghost Stories. These stories were written under the influence of M. R. James, and Jackson expressed admiration for James's work in the book's introduction.

A stone memorial tablet to Sir Thomas was erected in the chapel of Brighton College, part of which he had built as a First World War memorial in 1922–23. For that school's chapel he had also designed many memorials during the 1880s and 1890s. The other concentrated group of mural tablets by Jackson is to be found in the antechapel of Wadham College in Oxford.

Jackson's pupils and assistants included Evelyn Hellicar.

Jackson was created a baronet, of Eagle House in Wimbledon in the County of Surrey, on 10 February 1913.

== Examples of his work ==
- Additions to increase the capacity of All Saints, Botley, in 1892 and 1895
- Emily Jackson Children's Hip Hospital, Sevenoaks, c. 1900, which he designed for his sister Emily's children's hospital

== Sources ==
- Jackson, Thomas Graham (2003). Nicholas Jackson (ed.). Recollections: The life and travels of a Victorian architect. James Bettley. London: Unicorn Press. ISBN 0-906290-72-4.
- Jones, Martin D.W. (1991). Gothic Enriched: Thomas Jackson's Mural Tablets in Brighton College Chapel in Church Monuments VI. pp. 54–66.
- Kidd, Charles; Williamson, David, eds. (1990). Debrett's Peerage and Baronetage (1990 ed.). New York: St. Martin's Press.
- Leigh Rayment's list of baronets
- Whyte, William (2006). Oxford Jackson: Architecture, education, status, and style, 1835–1924. Oxford: Clarendon Press. ISBN 0-19-929658-8.

Baronetage of the United Kingdom
New creation	Baronet (of Eagle House); 1913–1924	Succeeded by Hugh Nicholas Jackson
