= Bridge of Sighs, Oxford =

Hertford Bridge
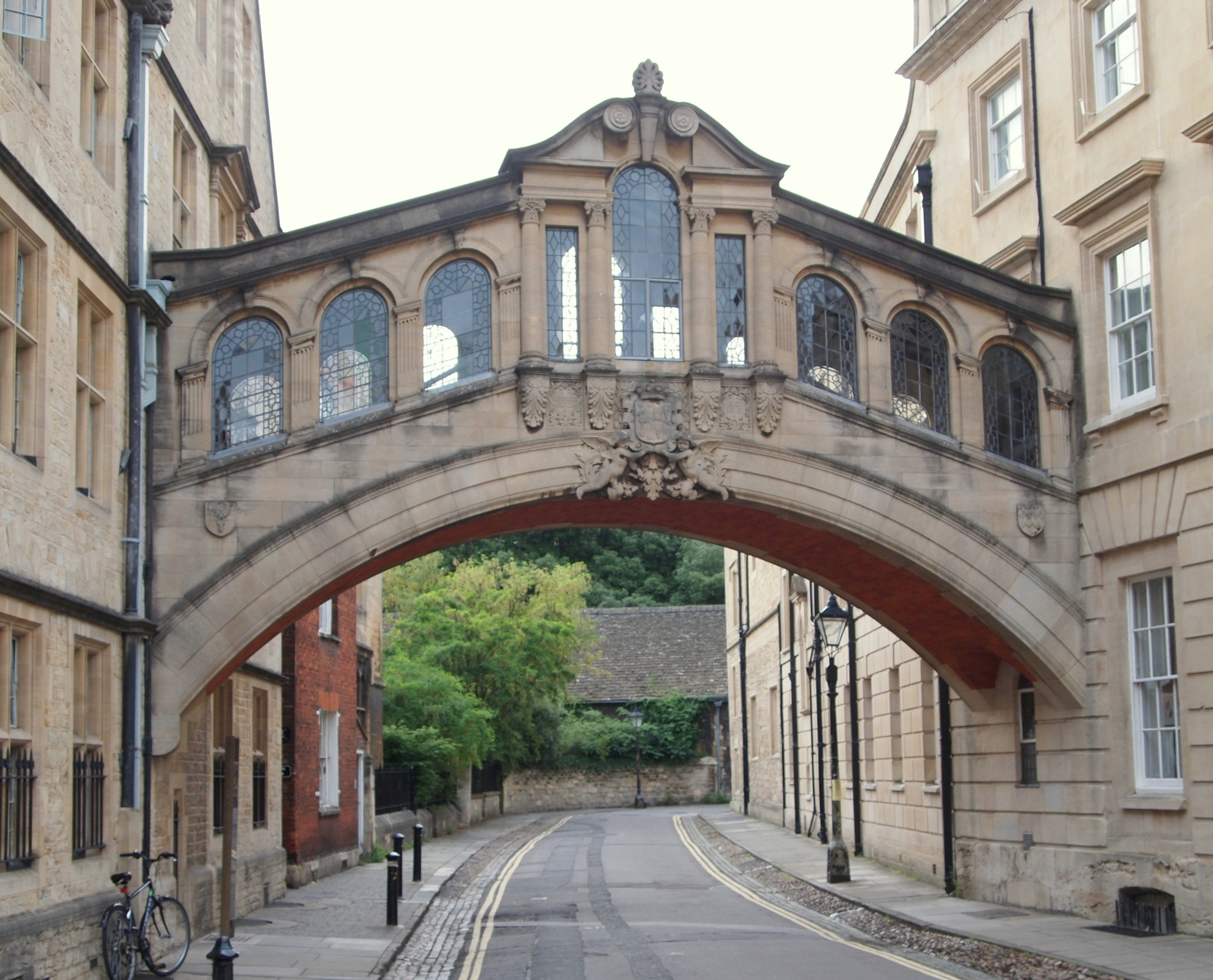
- Hertford Bridge from Catte Street

- Location within Oxford city centre
- Alternative names: Bridge of Sighs

General information
- Type: Covered bridge
- Location: Hertford College, Oxford
- Coordinates: 51.75447°N 1.25389°W
- Completed: 1914

Design and construction
- Architect: Thomas Graham Jackson

Hertford Bridge, often called the Bridge of Sighs, is a skyway joining two parts of Hertford College over New College Lane in Oxford, England. Its distinctive design makes it a city landmark.

== Misnomer and myth ==
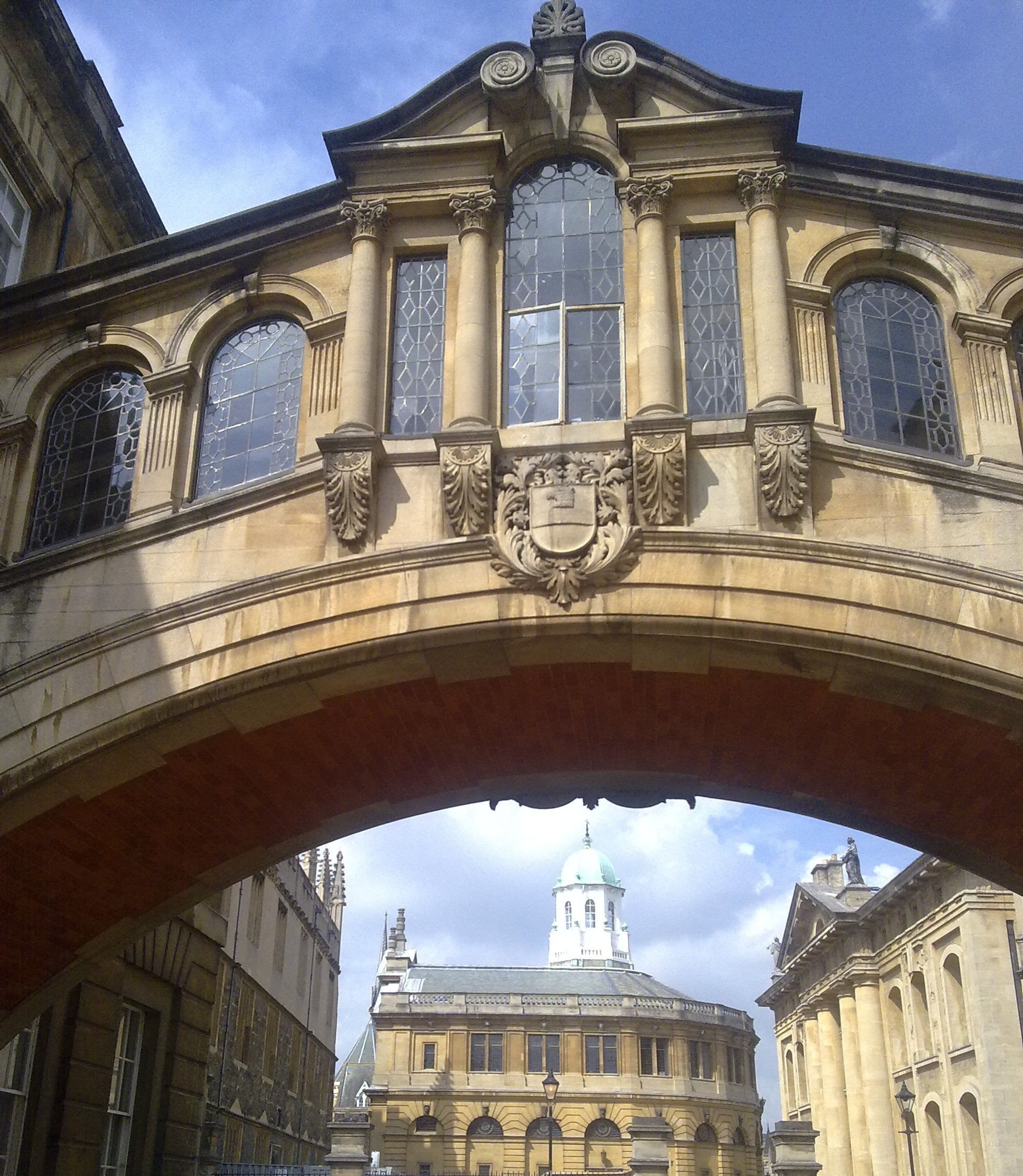
Hertford Bridge, looking towards Catte Street, with the Sheldonian Theatre in the background

The bridge is often referred to as the Bridge of Sighs because of its supposed similarity to the better known Bridge of Sighs in Venice.

There is a false legend saying that many decades ago, a survey of the health of students was taken, and as Hertford College's students were the heaviest, the college closed off the bridge to force them to take the stairs, giving them extra exercise. However, if the bridge is not used, the students actually climb fewer stairs than if they do use the bridge.

== Building ==
The bridge links together the Old and New Quadrangles of Hertford College (to the south and the north respectively), and much of its current architecture was designed by Sir Thomas Jackson. It was completed in 1914, despite its construction being opposed by New College.

The building on the southern side of the bridge houses the college's administrative offices, whereas the northern building is mostly student accommodation. The bridge is always open to members of the college, who can often be seen crossing it. The bridge is Grade II listed.

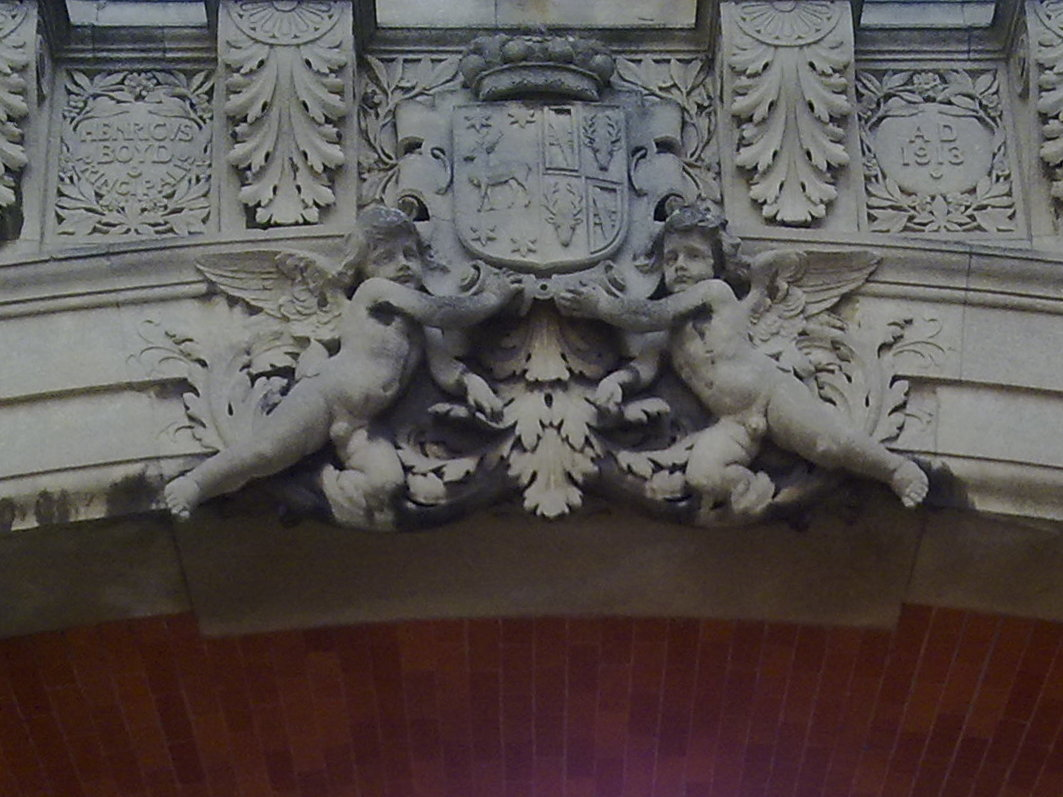
A close up of the coat of arms on Hertford Bridge

== See also ==
- Bridge of Sighs, Cambridge
- Logic Lane covered bridge, at University College, Oxford
