= Catte Street =

Street in central Oxford, England

Coordinates: 51.7543°N 1.2540°W

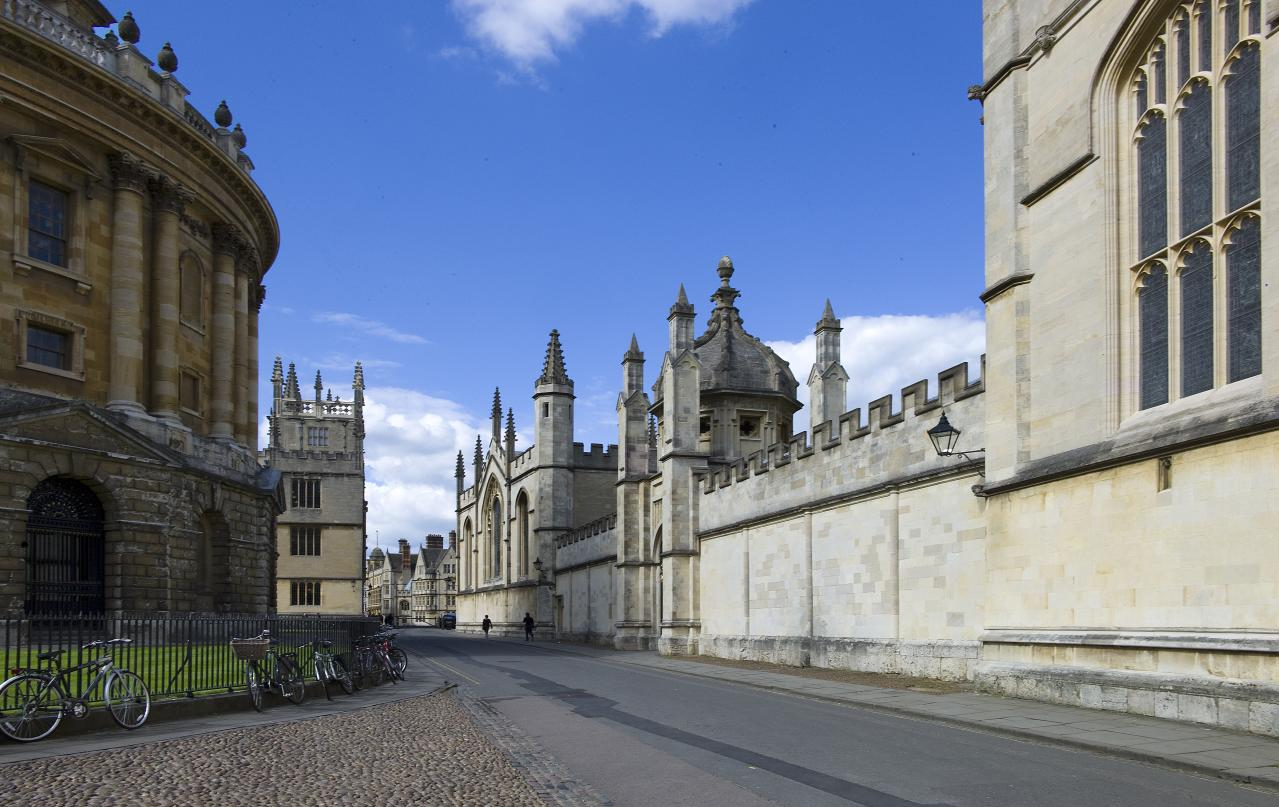
Looking north along Catte Street past the Radcliffe Camera and All Souls College

Catte Street is a historic street in central Oxford, England.

== Location ==
Catte Street runs north–south, continuing as Parks Road to the north (beyond a junction with Broad Street and Holywell Street). The street passes along the eastern side of Radcliffe Square and forms a junction with the High Street to the south.

At the northern end to the west is the Clarendon Building on Broad Street, with the Sheldonian Theatre nearby. Just to the south is the Bodleian Library. To the east are the Oxford Martin School (formerly the Indian Institute building), the octagonal former Chapel of St Mary at Smith Gate, now the Middle Common Room of Hertford College, and the Bridge of Sighs over New College Lane, which is also part of Hertford College, connecting the New Quad of the college to the north.

Further south on the east side is All Souls College, a college with Fellows but no undergraduate students. To the west at the southern end are the Radcliffe Camera and the University Church of St Mary the Virgin, the main church of the University, on the High Street. The southern end of the street, by the junction with the High Street, between the University Church and All Souls College, is pedestrianised.

== History ==
The name of this street was recorded as Kattestreete in the early 13th century, as Mousecatchers' Lane (Vicus Murilegorum) in 1442, and as Cat Street in the 18th century. In the mid-19th century it became Catherine Street. However, there was another street of this name in east Oxford and in 1930 the City Council changed the name to Catte Street, using a 15th-century spelling.

Originally this street used to lead northwards as far as New College Lane, where the old Oxford city wall blocked its way. The road north from here has become part of Catte Street, although the former Indian Institute Building still gives its address as Broad Street nearby.

In the mid-13th century, the illuminator William de Brailes owned property, and presumably had his workshop, next to St Mary's.

The street was pedestrianised as a pavement at the south end by the junction with the High Street in 1973.

== Cultural associations ==
Catte Street is mentioned in Philip Pullman's fictional works, His Dark Materials trilogy and Lyra's Oxford.

The street inspired the name of a local 1970s jazz band, the "Catte Street Rhythm Wreckers".

== Gallery ==
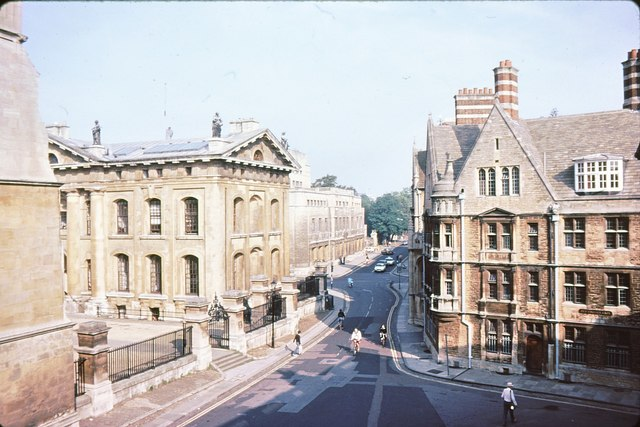
1981 photo looking north up Catte Street towards Parks Road in the distance

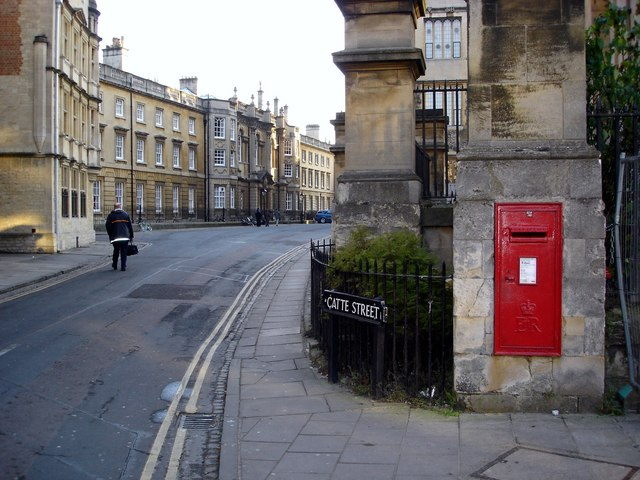
Facing south on Catte Street

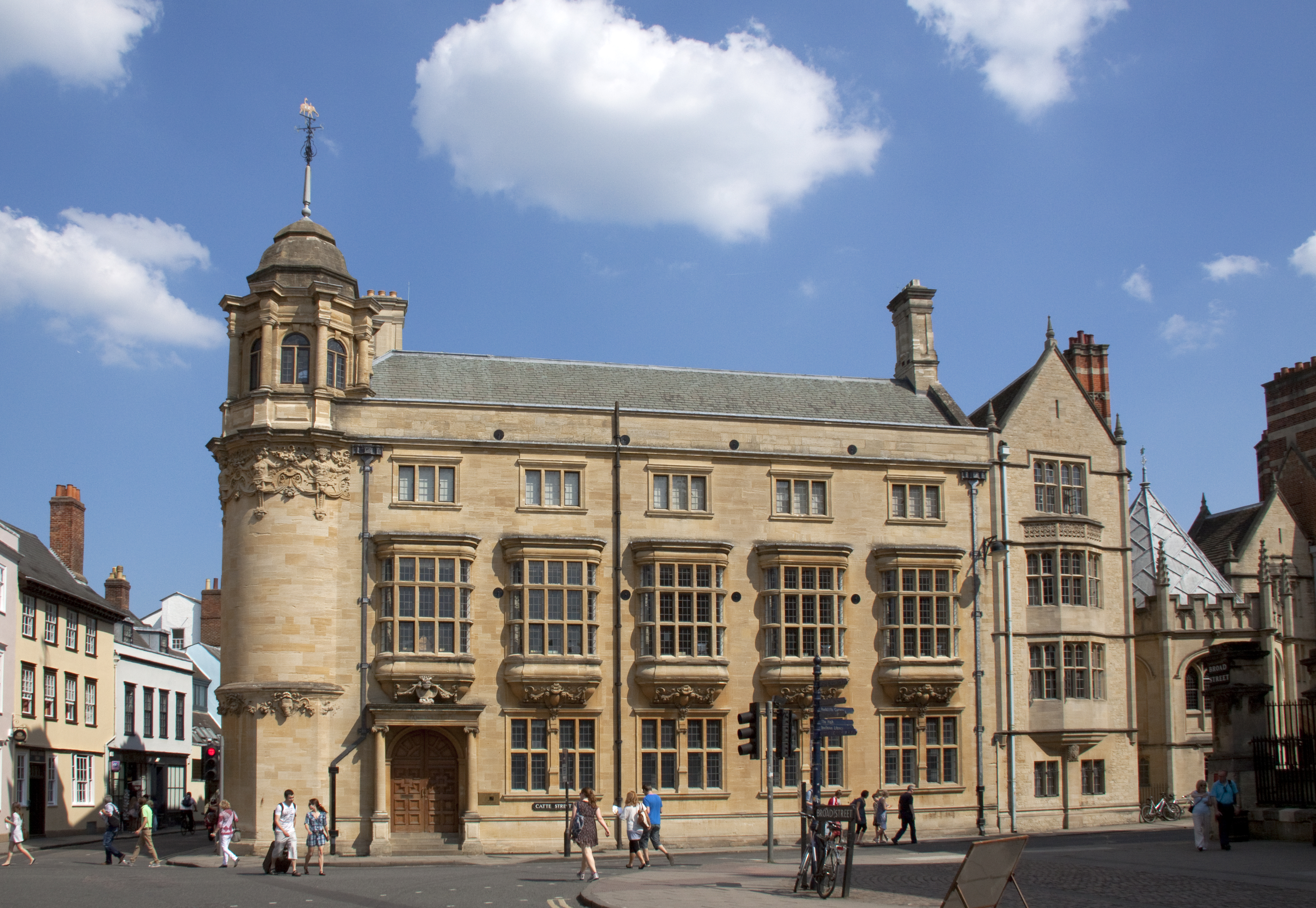
The Indian Institute at the north end of Catte Street to the east

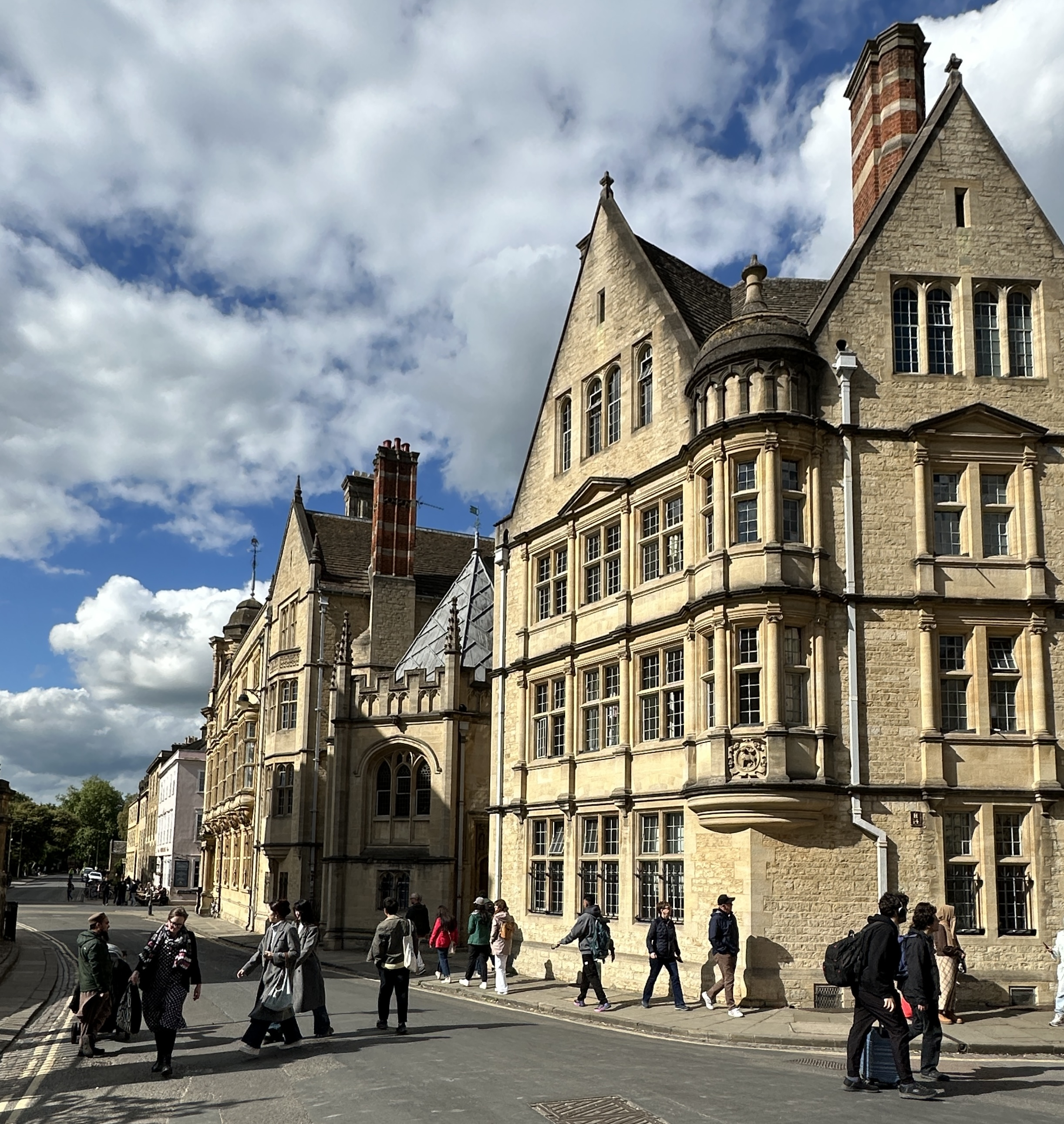
Hertford College viewed from Catte Street

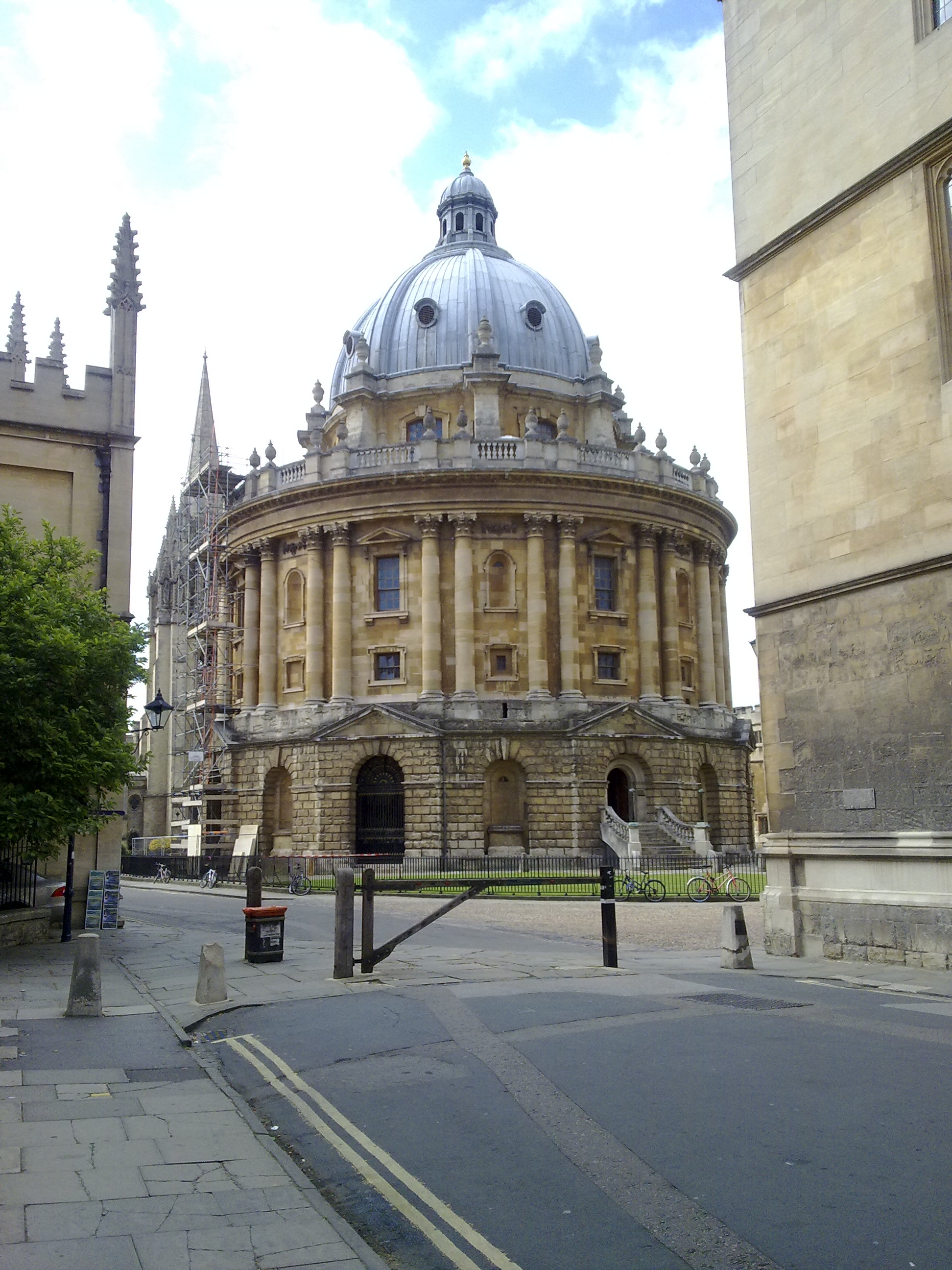
The Radcliffe Camera from Catte Street

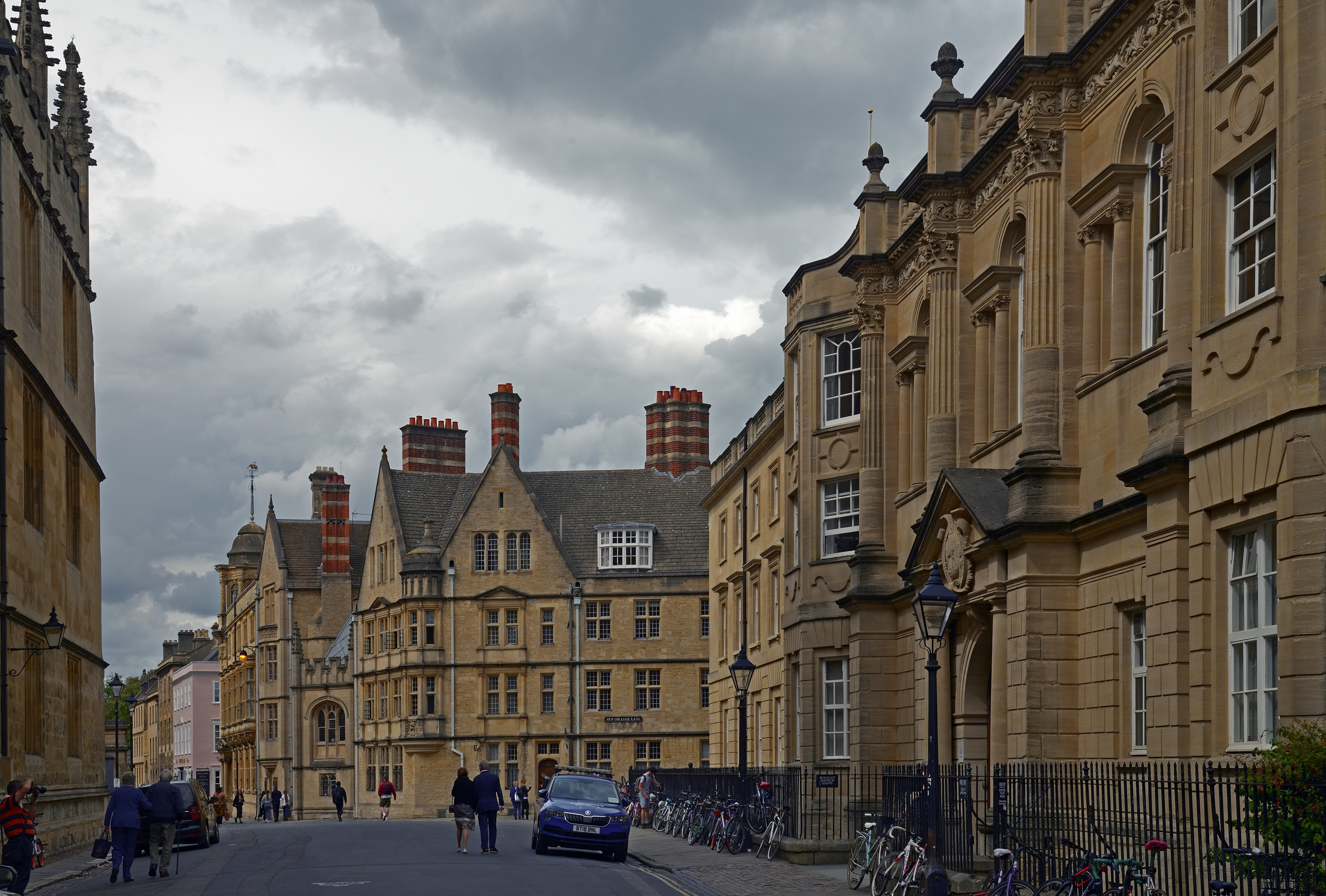
Facing north on Catte Street with Hertford College on the right

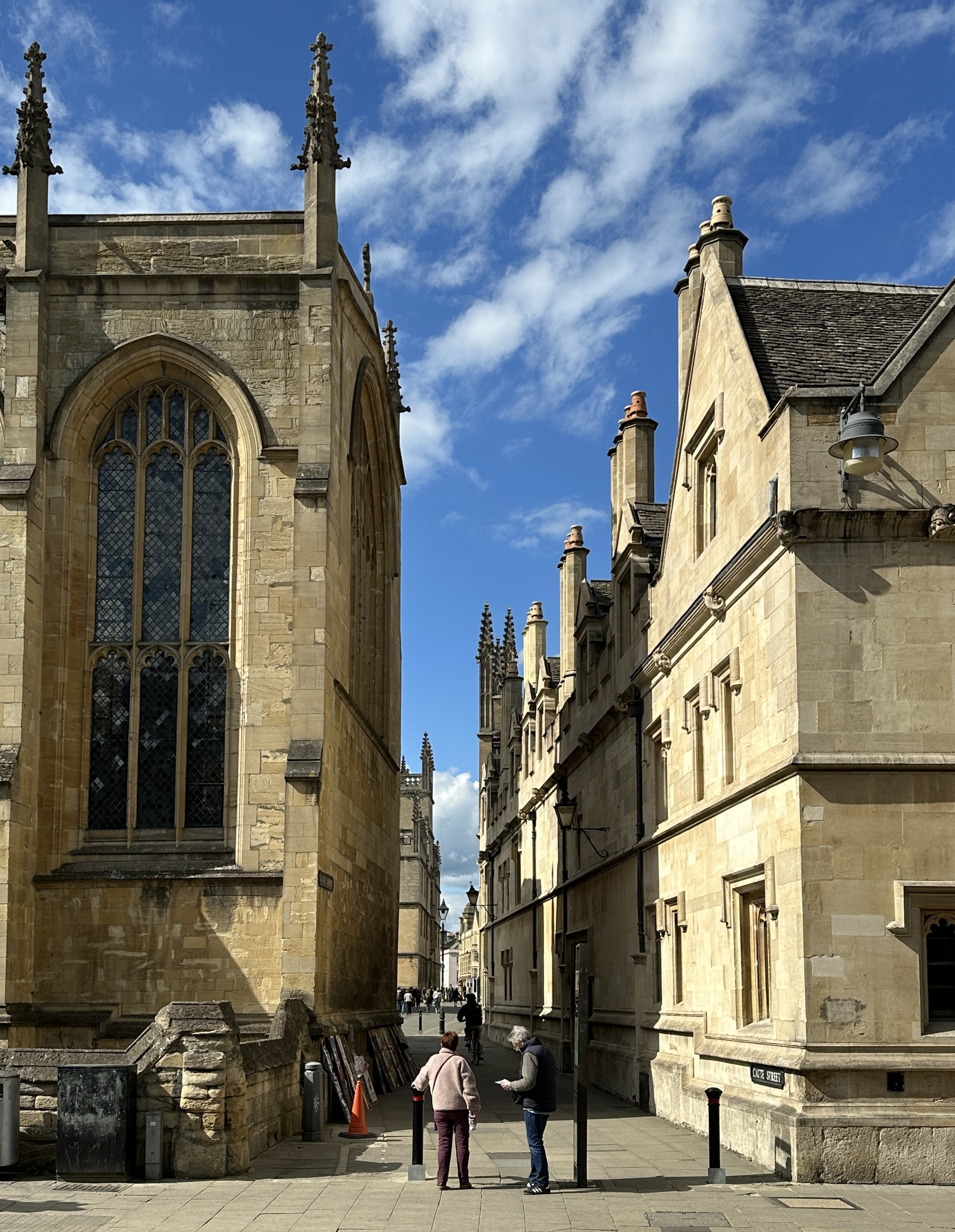
Catte Street entrance from High Street
