= New College Lane =

Street in central Oxford, England

Coordinates: 51°45′16″N 1°15′12″W

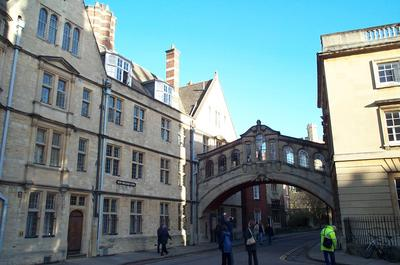
The NW end of New College Lane, including the Bridge of Sighs.

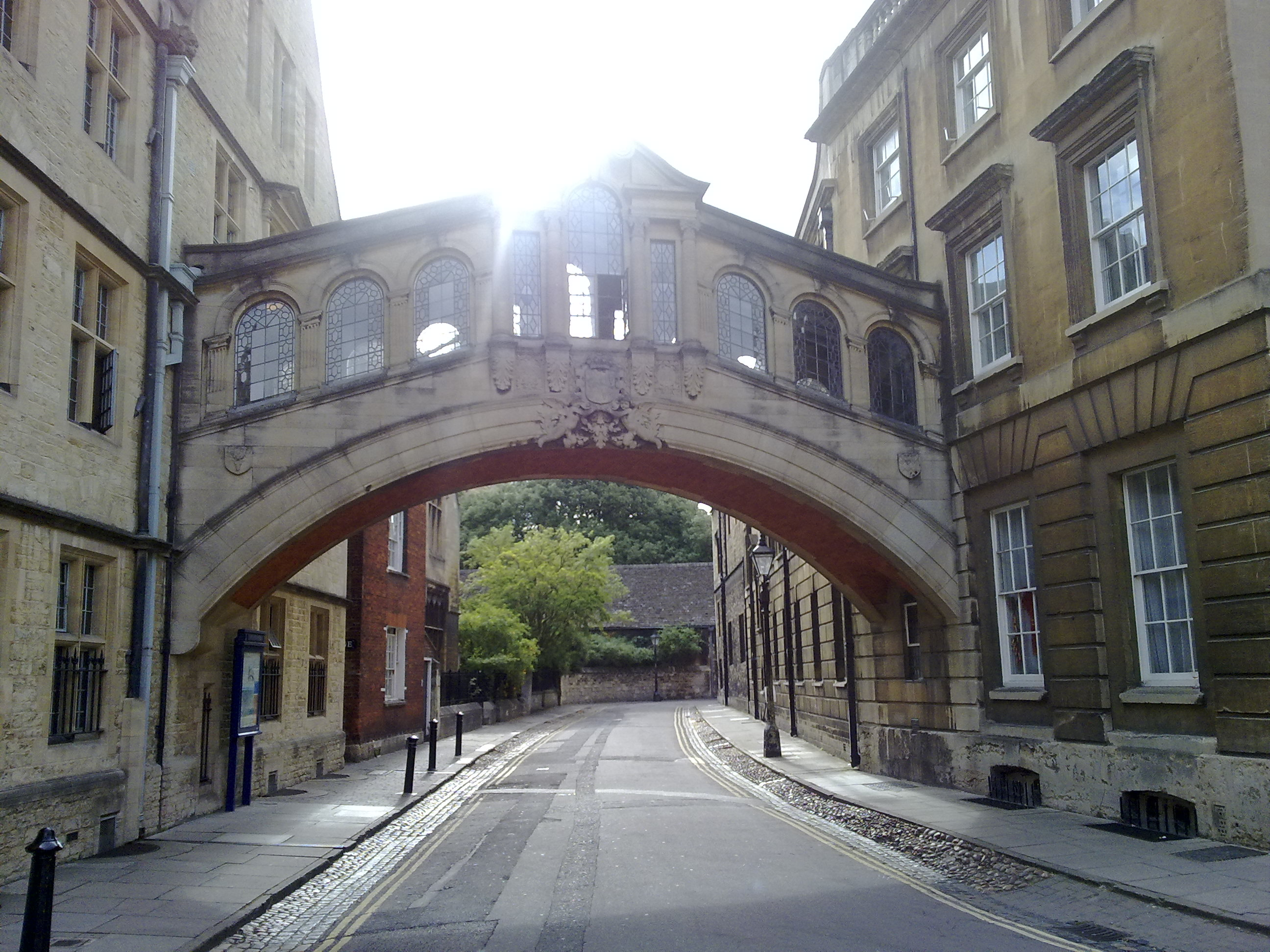
Looking into the NW end of New College Lane from its junction with Catte Street.

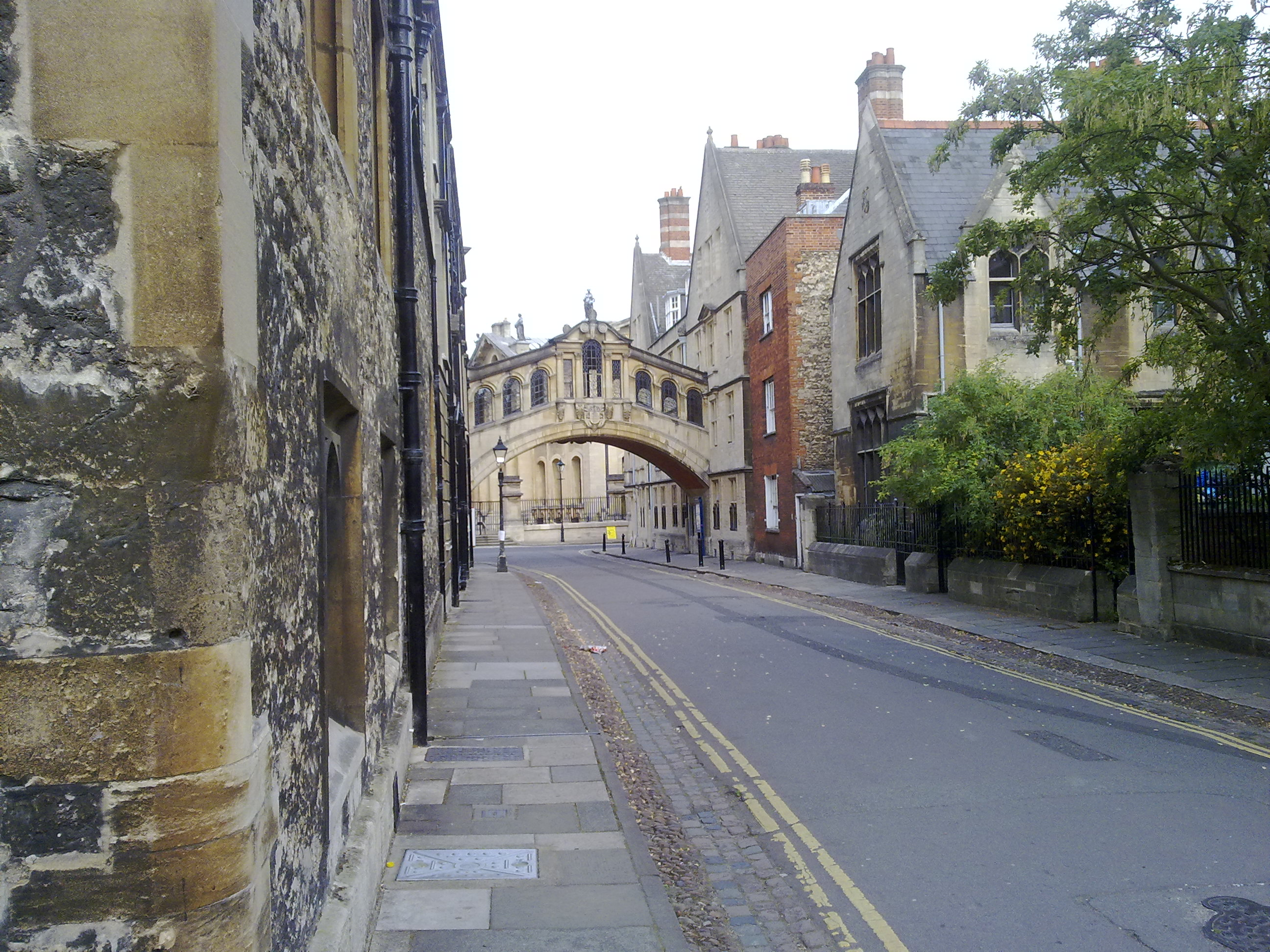
From within the NW end of New College Lane, looking back towards the Bridge of Sighs.

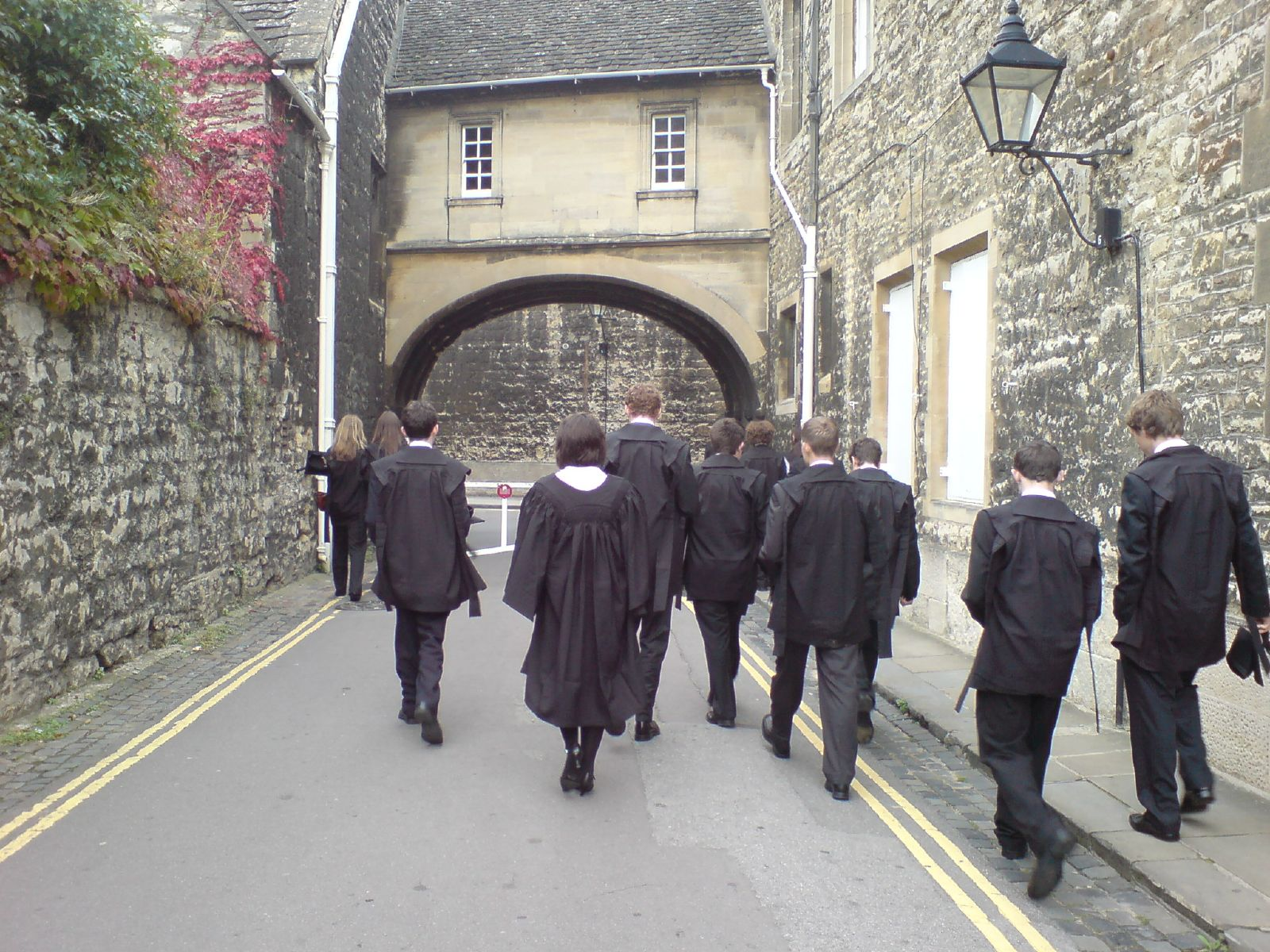
Eastern end of New College Lane near the entrance to New College, with Oxford University undergraduates in academic dress.

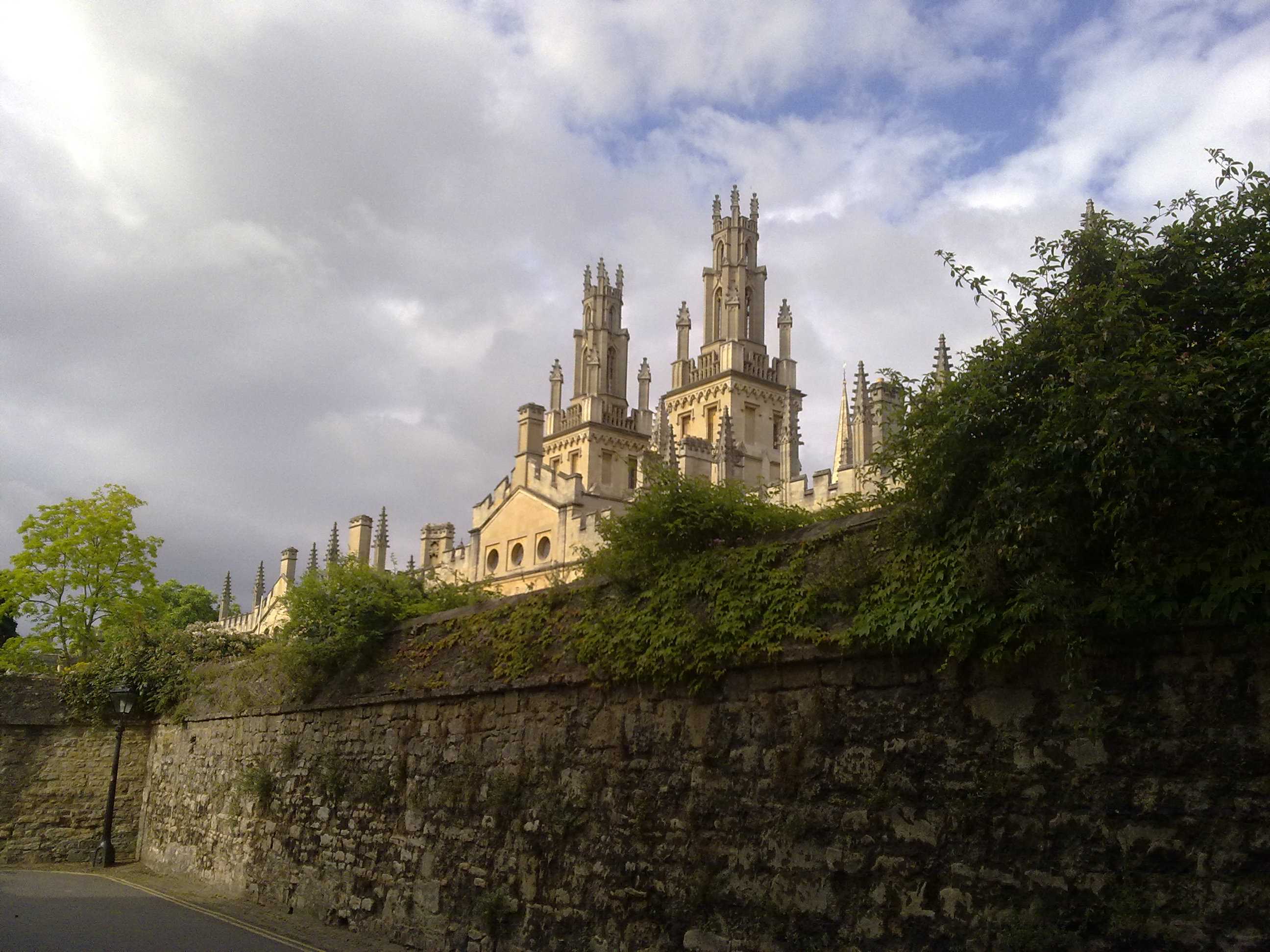
New College Lane, just past the entrance to New College, looking south west towards All Souls College.

New College Lane is a historic street in central Oxford, England, named after New College, one of the older Oxford colleges, adjacent to the north.

In 2010, New College Lane was named Britain's fourth most picturesque street, as part of Google's Street View Awards.

== Description ==
At the northwestern end of New College Lane is a junction with Catte Street, with the Sheldonian Theatre opposite. The main feature is the Bridge of Sighs, a covered bridge connecting two parts of Hertford College, which was completed in 1914 and attracts many tourists for the view. Also to the north is a small alley leading past some of the historic Oxford city wall to the Turf Tavern, a hidden but favourite public house for students and tourists.

The lane has three bends as it winds its way between the surrounding colleges. There is a rear entrance to New College. The lane is largely surrounded by high stone walls, with few windows. Some good examples of gargoyles can be seen, a feature of Oxford college architecture.

At its southeastern end, the lane continues as Queen's Lane, named after Queen's College to the south and west. There is a gate in the road at this point to prevent through traffic.

== Historic Markers ==
A plaque on a terraced house on the north side of the lane records that it was occupied by Edmond Halley, after whom Halley's Comet is named.

== Residents ==
Past and present residents of the lane include:

- Emily Benn - Labour Parliamentary candidate.
- Edmond Halley - English Astronomer Royal known for computing the orbit of Halley's Comet.

== Local Legends ==
Local legend claims that, during the English Civil War, Prince Rupert gathered volunteers here for an unsuccessful mounted raid on a Parliamentarian pay train. The reports of the sound of clattering hooves and men in armour here have been linked to this legend via Stone Tape theory. A phantom horse and carriage was reported here by Isis on 5 June 1968.
