= Peers School =

Peers School may refer to:

- Gakushūin, historically known as the Peers' School, a Japanese educational institution in Tokyo
- Oxford Academy, Oxfordshire, formerly Peers School, a secondary school in Oxford, England
