= Jacob Klein =

- Jacob Theodor Klein (1685–1759), Royal Prussian jurist, historian, botanist, mathematician and diplomat
- Jacob Herman Klein (German Wiki) (1688-1748), Dutch composer
- Jacob Klein (philosopher) (1899–1978), German-American philosopher and interpreter of Plato
- Jacob Klein (Assyriologist) (born 1934), Professor Emeritus of Assyriology and the Bible at Bar-Ilan University; member of Israel Academy of Sciences and Humanities
- Jacob Klein (chemist) (born 1949), soft condensed matter, polymer and surface scientist
