= Keble Road =

Road in central Oxford, England

Coordinates: 51.7594°N 1.2588°W

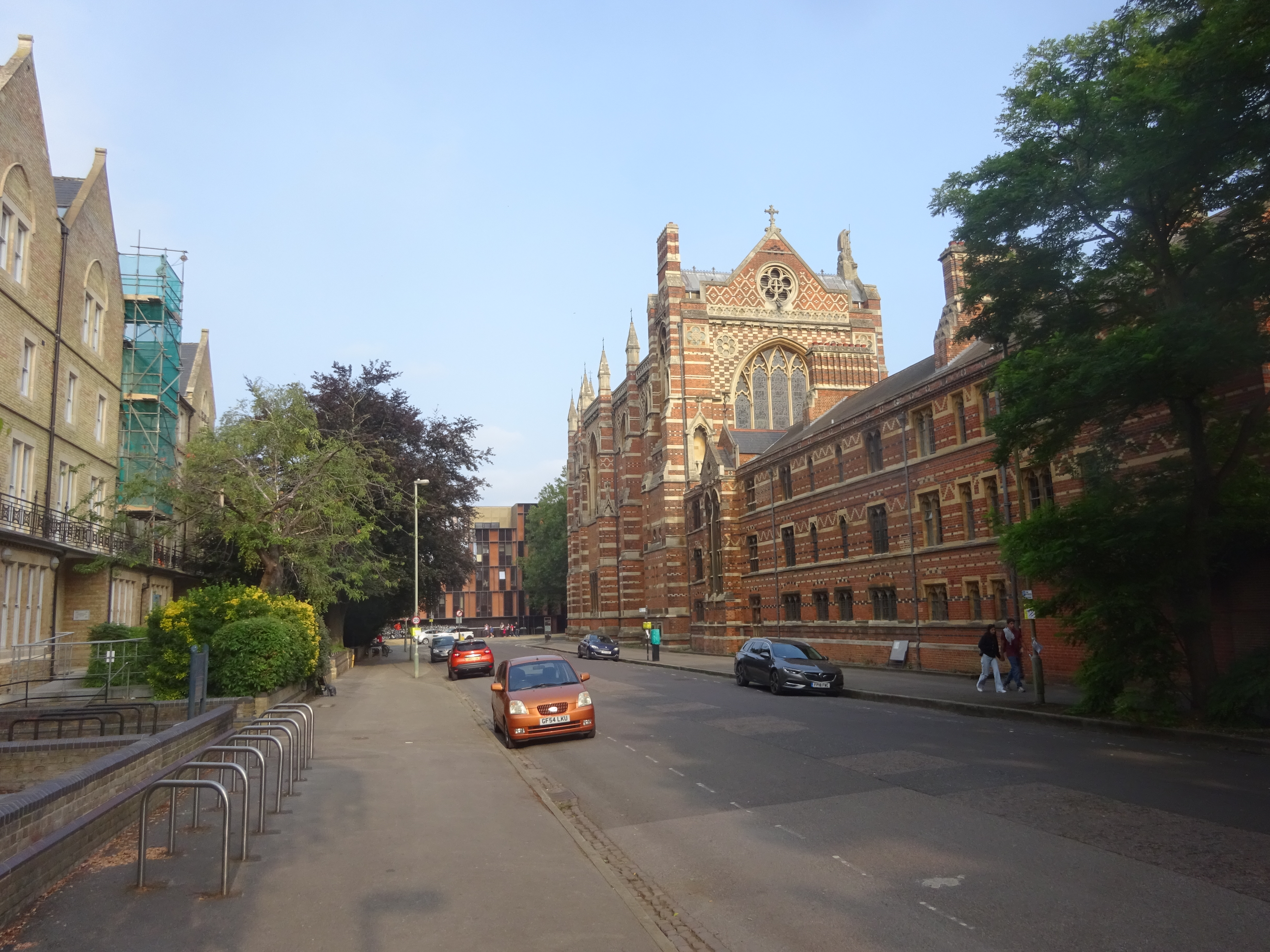
Looking east along Keble Road

Location of Keble Road within central Oxford

Keble Road is a short road running east–west in central Oxford, England. To the west is the southern end of the Banbury Road with St Giles' Church opposite. To the east is Parks Road with the University Parks opposite. Blackhall Road leads off the road to the south near the western end.

On the south side for much of its length is the Victorian brick Keble College, and in particular, its large chapel on the corner with Parks Road. Opposite this to the north is a row of Victorian terrace houses owned by the University of Oxford. The houses nearest Parks Road (numbers 6–11) were converted into the Oxford University Computing Laboratory (OUCL), now the Department of Computer Science, with its newer Wolfson Building added behind in 1993, and the Oxford e-Science Building in 2006 (both in Parks Road).

Oxford University's 1960s Denys Wilkinson Building (Particle physics, John Adams Institute and astrophysics) is in Keble Road, on the corner with Banbury Road. The Department of Theoretical Physics is at 1 Keble Road. The Oxford e-Research Centre (OeRC) is at 7 Keble Road.

The area to the north of Keble Road, bounded by Banbury Road and Parks Road, is known as the Keble Road Triangle and forms part of Oxford University's Science Area, with a number of its science department buildings located here.

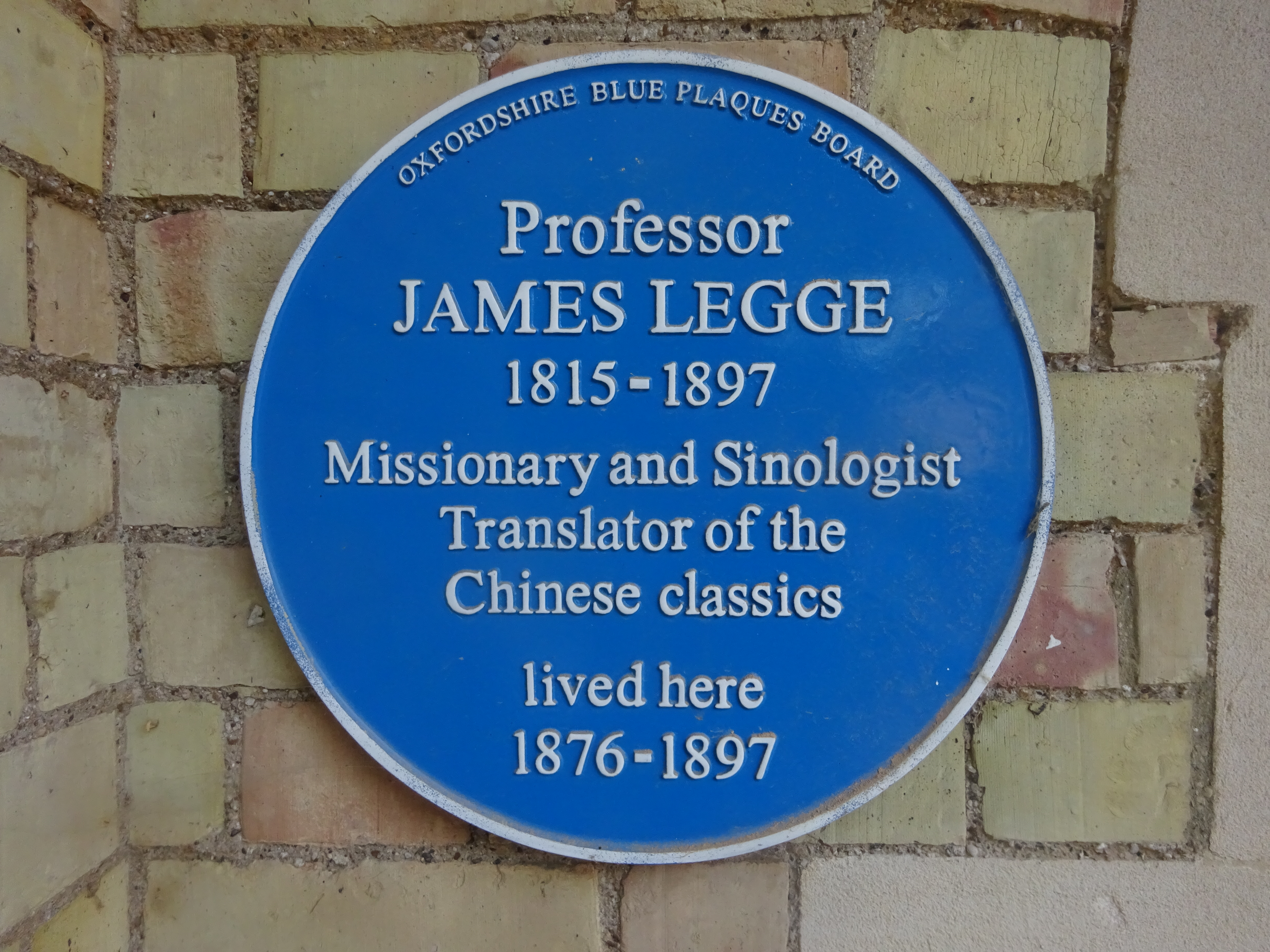
James Legge blue plaque

A blue plaque commemorating James Legge (1815–1897), Sinologist and translator, first Professor of Chinese at Oxford, was unveiled at 3 Keble Road, on 16 May 2018. William Archibald Spooner (1844–1930), Warden of New College and famed for "Spoonerisms", lived at 11 Keble Road, now part of the Department of Computer Science at Oxford, and an Oxfordshire Blue Plaque commemorating him was unveiled on 19 October 2024.

== Gallery ==
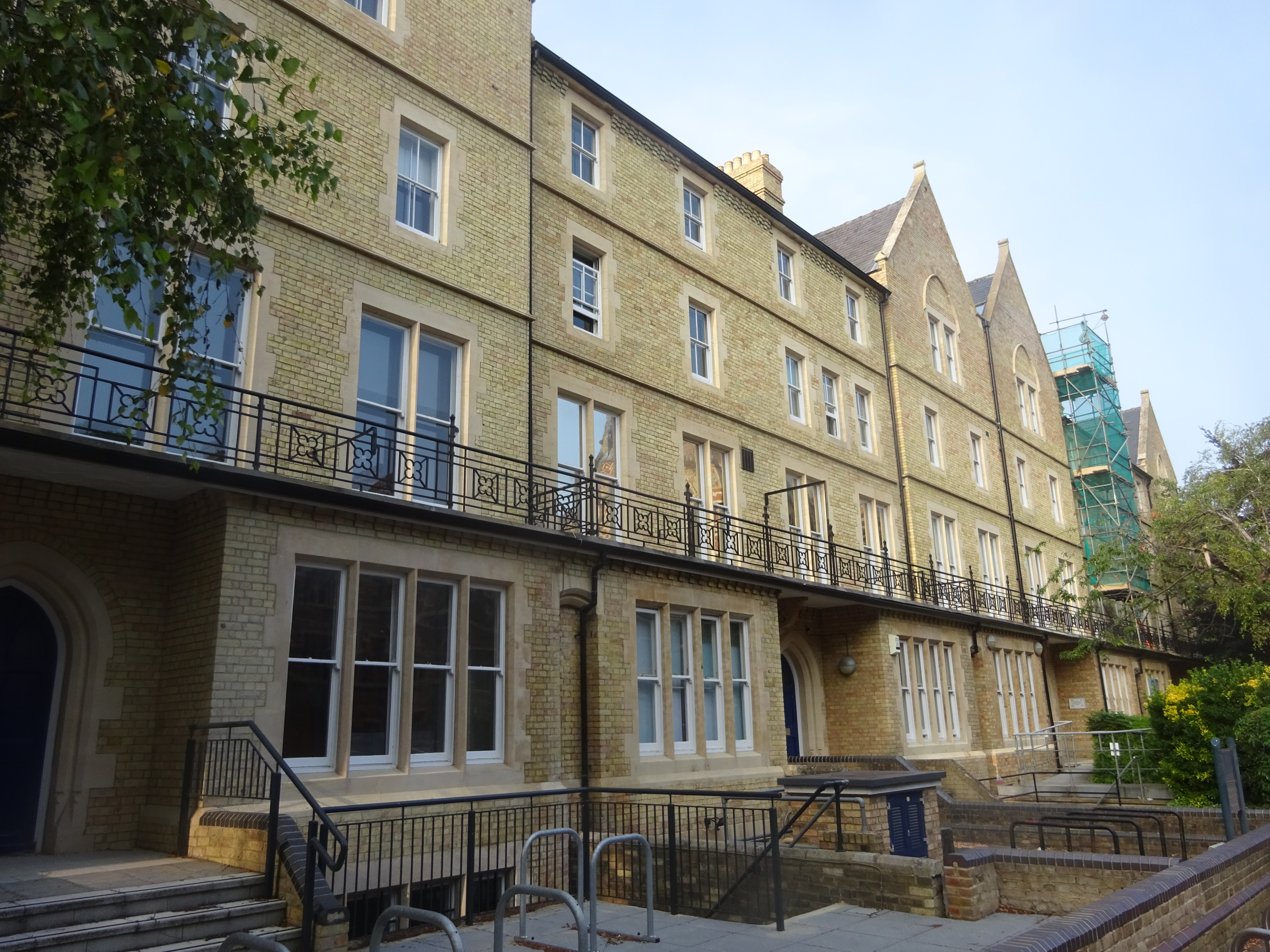
Department of Computer Science, University of Oxford, on the north side of Keble Road

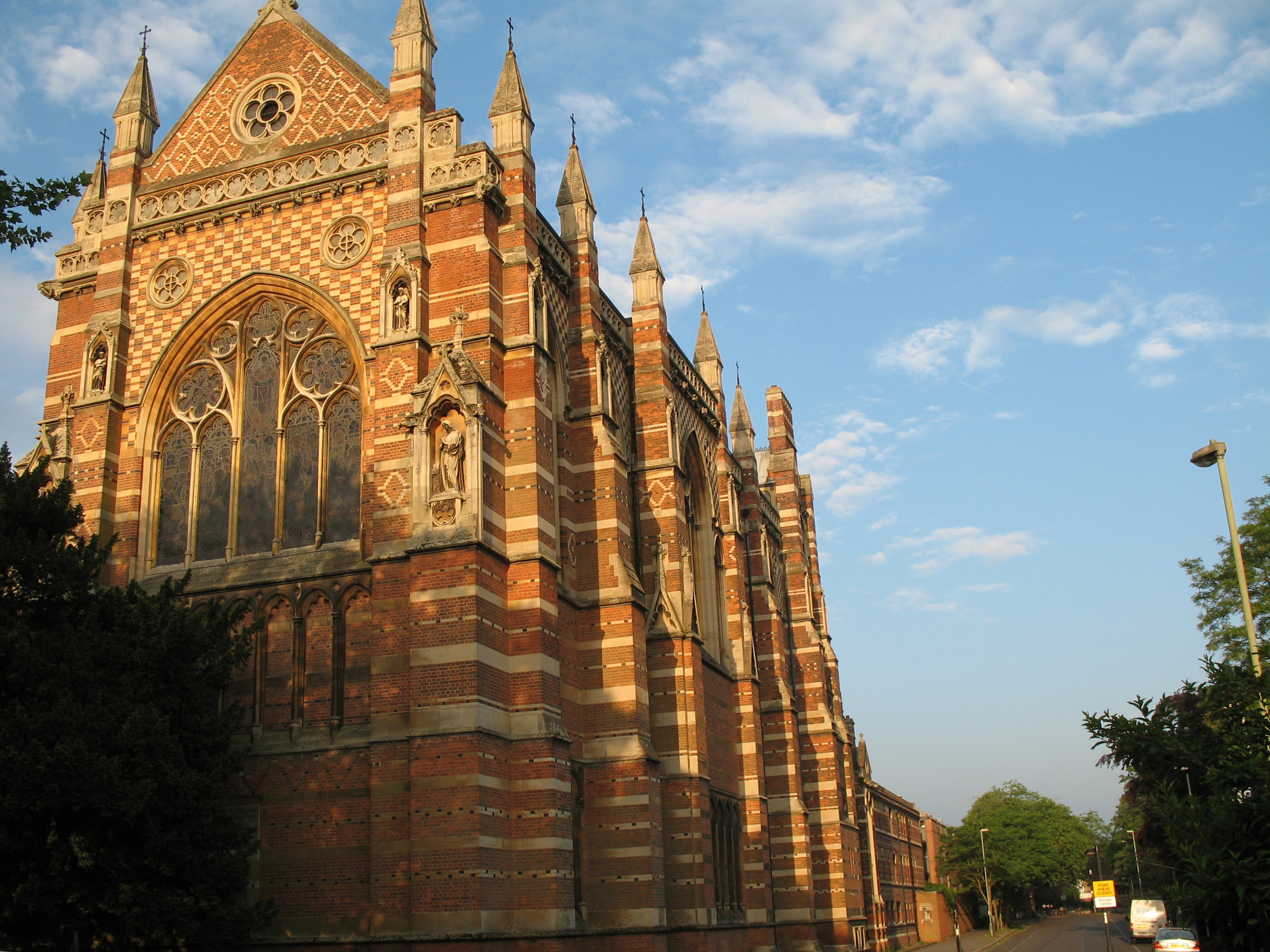
Keble College Chapel on the south side of Keble Road, viewed from Parks Road

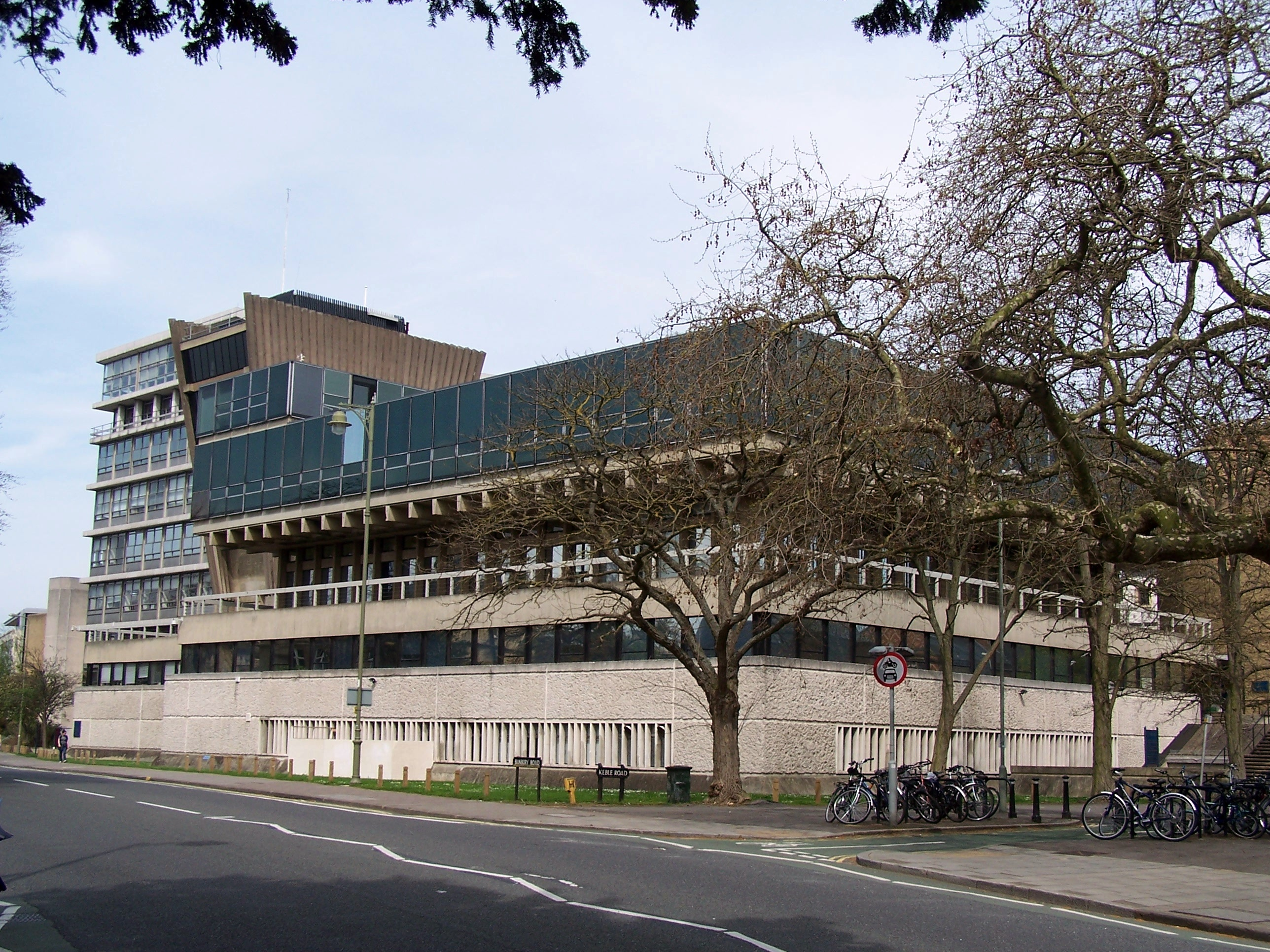
The Denys Wilkinson Building on the corner of the western end of Keble Road at the junction with Banbury Road
