= Clarendon Laboratory =

Laboratory of Oxford University

Coordinates: 51.75997°N 1.2565°W

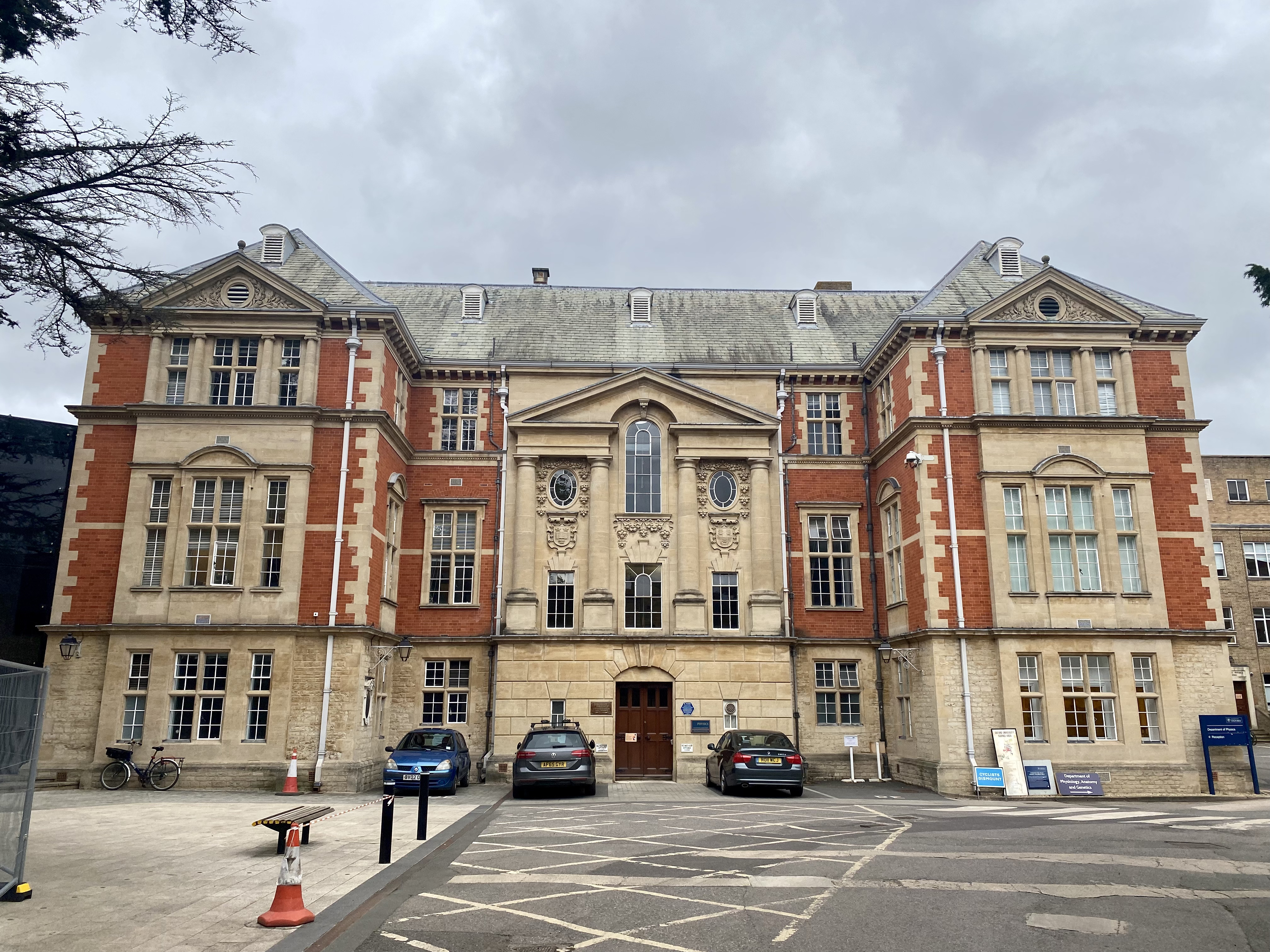
The Clarendon Laboratory – the main Townsend Building front facade

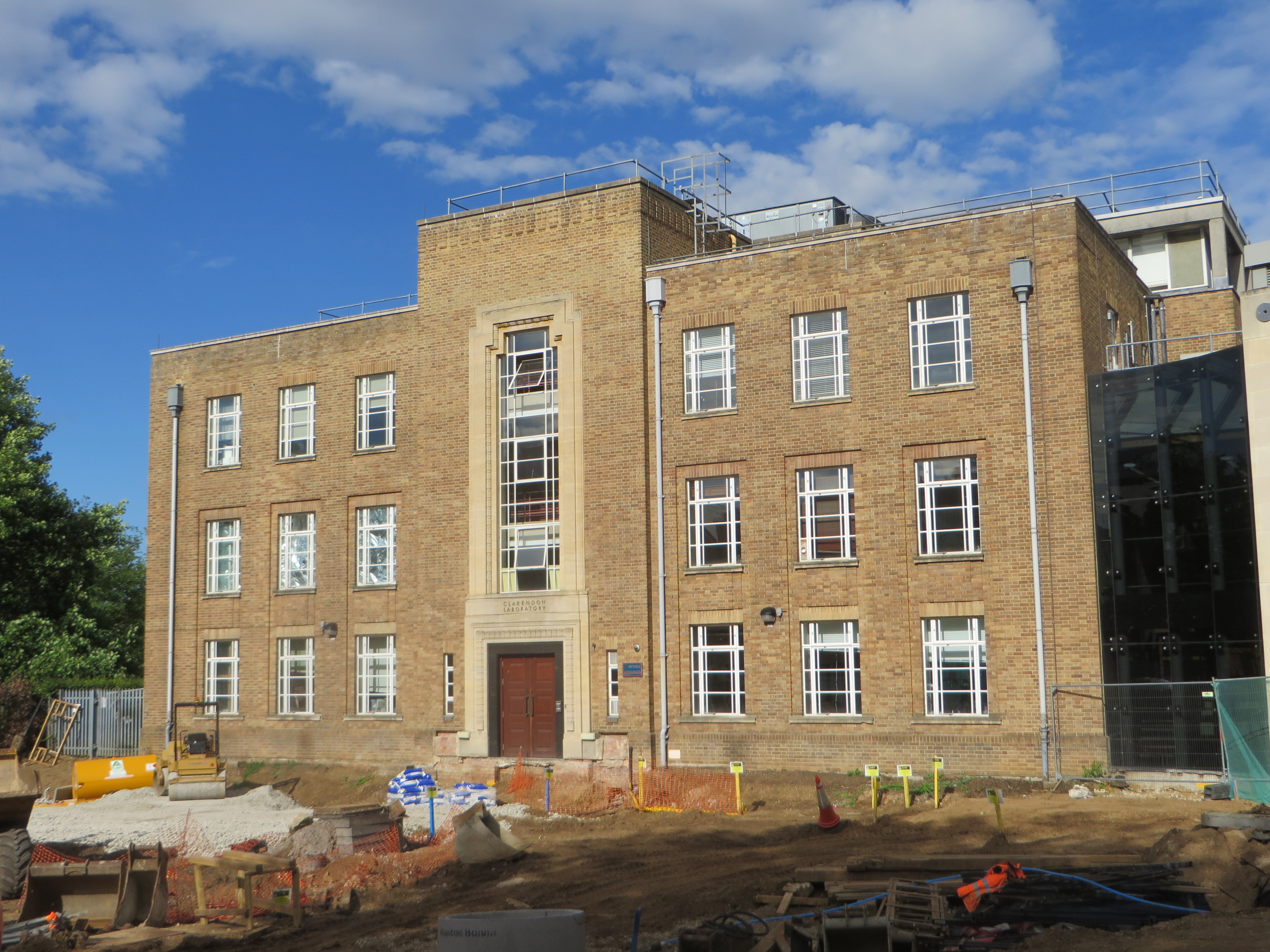
The Clarendon Laboratory – the Lindemann Building with the construction site of the new Beecroft Building (completed 2018) in front.

The Clarendon Laboratory, located on Parks Road within the Science Area in Oxford, England (not to be confused with the Clarendon Building, also in Oxford), is part of the Department of Physics at Oxford University. It houses the atomic and laser physics, condensed matter physics, and biophysics groups within the Department, although four other Oxford Physics groups are not based in the Clarendon Lab. The Oxford Centre for Quantum Computation is also housed in the laboratory.

== Buildings ==
The Clarendon Laboratory consists of two adjoining buildings, the Lindemann Building (named after Frederick Lindemann, 1st Viscount Cherwell) and the Grade II listed Townsend Building (named after Sir John Sealy Townsend).

The Beecroft Building (named after Adrian Beecroft) is now immediately in front of the Lindemann Building, completed in 2018 and designed by Hawkins\Brown, with a budget of approximately £40 million.

== History ==
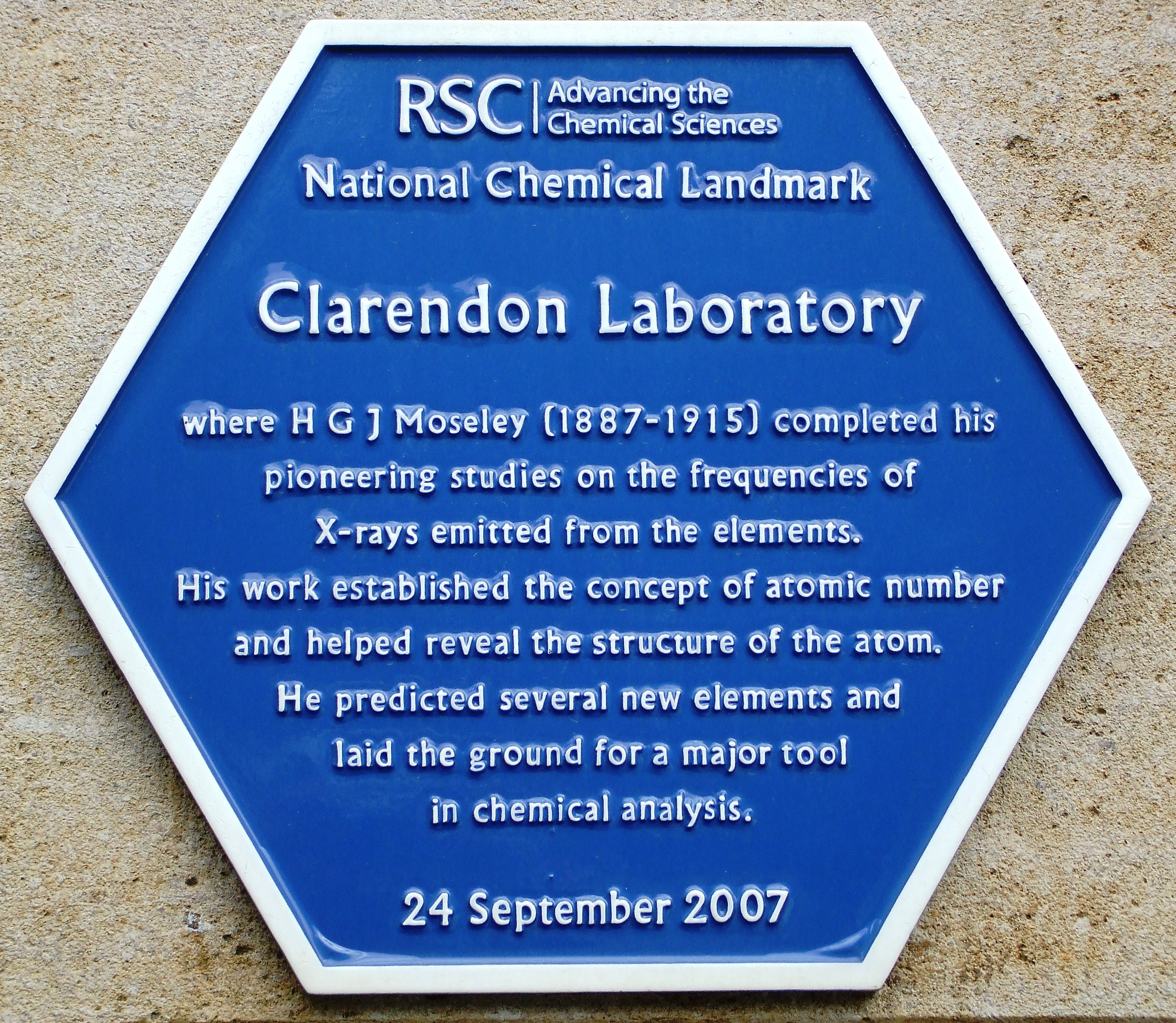
Blue plaque erected by the Royal Society of Chemistry on the Townsend Building of the Clarendon Laboratory in 2007, commemorating Henry Moseley's early 20th-century research work on X-rays emitted by elements.

The Clarendon is named after Edward Hyde, 1st Earl of Clarendon, whose trustees paid £10,000 for the building of the original laboratory, completed in 1872, making it the oldest purpose-built physics laboratory in England. The building was designed by Robert Bellamy Clifton.

The brothers Fritz and Heinz London developed the London equations when working there in 1935.

In 2007, the laboratory was granted chemical landmark status. The award was bestowed due to the work carried out by Henry Gwyn Jeffreys Moseley in 1914.

== Current use ==
The original building, substantially enlarged, is now part of the Oxford Earth Sciences Department. The Oxford Electric Bell apparatus (also known as the Clarendon Dry Pile), constructed in 1840, is located in the foyer of the Clarendon Laboratory.

== See also ==
- Department of Physics, University of Oxford
- Denys Wilkinson Building, a 1967 Department of Physics building
- Beecroft Building, a 2018 Department of Physics building
