= Denys Wilkinson =

British nuclear physicist (1922–2016)

- Born: Denys Haigh Wilkinson; 5 September 1922; Leeds, England
- Died: 22 April 2016 (aged 93)
- Education: Jesus College, Cambridge
- Scientific career
- Fields: Nuclear physics
- Doctoral students: Samar Mubarakmand

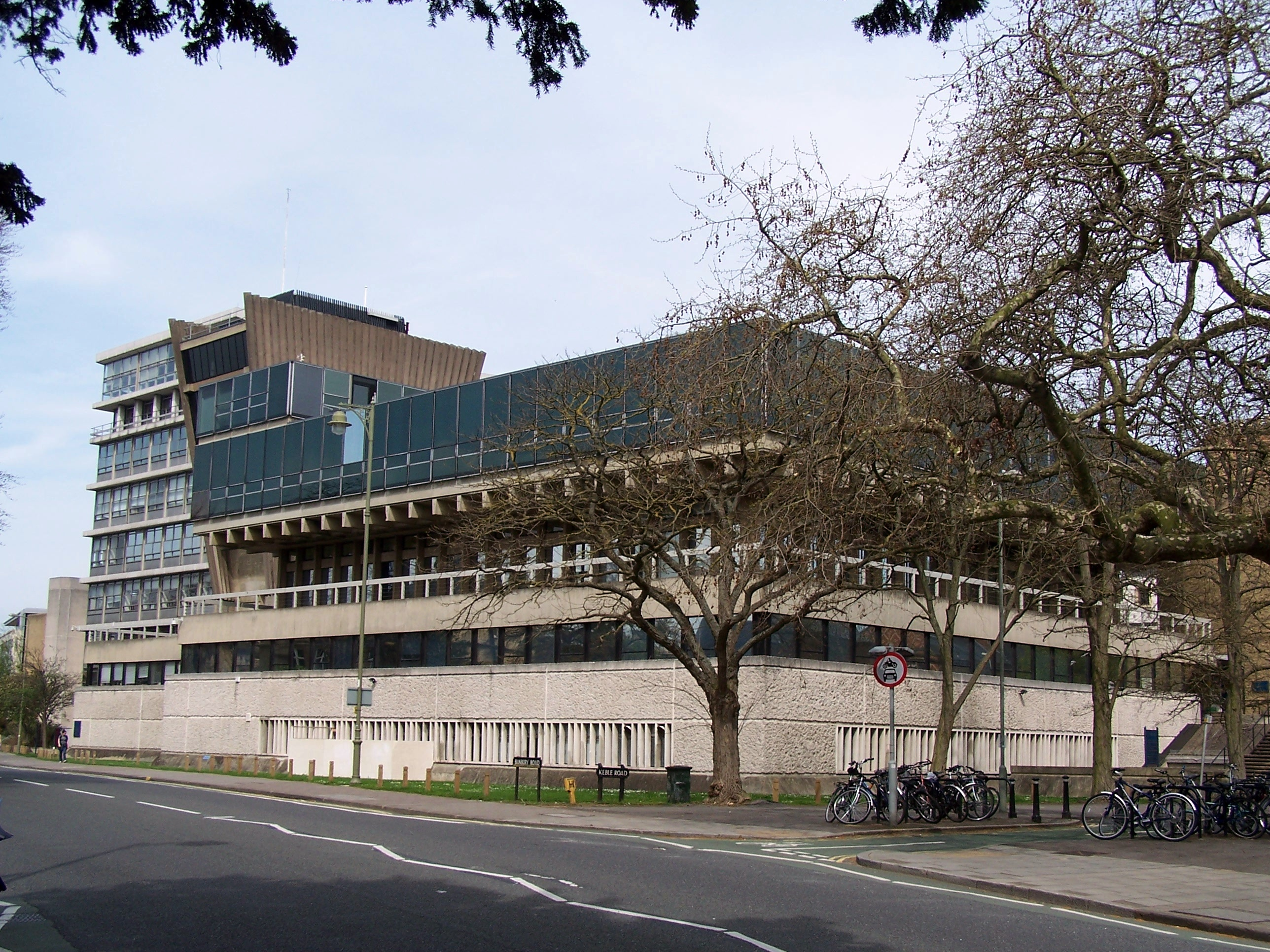
The Denys Wilkinson Building, part of the Department of Physics at Oxford University.

Sir Denys Haigh Wilkinson FRS (5 September 1922 – 22 April 2016) was a British nuclear physicist.

== Life ==
Wilkinson was born on 5 September 1922 in Leeds, Yorkshire and educated at Loughborough Grammar School and Jesus College, Cambridge, graduating in 1943.

After wartime work on the British and Canadian Atomic Energy projects, he returned to Cambridge in 1946, where he was awarded a PhD in 1947 and held posts culminating as Reader in Nuclear Physics from 1956–1957. From 1944 to 1959, he was a fellow of Jesus College, Cambridge.

He was made a Fellow of the Royal Society in 1956.

In 1957 he went to the University of Oxford as Professor of Nuclear Physics, and won the Fernand Holweck Medal and Prize the same year. In 1959 he became Professor of Experimental Physics at Oxford, and from 1962 to 1976 was head of the Department of Nuclear Physics. While he held his professorship at Oxford, he was a Fellow (there called a Student) of Christ Church, Oxford. He was knighted in 1974. In 2001 the Nuclear Physics Laboratory at the University of Oxford, which he had helped to create, was renamed the Denys Wilkinson Building in his honour.

Wilkinson served as chairman for both the Physics III Committee and the Electronic Experiments Committee at CERN.

On leaving Oxford, he served as vice-chancellor of the University of Sussex from 1976 to 1987. After his retirement, he was appointed emeritus professor of physics at Sussex in 1987.

Wilkinson's work in nuclear physics included investigation of the properties of nuclei with low numbers of nucleons. He was amongst the first to experimentally test rules relating to isospin. He also applied concepts from physics to the study of bird navigation.

He is also notable for the invention of the Wilkinson analog-to-digital converter, to support his experimental work.

He died on 22 April 2016 at the age of 93.

His papers are held at the Churchill Archives Centre in Cambridge. He was an Honorary Fellow of Jesus College, Cambridge from 1961, and an Honorary Student of Christ Church, Oxford from 1979. He won the Hughes Medal of the Royal Society in 1965 and the Royal Medal in 1980. In 1980 he received an honorary doctorate from the Faculty of Mathematics and Science at Uppsala University, Sweden.
