= John Wheater =

British particle physicist (born 1958)

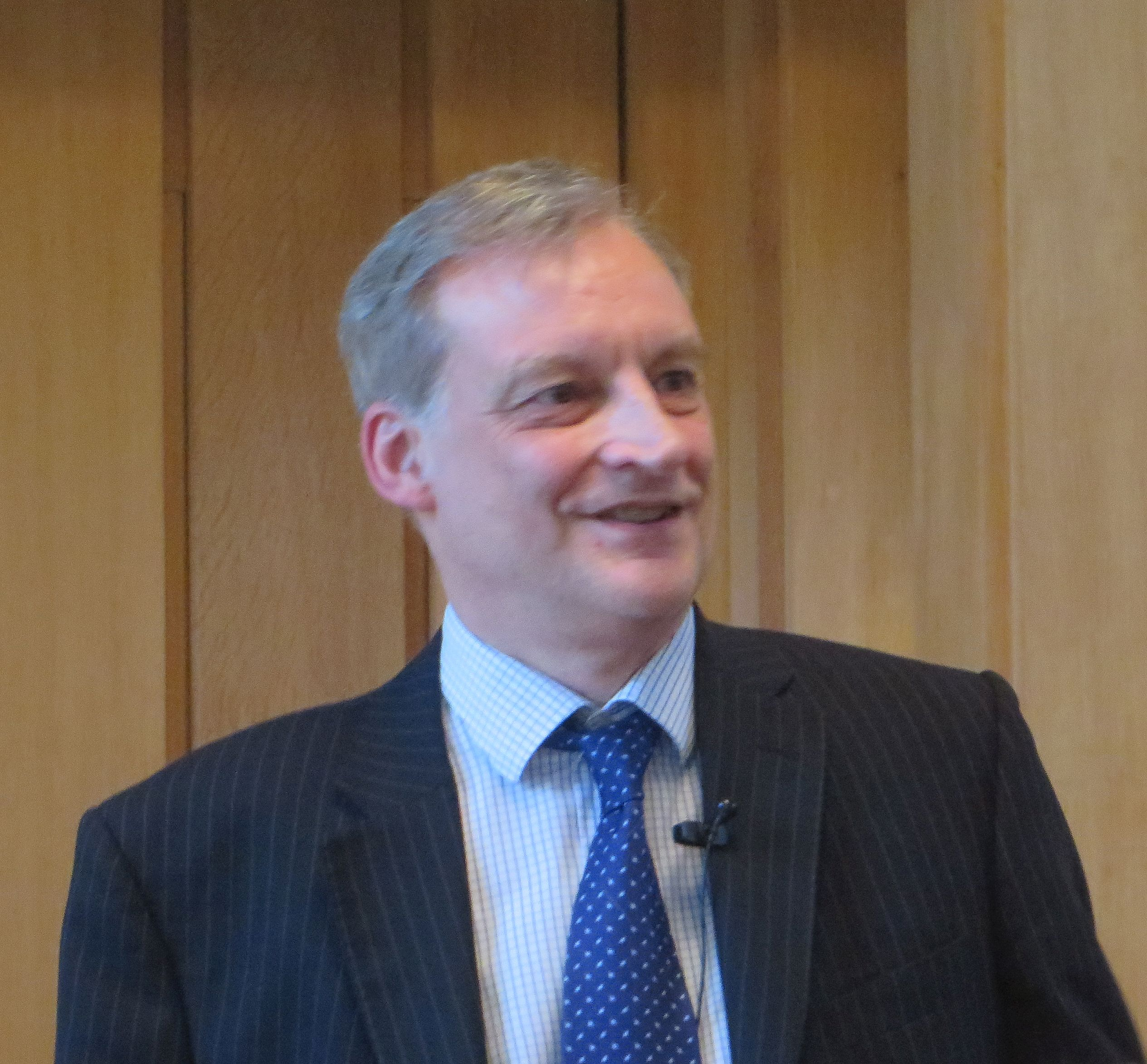
- Wheater speaking at St Cross College, Oxford, 25 February 2017
- Born: John Feather Wheater; 1958 (age 67–68); London, England
- Education: University of Oxford (BA, DPhil)
- Awards: Maxwell Medal and Prize (1993)
- Scientific career
- Fields: Physics; Theoretical physics Particle physics
- Workplaces: Durham University; University of Oxford
- Thesis: The Determination of the Electroweak Mixing Angle from Experiments (1981)
- Doctoral advisor: Christopher Llewellyn Smith
- Doctoral students: Simon Catterall; Neil Ferguson
- Website: www2.physics.ox.ac.uk/contacts/people/wheater

John Feather Wheater (born 1958, in London) is a British physicist. He is a professor at the University of Oxford, specializing in particle physics.

== Education ==
Wheater was educated at St Paul's School, London and the University of Oxford, where he read Physics at Christ Church from 1976 to 1979, graduating with a first class degree and winning the Scott Prize for Physics. He undertook a DPhil degree on electroweak radiative corrections, supervised by Chris Llewellyn Smith, from 1979 to 1981.

== Career and research ==
Wheater was a Junior Research Fellow in theoretical physics at Christ Church during 1981–84. In 1984–85, he was a lecturer in theoretical particle physics at Durham University.

In 1985, Wheater joined the academic staff of the Department of Physics at Oxford University, initially as a lecturer. He was also a fellow of University College, Oxford, from 1985 until 2015. During 1990 and later in 2003–4, he was on sabbatical leave spent at the Niels Bohr Institute in Copenhagen, Denmark. In 1993, he was awarded the Maxwell Medal and Prize by the Institute of Physics. He was Head of the Physics Department between 2010 and 2018. In 2015, he was appointed as Professor of Physics. Wheater leads the Particle Theory Group.

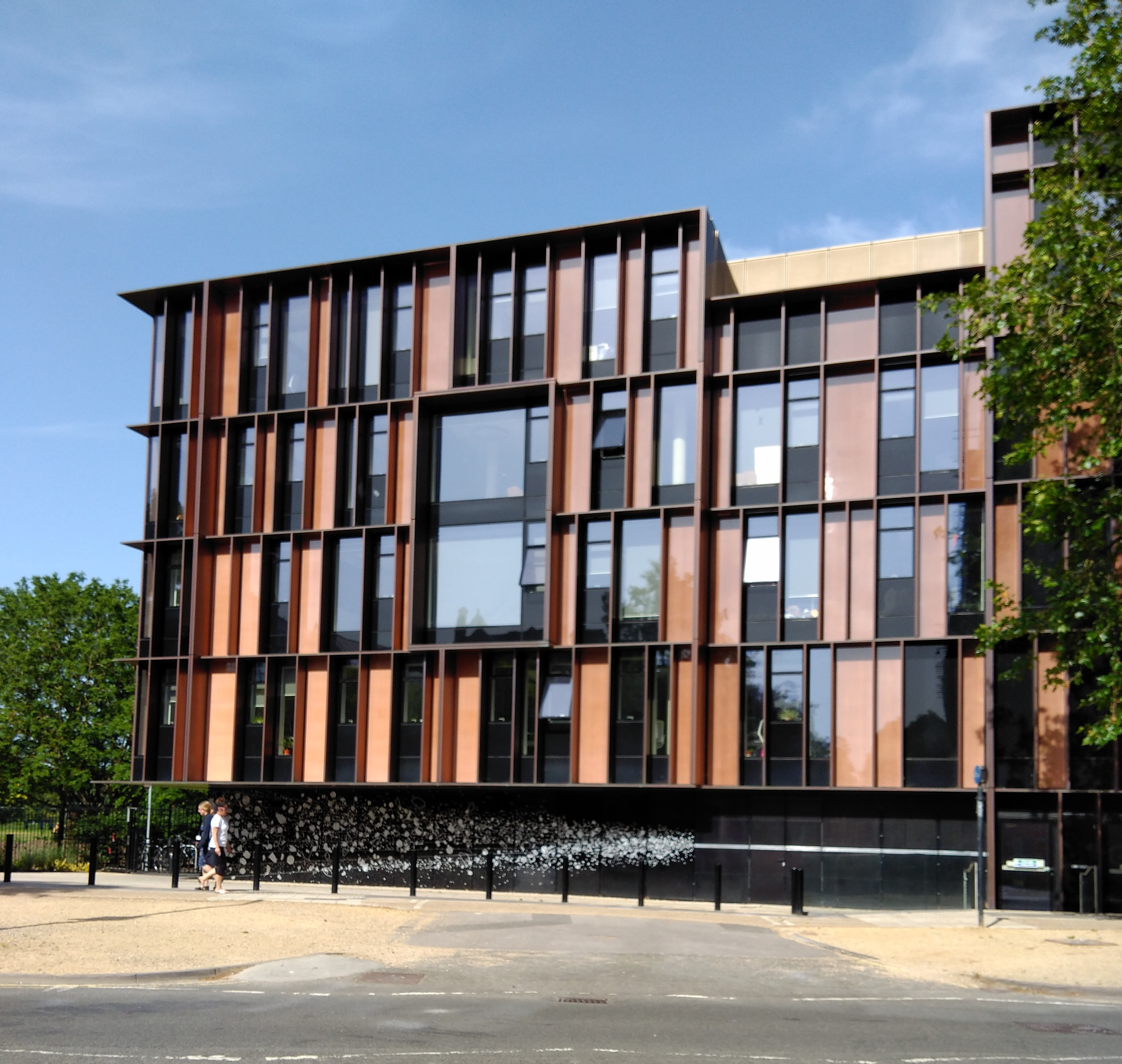
The Beecroft Building, part of the Department of Physics, opened in 2018 under Wheater's leadership

During Wheater's term as Head of the Department of Physics, the new Beecroft Building in the department was initiated. It was opened in 2018 by Sir Tim Berners-Lee (who formerly studied physics at Oxford), in the presence of Wheater as Head of department, Professor Louise Richardson (Vice-Chancellor of Oxford), Chris Patten (Chancellor of Oxford), and Adrian Beecroft (part-funder of the building).

In 2018–19, Wheater was invited to be a visiting professor at the QMATH-center in the Department of Mathematical Sciences at the University of Copenhagen, Denmark.

Wheater's former doctoral students include Neil Ferguson, who initially studied physics at Oxford University, but later became an epidemiologist and professor of mathematical biology at Imperial College London and was an influential scientist in the UK government strategy for the COVID-19 pandemic in the United Kingdom.

=== Selected publications ===
Wheater publications include:

- Low-energy predictions from grand unified theories
- C.H.L. Smith, J.F. Wheater, Electroweak radiative corrections and the value of sin2θW. Physics Letters B, 1981.
- J.F. Wheater, C.H.L. Smith, Electroweak radiative corrections to neutrino and electron scattering and the value of sin2θW. Nuclear Physics B, 1982.
- I.I. Kogan, N.E. Mavromatos, J.F. Wheater, D-brane recoil and logarithmic operators. Physics Letters B, 1996.
- P. Austing, J.F. Wheater, Convergent Yang-Mills matrix theories. Journal of High Energy Physics, 2001.

== Personal life ==
Wheater is married with two daughters.
