= Beecroft Building =

University of Oxford physics laboratory

Coordinates: 51.7598151°N 1.2577957°W

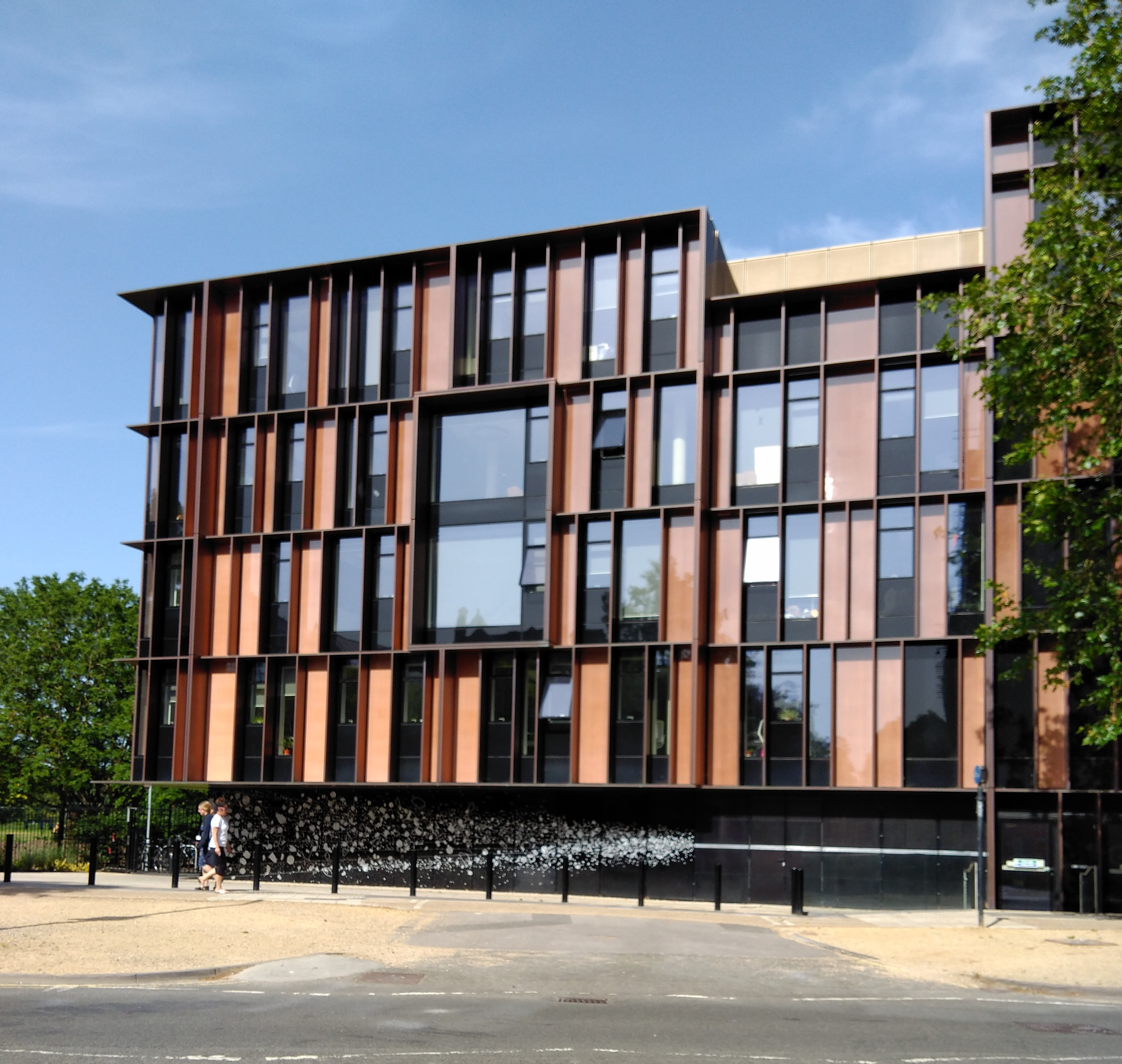
The Beecroft Building viewed from Parks Road, Oxford

The Beecroft Building is one of the buildings forming part of the Department of Physics, University of Oxford in Oxford, England.

The Beecroft Building is immediately in front of the Lindemann Building and close to the Clarendon Laboratory Townsend Building. It is located on Parks Road in the Science Area of Oxford University. It is next to the University Parks, immediately to the north.

The Beecroft Building was designed by Hawkins\Brown and completed in 2018. Planet Partitional was also involved with the contract. The budget was approximately £40 million.

The building was opened by Sir Tim Berners-Lee (who studied Physics as an undergraduate at Oxford) on 17 September 2018, in the presence of Professor Louise Richardson (Vice-Chancellor of Oxford), Chris Patten (Chancellor of Oxford), Professor John Wheater (Head of the Department of Physics) and Adrian Beecroft (part-funder of the building).

The building is named after its part-funder Adrian Beecroft. The building is specifically focused on theoretical, condensed matter and quantum physics. According to The Daily Telegraph, the funding for this building was inspired by Beecroft's interest in astrophysics.
