= Denys Wilkinson Building =

English research centre

Coordinates: 51.7596°N 1.2596°W

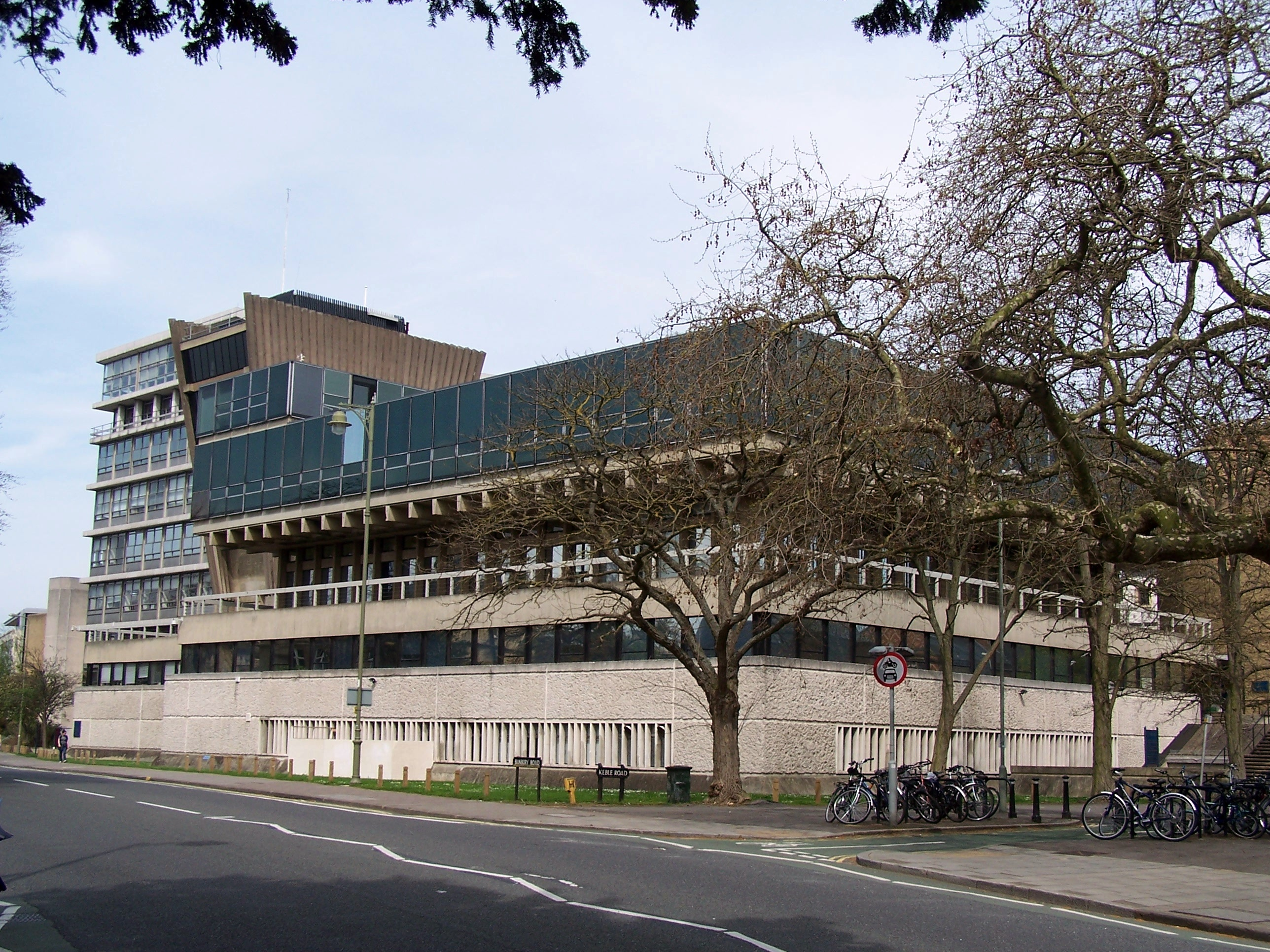
The Denys Wilkinson Building from the Banbury Road with the large Van de Graaff generator superstructure and Thom Building in the background.

Location of the Denys Wilkinson Building within central Oxford

The Denys Wilkinson Building is a prominent 1960s building in Oxford, England, designed by Philip Dowson at Arup in 1967.

== Overview ==
The building houses the astrophysics and particle physics sub-departments of the Department of Physics at Oxford University, plus the undergraduate teaching laboratories. It was originally built for the then Department of Nuclear Physics and named the Nuclear Physics Laboratory. From 1988, the building was known as the Nuclear and Astrophysics Laboratory (NAPL) after the (Sub-)Department of Astrophysics moved from the University Observatory in the Science Area. In 2001, the building was renamed as the Denys Wilkinson Building, in honour of the British nuclear physicist Sir Denys Wilkinson (1922–2016), who was involved in its original creation.

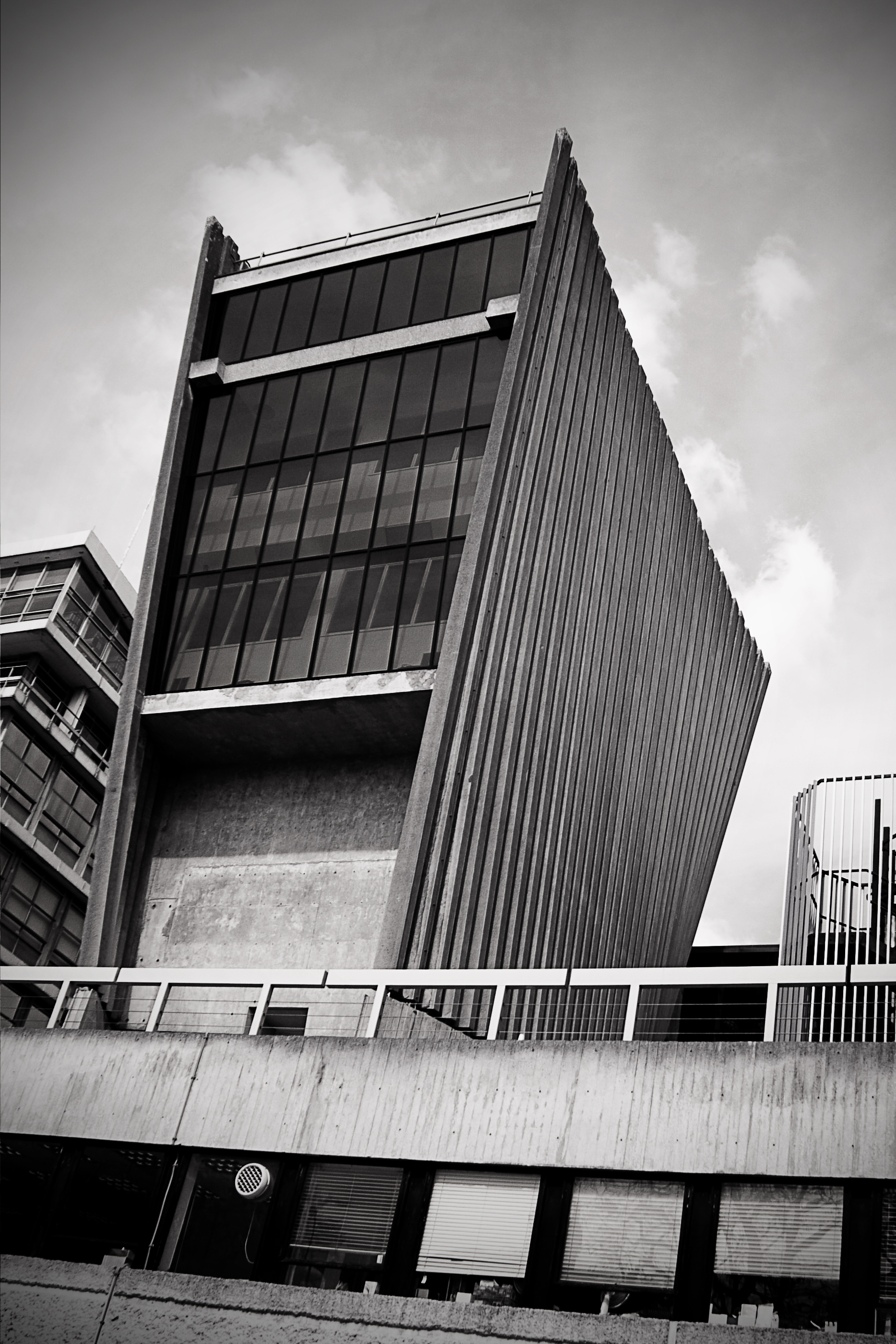
The fan-shaped superstructure built to house a Van de Graaff generator

The building is located on the corner of Banbury Road to the west and Keble Road to the south. To the north is the tall Thom Building of Oxford University's Department of Engineering Science, also built in the 1960s. It forms part of the Keble Road Triangle. Attached is a large and distinctive fan-shaped superstructure that was built to house a Van de Graaff generator. Nikolaus Pevsner commented that this marked "the arrival of the 'New Brutalism' in Oxford".

== Particle accelerators ==
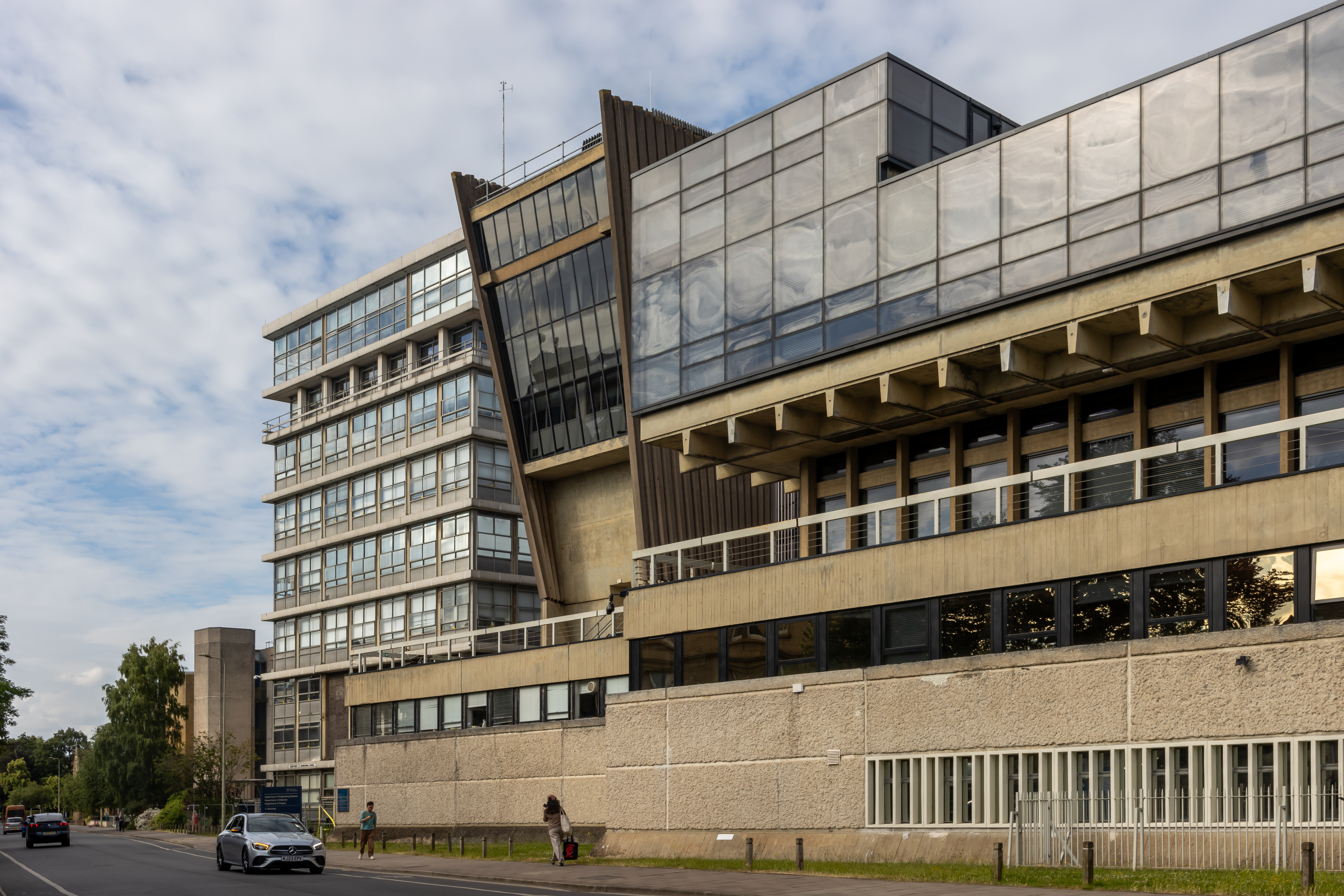
View from Banbury Road

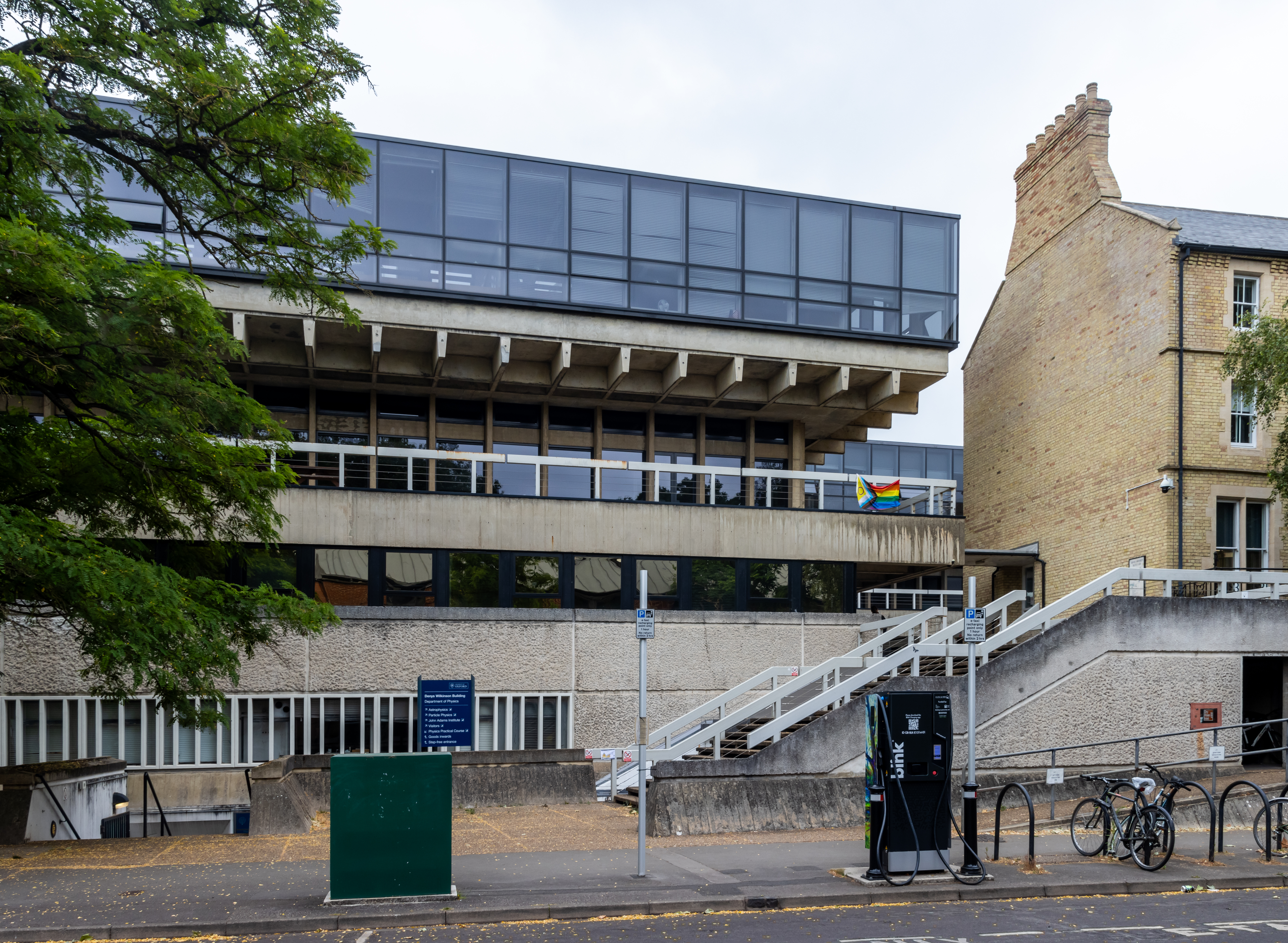
View from Keble Road

The building was originally built to host two small (by today's standards) particle accelerators.

=== Tandem accelerator ===
The first was a vertical folded tandem electrostatic accelerator (see Tandem accelerators, the top being at floor level in the fan-shaped superstructure, the bottom in the basements. Negatively charged ions were introduced at the bottom and would be accelerated towards the large charge (10 million volts) built up by the Van de Graaff generator by electrostatic attraction. At the top, the ions would pass through a thin foil to strip off electrons, and then their trajectory would be bent 180° by a large magnetic field. The now positively charged nuclei would then be electrostatically repelled by the same charge, accelerating them back down another vacuum tube. At the bottom the beam pipe exited, the beam was bent 90° by another magnet before entering a linear accelerator.

This particular accelerator consisted of a pressure vessel, about 40 feet tall, containing an annular lift/elevator platform to enable work to be carried out at different levels inside. Stacked in the centre was the accelerator column, comprising the Van de Graaff generator (a thick, rubber/canvas belt approximately 2 feet wide), the up/down vacuum tubes, and the electron stripper and magnet systems on top. The magnet was powered by a generator driven the by Van de Graaff belt. The column was surrounded by electrostatic discharge protection rings, in case of sparks. The whole column was resting on glass bricks at the bottom, with no lateral supports whatsoever.

The pressure vessel was filled with sulphur hexafluoride gas. The storage tank for this was located outside on the eastern side of the building. The gas served as an insulator, allowing higher voltages on the Van de Graaff generator to be run resulting in greater particle energies being attained than if air had been used. It also served as a fire suppressant, in the event of a spark discharge (which, when they did occur, was described as being "very loud indeed"). The sulphur hexafluoride was sourced from a company in Italy, and occasionally shipments of "bombola di gas" addressed to the "Nuclear Physics Department" Oxford would get stuck on the Italian/French border.

=== Linear RF accelerator ===
This was an RF resonant cavity accelerator and would add additional energy to the nuclei. It was located down in a basement. On exiting the accelerator the nuclei would drift to a target station for experiments. The particle energy at the target station was about 22MeV.

In the late 1980s, this accelerator was sold to Beijing University. To extract it holes had to be cut through the floor of the covered loading dock located at the north side of the building all the way down to the lowest basement.

=== Nuclear structure physics ===
The accelerators were intended to support research into nuclear structure, a field that was popular at the time of the building's construction. However, it was discovered that the field was extremely complex and progress was slow. The field was overtaken by other fields in nuclear physics, and the accelerators in the Denys Wilkinson Building fell into disuse.

== Building design ==
The building was designed around conducting particle physics. The bulk of the accelerator infrastructure and experimental target station is in basement levels. The walls of the building at the lower levels are very thick concrete and are laden with boron. This was to keep the natural background radiation count inside the building as low as possible, and not (as was the popular and local civic belief) to keep radiation in. Some of the more exposed parts of the building suffered from rebar corrosion.

The building was originally going to be further extended on the eastern side, but the funding never became available.

== Other uses ==
In the 1970s and 1980s, the building's basement was also designated as the emergency shelter for Oxford City Council. There was occasionally tension with the local council, which periodically tried to shut down the "Nuclear Physics Department" of the university. Generally, such tensions were resolved with arranged visits, and explanations as to the role it would also serve for the councillors in the event of a nuclear attack on the United Kingdom.

== John Adams Institute for Accelerator Science ==
The John Adams Institute for Accelerator Science (JAI), named for John Adams (physicist), is located in the building. The JAI was established in 2004 as a joint venture between the Departments of Physics at Oxford and Royal Holloway University of London, with Imperial College London joining the venture in 2011.

== See also ==
- Clarendon Laboratory
