= Dr Lee's Professorships =

The Dr Lee's Professorships are three named statutory professorships of the University of Oxford. They were created in 1919, and are named after Matthew Lee (1695–1755) who had endowed three readerships at Christ Church, Oxford, in the 19th century.

== Dr Lee's Professor of Anatomy ==
This professorship is linked with a fellowship at Hertford College, Oxford.

- Arthur Thomson (1919–?); first incumbent
- Sir Wilfrid Le Gros Clark (1934–1962)
- Ray Guillery (1984–1996)
- Dame Kay Davies (1998–present)

== Dr Lee's Professor of Chemistry ==
This professorship is linked with a fellowship at Exeter College, Oxford.

- Frederick Soddy (1919–1936); first incumbent
- Sir Cyril Hinshelwood (1937–?)
- Sir Rex Richards (1964–1969)
- Frederick Dainton, Baron Dainton (1970–1973)
- Sir John Shipley Rowlinson (1974–1993)
- John Simons (1993–1999)
- Jacob Klein (2000–2008)
- Dame Carol Robinson (2009–present); first female chemistry professor at Oxford

== Dr Lee's Professor of Experimental Philosophy (Physics) ==
This professorship is linked with a fellowship at Wadham College, Oxford.

- Frederick Lindemann, 1st Viscount Cherwell (1919–1956); first incumbent
- Sir Francis Simon (1956); died one month after taking up the professorship
- Brebis Bleaney (1957–1977)
- Sir William Mitchell (1978–?)
- Roger Cowley (1988–2007)
- Paolo Radaelli (2008–present)
