= Beecroft Report =

The Beecroft Report was an independent report on employment law published in the United Kingdom that recommended making it easier to sack workers. Critics of the report written by Adrian Beecroft note his links to the "legal loan shark" Wonga.
