= Simon Catterall =

American physicist

- Born: 1964 (age 61–62)
- Education: University of Oxford (AB and D. Phil.)
- Scientific career
- Fields: Particle physics Lattice field theory Lattice gauge theory
- Workplaces: Syracuse University; University of Oxford
- Thesis: Numerical Studies of Field Theories on Random Lattices (1988)
- Doctoral advisor: John Wheater
- Website: smcatter.expressions.syr.edu

Simon Marcus Catterall (born 1964) is an American physicist at Syracuse University. His research involves High Energy Theory, particularly Lattice field theory.

He was elected Fellow of the American Physical Society in 2016 for For numerous important contributions to computational physics and Lattice field theory through studies of gravity, technicolor, and especially the lattice formulation of supersymmetric field theories.
