= Arthur Thomson (anatomist) =

British anatomist and anthropologist (1858–1935)

University of Oxford Anthropology Diploma class of 1910-11. Thomson is front and center

Arthur Thomson (21 March 1858, Edinburgh – 7 February 1935, Oxford) was a British anatomist and anthropologist. He is best remembered for his formulation of Thomson's Nose Rule, which states that ethnic groups originating in cold, arid climates tend to have longer and thinner noses, while those in warm, humid climates tend to have shorter and thicker noses. The underlying physiological explanation for Thomson's Rule is that noses help warm and humidify inhaled air; a longer and thinner nose increases the relative contact area between the air flow and the nasal cavity, and as such it becomes a highly selected trait in colder climates.

== Biography ==
Thomson was educated at Edinburgh University. In 1885 he was hired by Henry Acland to lecture on anatomy at the University of Oxford. Acland was determined to create a medical school at Oxford, but after he fell ill, Thomson had to bear much of the administrative burden. This would eventually prevent him from reaching his potential as a scholar. Once the diploma for anthropology was formed in 1905, Thomson would be one of three professors who would make up the Oxford anthropology department until he retired in 1933. From 1919 until his retirement, he was Dr Lee's Professor of Anatomy at Oxford (the first to hold that title) and also held a fellowship at Christ Church, Oxford. He was elected President of the Anatomical Society of Great Britain and Ireland for 1906 to 1908.

His main pastime was watercolour painting, and he exhibited work occasionally at the Royal Academy, where he was a professor of anatomy from 1900–34.

== Publications ==
- A Handbook of Anatomy for Art Students, Clarendon Press, 1896.
- The ancient races of the Thebaid: being an anthropometrical study of the inhabitants of Upper Egypt from the earliest prehistoric times to the Mohammedan conquest, based upon the examination of over 1,500 crania, Arthur Thomson and D. Randall-Maciver, Clarendon Press, 1905
- "Man's Nasal Index in Relation to Certain Climatic Conditions", Arthur Thomson and L. H. Dudley Buxton, in The Journal of the Royal Anthropological Institute of Great Britain and Ireland, vol. 53, 1923
- The Endowment of Research, essay
