= Paolo Radaelli =

Italian physicist and academic

Professor Paolo G. Radaelli FInstP
- Born: 11/10/1961; Milan, Italy
- Education: University of Milan, Illinois Institute of Technology
- Alma mater: University of Milan
- Scientific career
- Fields: Physics
- Workplaces: Department of Physics, University of Oxford; Wadham College, Oxford
- Doctoral advisor: Carlo Segre, Jim Jorgensen
- Other academic advisors: Pino Marchesini

Paolo Giuseppe Radaelli, FInstP (born 11 October 1961) is an Italian physicist and academic. He is the Dr Lee's Professor of Experimental Philosophy (Physics) at the University of Oxford and a Professorial Fellow of Wadham College, Oxford.

== Biography ==
Radaelli obtained a Laurea degree Summa cum Laude in 1986 from University of Milan (his thesis supervisor was Pino Marchesini). As part of the mandatory Italian National Service, he served for one year in the 28º Reggimento "Pavia" as a drill instructor, leaving with the rank of corporal major. Between 1988 and 1989, he worked as a research associate at the ITM institute of the National Research Council (Italy) in the field of High-temperature superconductivity. In 1989, he was awarded a travel scholarship by Pirelli Cavi e Sistemi and moved to the Illinois Institute of Technology (Chicago), where he later completed a PhD under the academic supervision of Carlo Segre, and worked in close collaboration with James D. Jorgensen and David Hinks at Argonne National Laboratory. After a post-doc in Jorgensen's group between 1992 and 1993, he moved to Grenoble, first as a post-doc with Massimo Marezio at the Laboratories de Cristallographie of the Centre national de la recherche scientifique, then as a scientist at the Institut Laue–Langevin. In 1998, he became an Instrument Scientists and later Crystallography Group Leader at the ISIS neutron source at the Rutherford Appleton Laboratory in Didcot, England. Since 2008, he has been the Dr Lee's Professor of Experimental Philosophy (Physics) at the University of Oxford, and he is also a Professorial Fellow of Wadham College, Oxford. In 2017, he was appointed a Knight of the Order of the Star of Italy.

== Selected works ==
- Paolo Radaelli (2011). Symmetry in Crystallography: Understanding the International Tables. Oxford: Oxford University Press. ISBN 978-0-19-955065-4.
