= Science Area, Oxford =

Area of Oxford, England

Coordinates: 51.759°N 1.254°W

Science Area
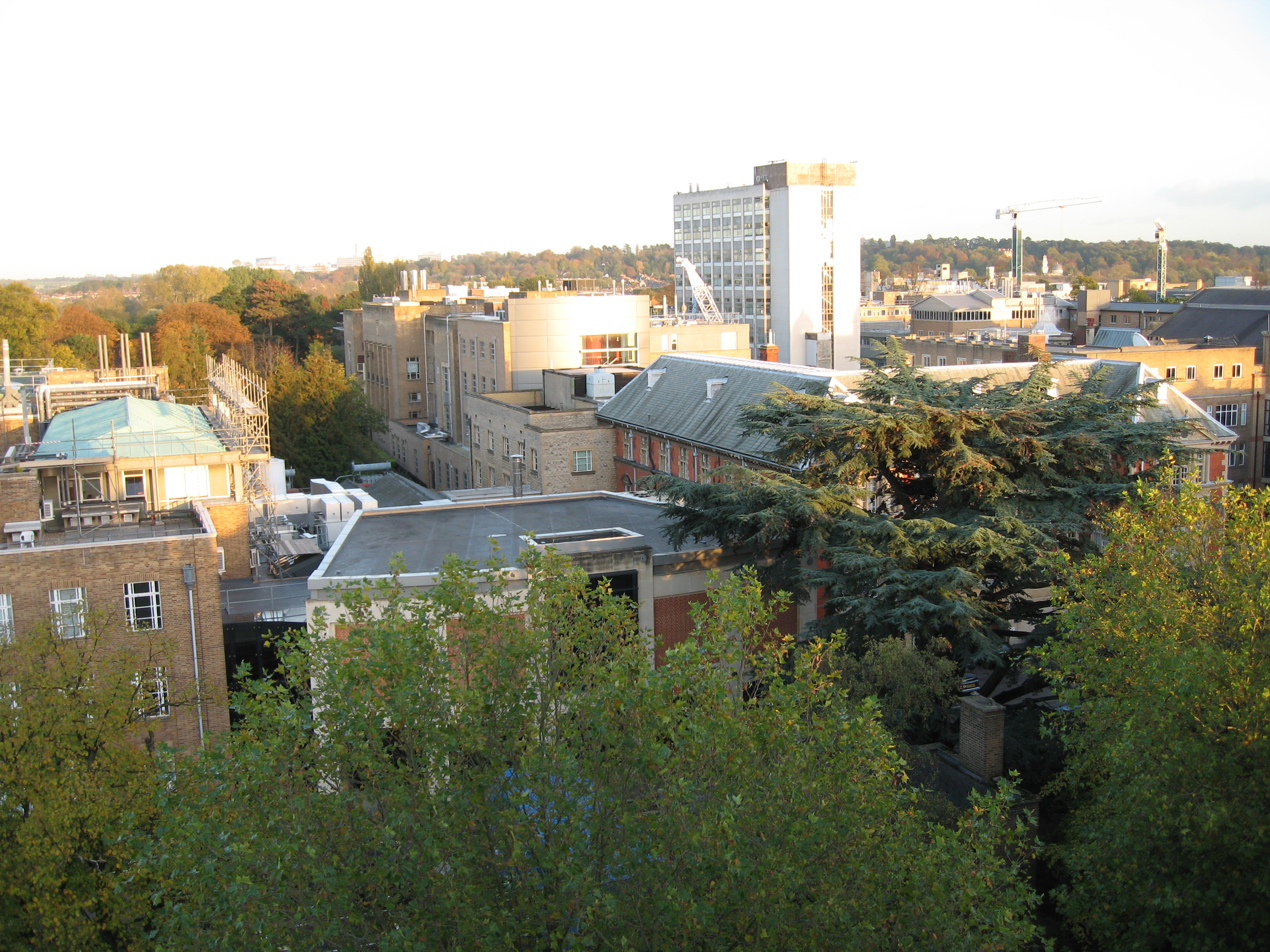
- Oxford Science Area

- Location within Oxfordshire
- OS grid reference: SP515069
- Civil parish: unparished
- District: Oxford
- Shire county: Oxfordshire
- Region: South East
- Country: England
- Sovereign state: United Kingdom
- Post town: Oxford
- Postcode district: OX2
- Dialling code: 01865
- Police: Thames Valley
- Fire: Oxfordshire
- Ambulance: South Central
- UK Parliament: Oxford West and Abingdon
- Website: Science Area, University of Oxford

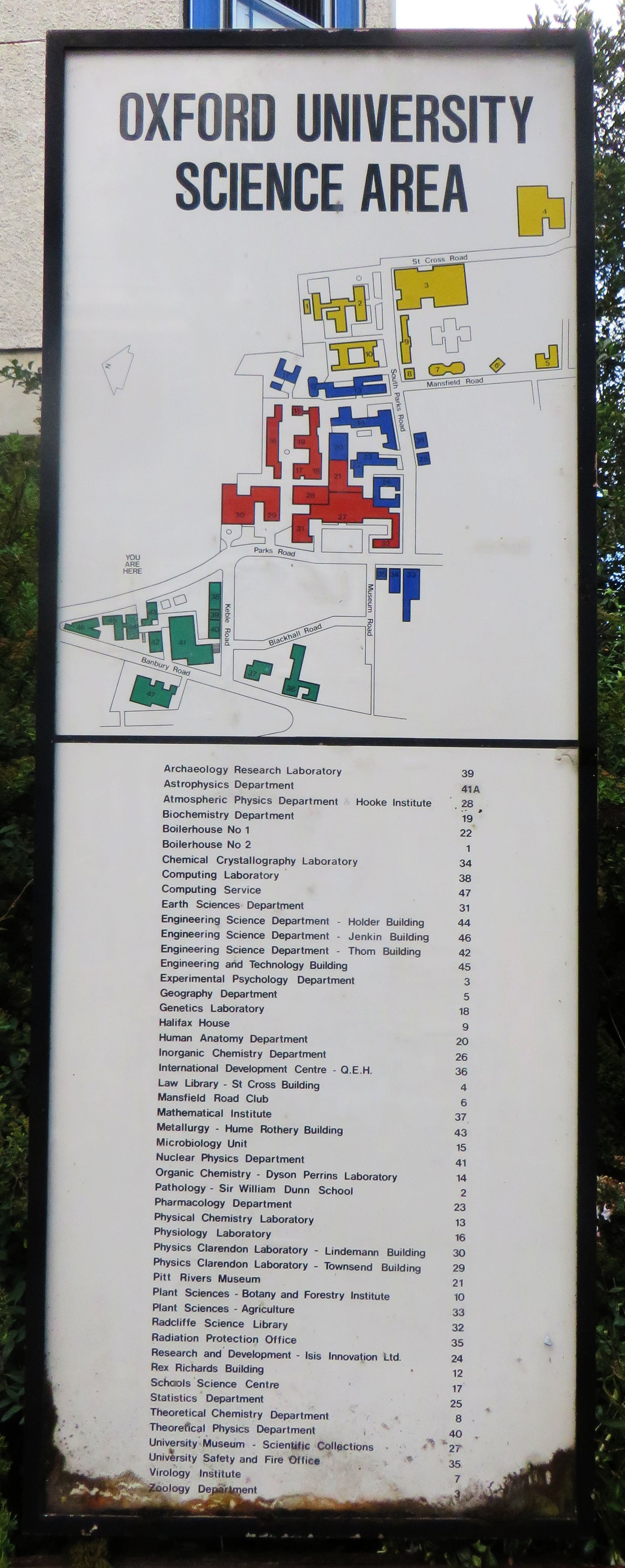
Oxford University Science Area sign on the Keble Road Triangle in Oxford

The Oxford University Science Area in Oxford, England, is where most of the science departments at the University of Oxford are located.

== Overview ==
The main part of the Science Area is located to the south of the University Parks and to the north of South Parks Road, bounded by Parks Road to the west. Some departments are also located south of South Parks Road. Close by to the northwest, further departments are located in a triangle of land bounded by the Banbury Road to the west, Keble Road to the south, and Parks Road to the northeast, opposite the University Parks, known locally as the Keble Road Triangle.

== History ==
The Oxford University Museum of Natural History opened on Parks Road in 1860. Several science departments moved within the building—astronomy, geometry, experimental physics, mineralogy, chemistry, geology, zoology, anatomy, physiology and medicine. As the departments grew in size over the years, they moved to new locations along South Parks Road.

The Radcliffe Observatory Quarter further to the west between Woodstock Road and Walton Street, where the Radcliffe Infirmary hospital used to be located, is now being developed by the university for a number of departments, following the granting of planning permission in 2009.

== Redevelopment ==
The new Biochemistry Building was designed by Hawkins\Brown, architects. Terra Firma landscape architects worked with them to design the new public interest and external facilities required by staff, researchers and students.

== Departments ==
- Biochemistry
- Chemistry:
  - Chemistry Research Laboratory
  - Chemical Biology
  - Inorganic Chemistry Laboratory
  - Organic Chemistry
  - Physical and Theoretical Chemistry Laboratory
- Computer Science (formerly the Computing Laboratory):
  - Numerical Analysis Group
  - Programming Research Group
- Earth Sciences
- Engineering Science
- E-Research Centre
- Experimental Psychology
- Oxford University Centre for the Environment
- Materials
- Mathematical Institute
- Pathology, Sir William Dunn School of
- Pharmacology
- Physics:
  - Astrophysics
  - Atmospheric, Oceanic and Planetary Physics
  - Clarendon Laboratory:
    - Atomic and Laser Physics
    - Condensed Matter Physics
  - Particle Physics
  - Theoretical Physics
- Physiology, Anatomy & Genetics
- Plant Sciences
- Research Laboratory for Archaeology and History of Art
- Zoology

== See also ==
- Begbroke Science Park
- Dyson Perrins Laboratory
- Oxford Internet Institute
- Oxford Science Park
- Radcliffe Observatory Quarter
