= Adrian Beecroft =

British venture capitalist (born 1947)

- Born: 20 May 1947 (age 79); Yorkshire, England
- Education: Hymers College; Queen's College, Oxford; Harvard Business School
- Occupation: Angel investor
- Spouse: Jacqueline Beecroft

Paul Adrian Barlow Beecroft (born 20 May 1947) is a British venture capitalist based in London. He was for many years Chief Investment Officer of the private equity group Apax. He was until recently Chairman of Dawn Capital.

Among the companies in which Beecroft has personally invested are Mimecast and Insignis.

Beecroft has donated more than £500,000 to the Conservative Party since 2006.

== Early life and education ==
Adrian Beecroft was born and raised in Yorkshire. He studied at Hymers College in Hull.

He graduated from Queen's College, Oxford with a first class honours degree in Physics in 1968 and is now an Honorary Fellow of the College. In 1976, he gained an MBA from Harvard Business School, where he studied as a Harkness Fellow. He graduated from Harvard as a Baker Scholar.

== Career ==
Adrian Beecroft has an extensive career in venture capital and private equity, specialising in IT investments. He was the Chairman of the British Venture Capital Association in 1991.

Beecroft started his career at ICL, in the computer industry. In 1973, he moved to Ocean Transport and Trading Ltd., working to develop their new business area of bulk shipping.

After graduating from Harvard Business School, Beecroft joined Boston Consulting Group in London. He became Vice President of BCG in 1982.

In 1984, Beecroft joined Apax Partners and was there for 25 years until he retired from his role as Chief Investment Officer in 2008.

In December 2006, Beecroft was appointed to the NESTA Investment Committee. At that time, NESTA was still a QUANGO.

Beecroft was awarded the BVCA's Hall of Fame honour at the Private Equity Awards in 2009. He was a member of Sir David Walker's committee on improving the transparency of the private equity industry.

In 2010, Beecroft joined Dawn Capital as the Chairman of their board.

== Beecroft Report and controversy ==
On 21 May 2012, the Beecroft Report caused considerable controversy in the UK due to its recommendations to relax regulation surrounding the dismissal of employees. The report claimed this would help to boost the economy. It was alleged that significant sections of the report had been doctored. It was also reported that some recommendations had been removed from the original draft of the report. On 21 May, Secretary of State for Business Vince Cable condemned the report, saying it was unnecessary for the government to scare workers. Beecroft responded by accusing Cable of being a socialist. He referenced his own experience of having to pay £150,000 for unfairly dismissing an HR employee as one of the many reasons behind the recommendation in the report.

== Philanthropy ==
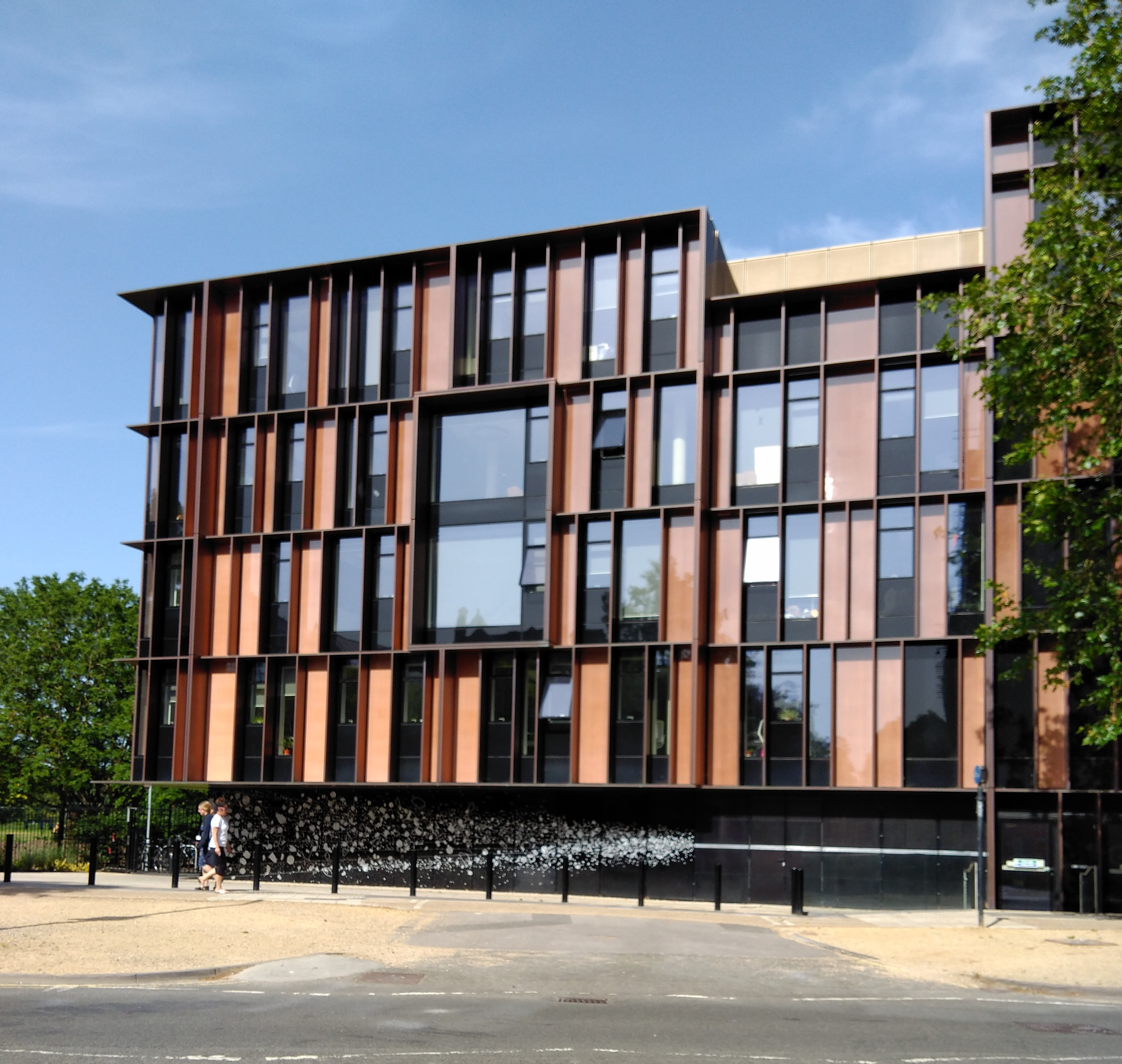
The Beecroft Building viewed from Parks Road, Oxford, completed in 2018

Beecroft helped to found and funds the Beecroft Institute of Particle Physics and Cosmology (BIPAC) at Oxford University. He has also part-funded the Beecroft Building, part of the Department of Physics in Oxford. This new building is specifically focused on theoretical, condensed matter and quantum physics. According to The Daily Telegraph, the funding for this building was inspired by Beecroft's interest in astrophysics.

Beecroft has supported his school, Hymers College in Hull. He has also been a Trustee of Impetus Trust, a social impact charity. For six years, Beecroft was also the Chairman of the Cricket Foundation, now known as Chance to Shine, a charity focused on bringing cricket back into British state school education.

Through the Beecroft Trust, Adrian and his wife sponsor the Oxford Academy, an Academy school serving a very deprived area of Oxford. Since becoming an Academy school in 2010, its results have improved dramatically from 14% of the students achieving five A* to C grades including English and Maths to 56% achieving this in 2017. However, in 2019, only 17% of pupils achieved grade 5 or above at GCSE and the school had the worst Attainment 8 and Progress 8 scores of any mainstream school in Oxfordshire. In December 2019, the Head and governing body were removed after an OFSTED inspection.

Beecroft has also supported the UNESCO initiative to preserve the Belize Barrier Reef Reserve System, which was classified as in danger on the UNESCO List of World Heritage in Danger in 2009. As of June 2018, the World Heritage Committee decided to remove the Belize Barrier Reef, which is the world's second largest coral reef, from the list.

== Personal life ==
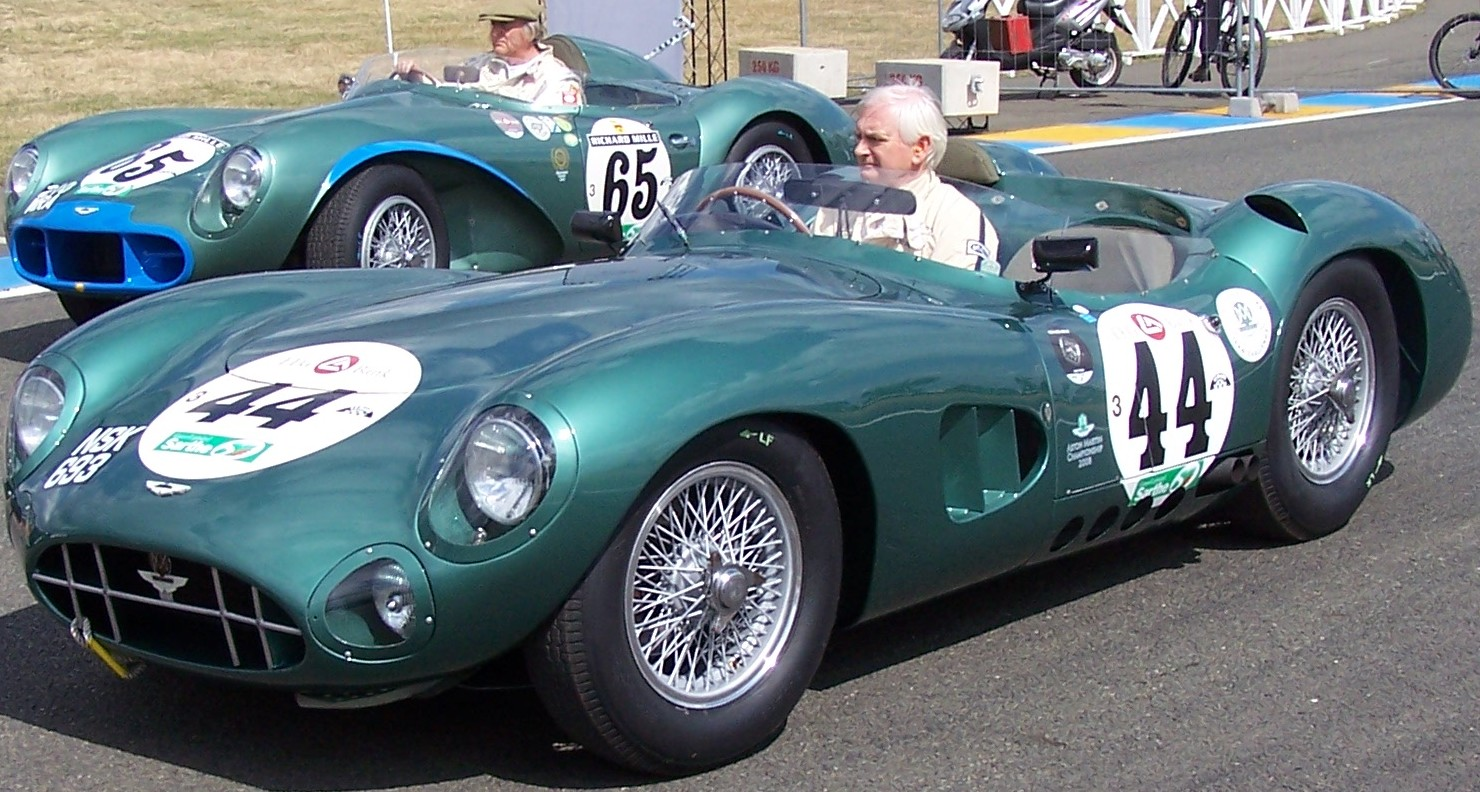
Adrian Beecroft in his Aston Martin DBR1

Beecroft lives in London and supports Lord's Cricket Ground as a Marylebone Cricket Club (MCC) Trustee. As a trustee one of his core roles is assisting with the appointment of the Chairman, but also overseeing the wellbeing of the club and cricket ground. His enthusiasm for the sport came from watching the Yorkshire County team play in Hull. He is the President of Cropredy Cricket Club for whom he still plays league cricket.

Beecroft is a supporter of the North Yorkshire Moors Railway of which he is a Vice-President. He is a keen auto-enthusiast, having an extensive collection of vehicles, including several Aston Martins, most notably a DBR1 which he races at a number of motoring events and later crashed in 2015. He is a governor of Hymers College in Hull.
