= Jacob Klein (chemist) =

- יעקב קליין
- Born: Tel Aviv, Israel
- Education: Cambridge University
- Known for: material science
- Scientific career
- Fields: Chemistry; Physics
- Workplaces: Weizmann Institute; Cambridge University
- Thesis: (1977)
- Doctoral advisor: David Tabor

Jacob Klein (Hebrew: יעקב קליין; born 1949) is the Herman Mark Professor of Soft Matter Physics at the Weizmann Institute in Rehovot, Israel. He is well known for his work in soft condensed matter, polymer science and surface science.

== Early life and career ==
Klein was born in Tel Aviv, Israel and completed secondary school in England. Following the completion of military service in Israel in 1970, Klein returned to England and was an undergraduate and graduate student at Cambridge University; his thesis was supervised by David Tabor. He held a research fellowship and later a fellowship at St. Catharine's College, Cambridge between 1976 and 1984. He held a postdoctoral fellowship at the Weizmann Institute's department of polymer research between 1977 and 1980, after which he worked jointly as university demonstrator with the Physics Department, Cambridge, and as a senior scientist at the Weizmann Institute. Klein was appointed an associate professor at the Weizmann Institute in 1984 and became a full professor in 1987, heading the institute's polymer research department from 1989 to 1991.

In October 2000 Klein left the Institute for a period, and was appointed as head of the Physical and Theoretical Chemistry Laboratory at Oxford. In 2007 he returned to the Weizmann Institute. He is a fellow of Exeter College. Klein has authored or co-authored more than 290 peer-reviewed publications, and served on the editorial boards of a number of scientific journals.

During his career, Klein has held visiting faculty positions at University of California-Santa Barbara, Princeton University, École Polytechnique Fédérale de Lausanne, École Superieure de Physique et Chimie Industrielle, Cornell University, Tsinghua University, and Beihang University.

== Honors and awards ==
He was a Dr. Lee's Professor of Chemistry at the University of Oxford (2000-2007). Klein is a fellow of the Royal Society of Chemistry (2001) and is also a fellow of the American Physical Society (2003) and the Institute of Physics (2004).

Klein received the Polymer Physics Prize from the American Physical Society (1995), and the Royal Society's Soft Matter and Biophysical Chemistry Award (2011). He was awarded the Tribology Gold Medal from the Institution of Mechanical Engineers (IMechE) in 2012. Other notable awards include the Liquid Matter Prize of the European Physical Society (2017), the Rothschild Prize (2020), and the Irving Langmuir Award of the American Physical Society (2021).
