= Oxford Academy, Oxfordshire =

The Oxford Academy

Location
- Sandy Lane West; Oxford, Oxfordshire, OX4 6JZ; England; 51°43′16″N 1°13′05″W

Information
- Type: Academy
- Motto: Enabling all to flourish
- Established: 2008
- Local authority: Oxfordshire County Council
- Trust: River Learning Trust
- Department for Education URN: 148354 Tables
- Ofsted: Reports
- Headteacher: Nora Ward
- Gender: Coeducational
- Age: 11 to 18
- Website: http://www.theoxfordacademy.org.uk/

The Oxford Academy is a coeducational secondary school and sixth form located in Littlemore, Oxford, England. Formerly Peers School, it was re-opened as an Academy in September 2008 and is the state secondary school for The Leys, Rose Hill and Littlemore..

== History ==
=== Grammar school ===
The school's origins begin with Littlemore Grammar School.

=== Comprehensive ===
In 1968 Littlemore Grammar School merged with Northfield Secondary Modern School to form Oxford's first comprehensive school - the Peers School.

== The Academy ==
The Oxford Academy opened in September 2008 on the site of Peers School, which had been designated a failing school. It initially used the existing buildings from the former school. In March 2009 the construction of a new, purpose-built £33 million school building was approved by Oxfordshire County Council. The new building was opened to pupils in February 2011. The Academy was placed in special measures in January 2013, following an Ofsted inspection in November 2012. David Brown was appointed headmaster as a result of the inspection. In January 2015 the school's rating was improved and it was taken out of special measures. However following a subsequent inspection in 2019 the Academy was rated "inadequate" and returned to special measures.

The Academy's sponsors are Beecroft Trust (a charitable initiative of venture capitalist Adrian Beecroft), the Diocese of Oxford, and Oxford Brookes University. It has 1,267 students, including a sixth form. Class sizes are smaller than average in the state sector, with between 20 and 25 students in a class rather than between 25 and 30. After being returned to special measures in 2020 an interim academy board and intermin headteacher, David Terry, were appointed to oversee planned changes. In March 2020 Nora Ward was appointed as the new permanent headteacher from September 2020.

== Notable former pupils ==
=== Littlemore Grammar School ===
- Ursula Buchan, gardening columnist and author, daughter of William Buchan, 3rd Baron Tweedsmuir, and granddaughter of John Buchan (The Thirty-Nine Steps and Governor General of Canada from 1935–40)

=== Peers School ===
- Antonia Boström, art curator and author at the V&A, step-daughter of Sir Norman Hulbert
- Eloise Millar, novelist (from 1988–91)
