= Department of Physics, University of Oxford =

Physics department at Oxford University

Coordinates: 51.75997°N 1.2565°W

Department of Physics
- Type: Private
- Parent institution: University of Oxford
- Location: Oxford, England, United Kingdom
- Website: www.physics.ox.ac.uk

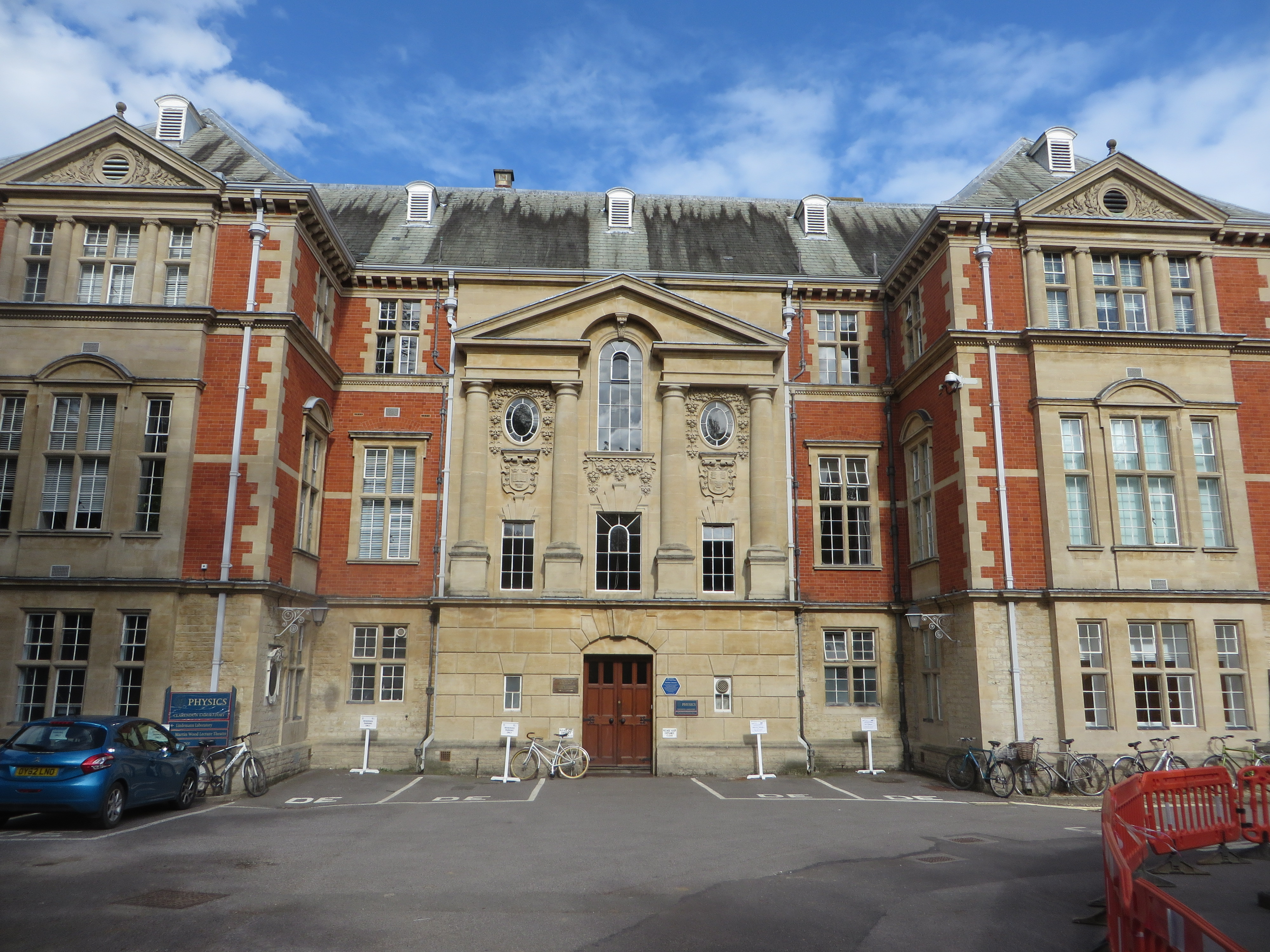
The Clarendon Laboratory - Townsend Building front facade

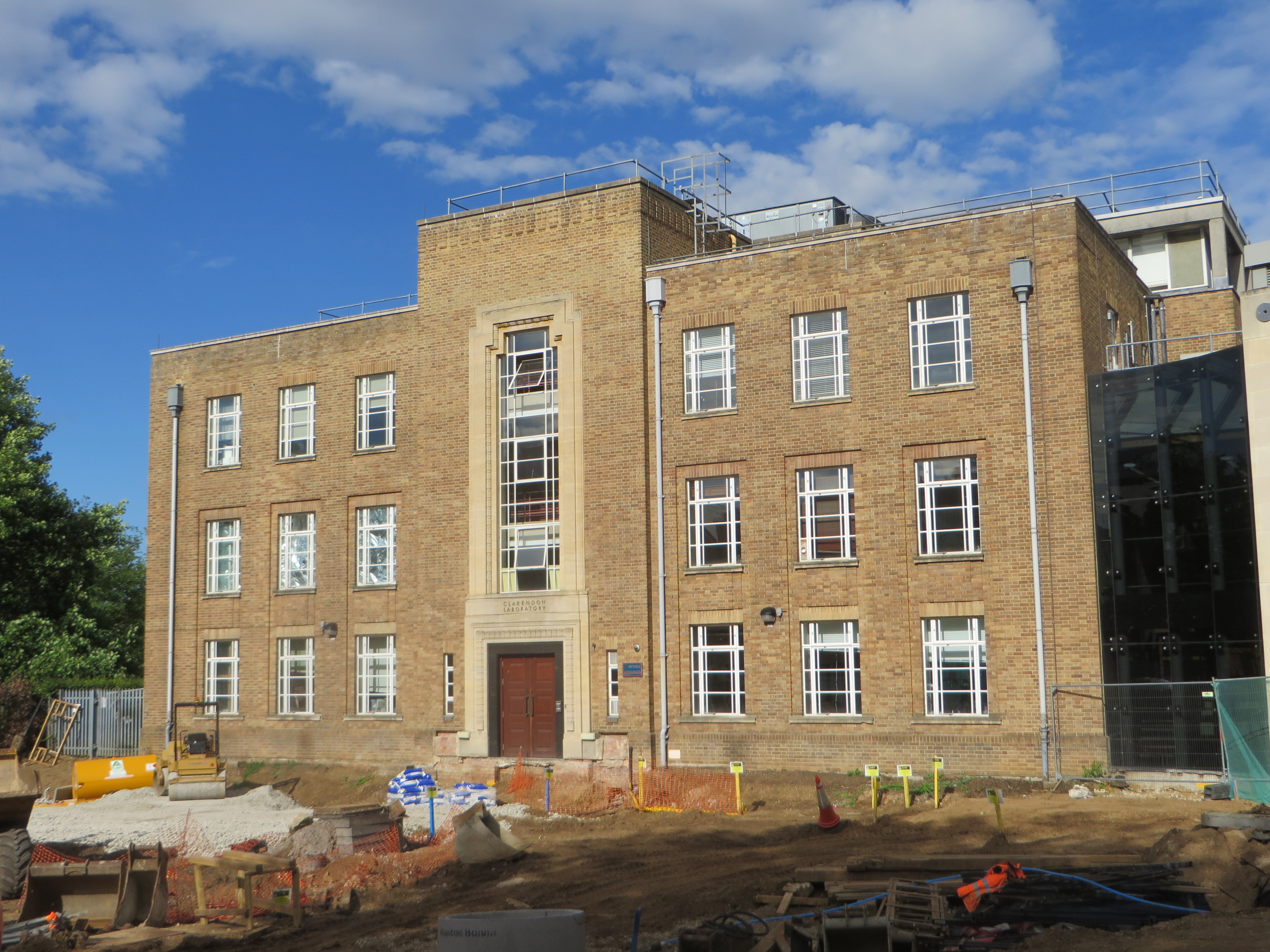
The Lindemann Building (part of the Clarendon Laboratory) with the site of the new Beecroft Building (completed 2018) in front

The Department of Physics is an academic department at the Mathematical, Physical and Life Sciences Division at the University of Oxford in Oxford, England, United Kingdom.

The department consists of multiple buildings and sub-departments including the Clarendon Laboratory, Denys Wilkinson's building, Dobson Square and the Beecroft building. Each of these facilities contribute in studying different sub-types of physics such as Atomic and Laser Physics, Astrophysics, Theoretical Physics, etc. The physics division have made scientific contributions towards this branch of science since the establishment of the department.

== Facilities ==
Clarendon Laboratory

The Clarendon Laboratory was constructed at the University of Oxford in 1872. The building was named after Edward Hyde, who was the 1st Earl of Clarendon, making it the oldest physics laboratory built in England. The Clarendon building was designed by a British scientist named Robert Bellamy Clifton, who made the laboratory a space for undergraduates to prepare for their examinations rather than for research purposes only. In 1908, an architect named Sir Thomas Graham Jackson designed the Townsend building, which was a structure that became part of the Clarendon laboratory. The intent of this construction was to expand the role of the Clarendon building, as a laboratory and a teaching space. In terms of its architecture, the Townsend building was constructed with red-orange brickwork featured with a stonework detailed staircase and hallway.

The architecture of the Townsend building was designed by Sir Thomas Graham Jackson. The style he used for the structure was a Neo-Classical design, which draws on inspiration from the Western cultural movement in decorative and visual arts. Jackson refused to implement the Gothic style of architecture in the Townsend building as he intended to keep the design minimal. His choice of architectural style was influenced by his own sympathies towards the gradual movement of Oxford.

The Townsend building has made some internal changes as small laboratory spaces have replaced regions of the wide-open lecture theatre. This central lecture theatre that was two levels high has now been divided into two single level floors and has become the 'Institute of Experimental photonics'. Structures within the Townsend building that have remained the same include the entrance hall and the monumental double staircase. These drastic changes to the internal structure of these historical buildings allows the atomic and laser physics and the condensed matter physics sub-departments to be connected throughout the Lindemann, Townsend and Simon buildings.

The later construction of the Lindemann building was intended to show a basic design. The simplicity of the Lindemann building was displayed at the front elevation with two symmetrical wings around the rectangular tower. The colour of the building was unique in comparison to the Townsend building, but exhibited a plain and unwelcoming appearance. The physical connection between the Lindemann and Townsend building was through the Martin Wood lecture theatre, at the front elevations of both structures. The connection between these two structures was made using darkened glass panels, which makes an obvious appearance of separation due to the contrasting colours of each building.

During 1919, a British physicist named Frederick Lindemann became the professor of experimental philosophy and the director of Clarendon laboratory. He was responsible for making the laboratory more recognisable for its expertise in low temperature physics as well as to elevate the status of science at the University of Oxford. Lindemann's success in making the laboratory more recognised led to him opening up a new building of the Clarendon Laboratory in 1939, which was located north of the Electrical laboratory.

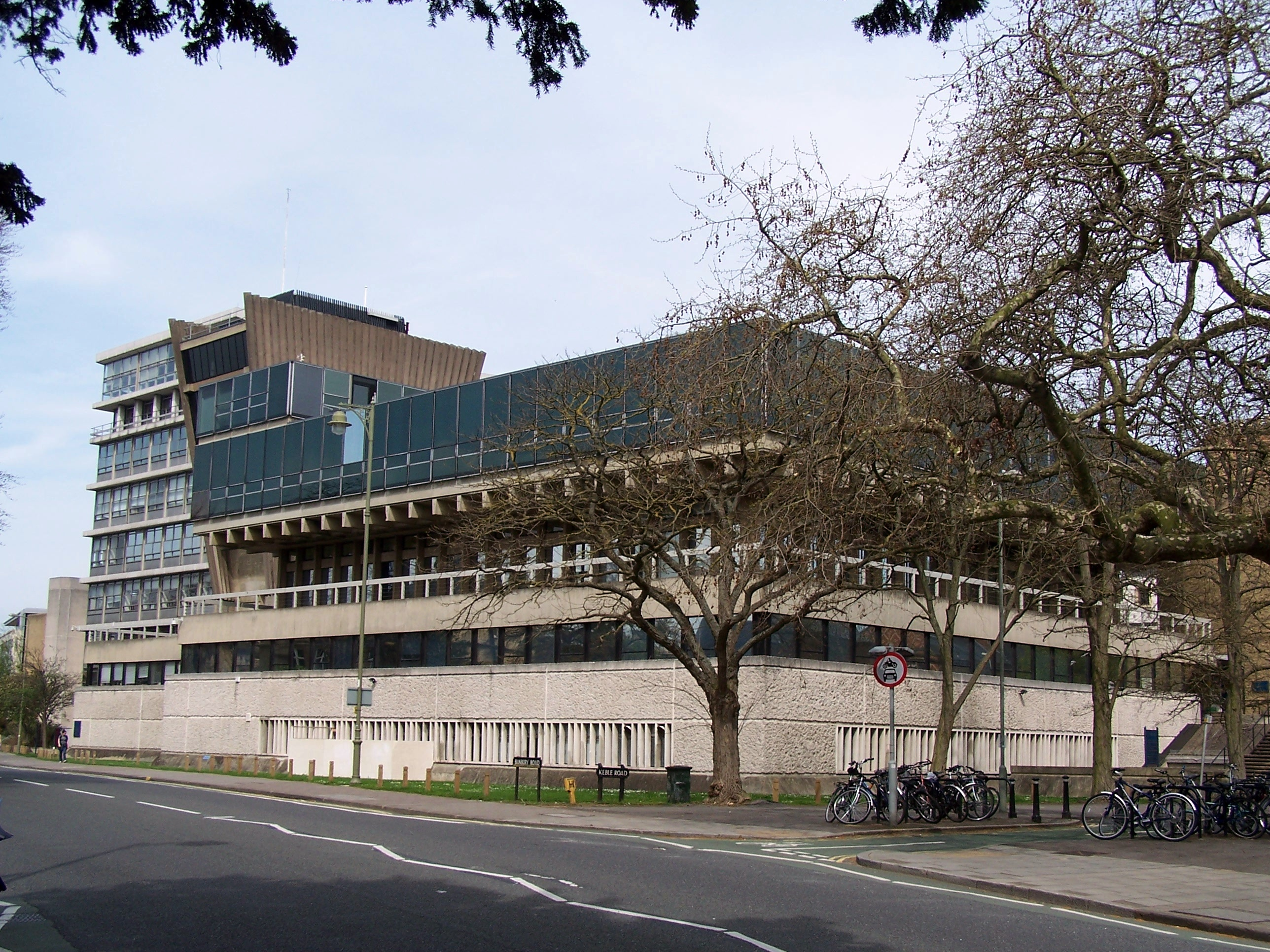
The Denys Wilkinson Building from the Banbury Road

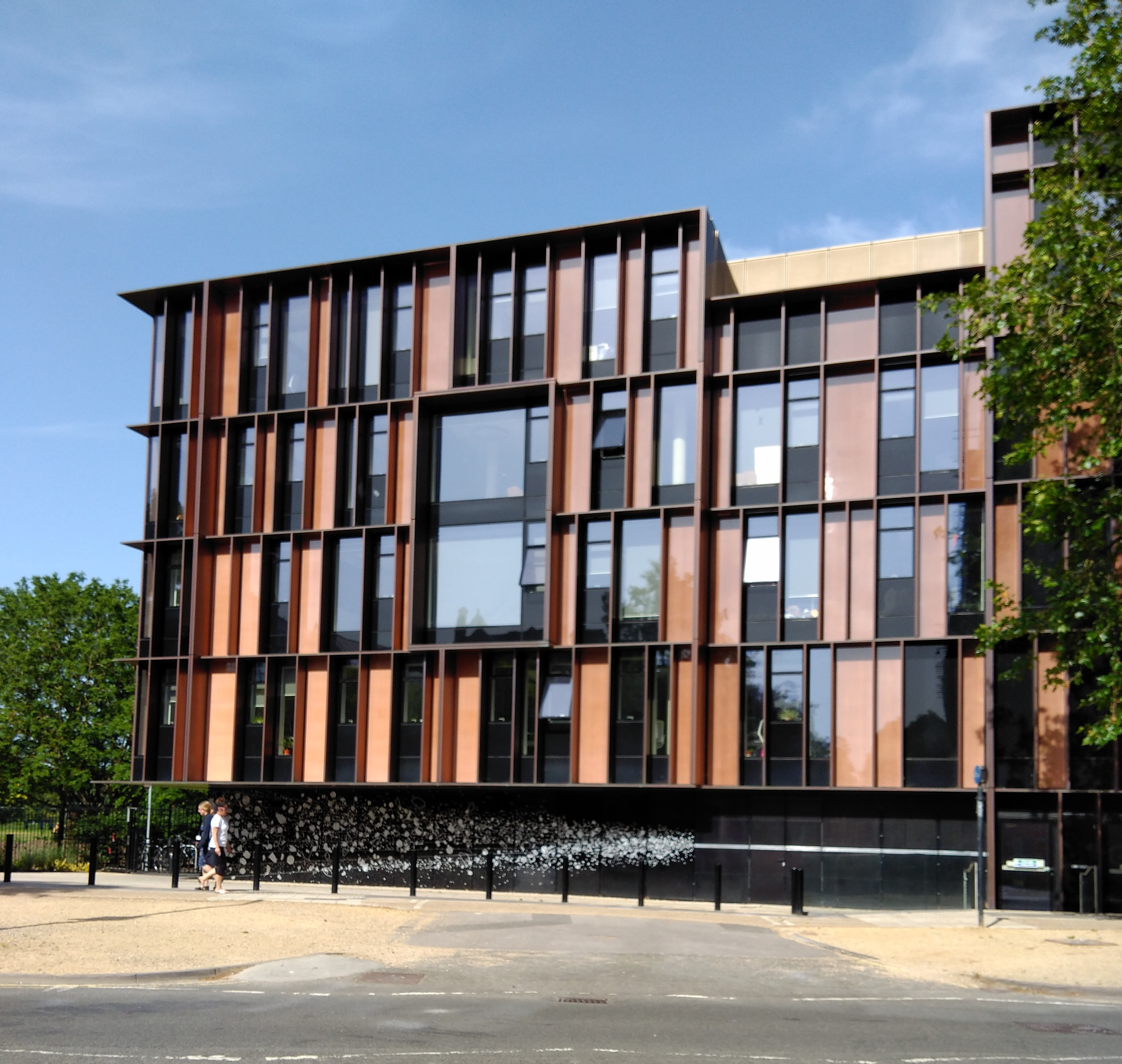
The Beecroft Building viewed from Parks Road, Oxford

Denys Wilkinson Building

The Denys Wilkinson Building is another facility located in the Department of Physics, along Banbury Road, which was constructed in honour of Denys Wilkinson during the 1960s. This building focuses on the studies of Astrophysics and Particle Physics. This facility was originally known as the 'Department of Nuclear Physics' and the 'Nuclear Physics Laboratory'. The unique architecture of the Wilkinson building appears as a large fan-shaped superstructure which was designed to house a Van der Graaf generator.

Beecroft Building

The Beecroft Building is a new construction at the Department of Physics, which was designed by architects Hawkins\Brown in 2018. It is located directly in front of the Clarendon laboratory along Parks Road. This section of the physics department was dedicated towards Adrian Beecroft, who contributed to the funding of the 50-million-pound project. The sub-types of physics that this facility focuses on includes theoretical and experimental physics. This building was constructed to unite researchers who study theoretical and experimental physics and allow them to collaborate in controlled conditions. The architecture of this building consists of a combination of bronze, glass and expanded copper mesh insert panels accompanied by a grid of weathering bronze fins. The physical structure of the building was built 16 metres underground to accommodate the "Carfax height" policy, which does not allow buildings in central Oxford to be higher than 18 metres. The 16-metre basement was also designed for specific laboratories that require vibrational isolation.

== Branches of physics ==
Atomic Physics is the study of an atom's structure and the energy states it possesses. With these properties, they have the ability to interact with other atoms through either electric or magnetic fields. The concepts involved in atomic physics include atomic structure, atoms in external fields, atom interactions with light and atomic collisions.

Astrophysics is a division of physics that focuses on the relationship between physics and space and the study of stars, planets and galaxies. The research of this branch of physics is conducted at the Denys Wilkinson building. In the 1700s, an astronomer known as Thomas Hornsby conducted studies at Oxford and became the Savilian Professor of Astronomy in 1763. During 1793, Thomas Hornsby funded the construction for the first observatory building at Oxford.

Theoretical Physics is associated with the theory behind the subject as well as the application of mathematical models, which are used to describe and predict various hypotheses. This sub-type of physics goes hand in hand with the contrasting experimental physics. Both of these sub-types are being studied in the Beecroft Building.

Particle Physics primarily focuses on the interactions and properties of subatomic particles. This type of physics is closely related to atomic physics as it shares the same concept of atom analysis. Along with astrophysics, this sub-genre has also been under research in the Denys Wilkinson building at Oxford.

Atmospheric Physics is the study of the Earth's atmosphere in relation to the weather. This branch of physics particularly focuses on the middle and upper atmospheric layers and its distinguishing features. This sub-type of physics is correlated to other studies such as meteorology and climatology. The study of this division at Oxford commenced in 1920, as a meteorology lecturer named G.M.B. Dobson became a part of the Clarendon laboratory.

== Scientific contributions ==
Scientists that have conducted research at Oxford have made contributions to science including developments in technology and applications in the medical fields.

Edmund Halley was a young astronomer who made discoveries in relation to the stars. The young astronomer sailed to an island named St. Helena to make observations of stars and broaden his star catalogue. Edmund became the first person to make telescopic observations of the stars in the southern hemisphere and had discovered a star cluster in the constellation of Centaurus during the 1690s. Halley further developed his research by creating the first maps of the geomagnetic field and the prevailing winds, which is also known as the first meteorological chart. In collaboration with Robert Hooke, both scientists tried to solve the problem of planetary orbits and discussed theories with Isaac Newton. In 1704, Edmund Halley became the Savilian Professor of Geometry at Oxford university which then lead to him publishing 'A Synopsis of the Astronomy of Comets', which explains his theory of multiple comets being identical. Other discoveries Halley made in later years include his calculation of the distance from the Earth to the Sun, which was determined by observing transits of Venus across the disk of the Sun.

Astronomer James Bradley became a student at Oxford university in 1711. Bradley became the Savilian Professor of Astronomy at Oxford from 1721 to 1742. His contributions he made while studying at Oxford include his observations of Stellar Aberration (an apparent motion of celestial objects caused by the Earth's orbital velocity), which is when he determined the value of the speed of light as 2.95 × 10^{8} m/s. Other contributions Bradley made include his discovery of the annual change in declination, which was apparent due to the rocking motion of the Earth's axis through the gravitational attraction of the Moon.

American astronomer Edwin Hubble became a student of astrophysics at Oxford university. Hubble attended Oxford for three years to study philosophy, which allowed him to acquire a bachelor's degree in jurisprudence. His contributions towards the astrophysics field include his proof of the expanding universe as well as his creation of a classification system used to determine the different types of galaxies. His discoveries of countless galaxies beyond the Milky Way revolutionised our perception of the universe that we live in. In 1990, a telescope was launched into the Earth's low orbit known as the Hubble Space Telescope, which was named after Edwin Hubble.

British astronomer Sir Martin Ryle studied at Oxford university in the 1930s. His contributions towards the physics world include his development of revolutionary radio telescope systems. Ryle had made discoveries such as observing the most distant galaxy of the universe that existed. During World War II, Ryle designed radar equipment as he took part in working with the Telecommunications Research Establishment. Sir Martin Ryle collaborated with another British astrophysicist named Antony Hewish and shared the Nobel Prize for physics in 1974, for their discovery of pulsars.

Physicist Erwin Schrödinger became the Nobel prize winner in 1933 for physics. Schrödinger was born and raised in Austria and attended Oxford university for three years. The theoretical physicist came up with an important wave equation that is used to describe how the electrons of an atom move as a wave function.

Theoretical physicist Stephen Hawking made several contributions to theoretical physics. The British-born physicist grew up in Oxford and became an undergraduate at Oxford university. His contributions as a scientist include his ability to explain the theory behind black holes and the concept of time travel. Hawking also came up with the discovery of Hawking radiation, which is the electromagnetic radiation emitted by a black hole. Other contributions Hawking made include his collaboration with Roger Penrose, on the theorems of gravitational singularity.

During the 1900s, Professor Frederick Lindemann and his father created a sensitive photo-electric cell which has the ability to detect light that comes from stars and comets. Other contributions Lindemann had made involved mathematics, where he contributed to the theory of prime numbers. A few years later, Lindemann recruited scientists from Germany and made the concept of low temperature physics more significant at the Clarendon laboratory. Studies that were conducted by Lindemann included research on liquid helium and its thermal properties, as well as the study of superconductors. Lindemann's contributions in physics led to him playing a role in war by applying his experimental skills to atomic bomb and radar projects.

Another scientist that contributed research at the Clarendon laboratory was Derek Jackson, who conducted the first experiment on determining the nuclear magnetic spin of caesium. Other researchers at Clarendon include Heinrich Kuhn, who found a way to make use of atomic beams by applying the Doppler effect.

In 1945, scientist James Griffiths made the discovery of ferromagnetic resonance through the concept of microwave spectroscopy.

== Notable people ==
Throughout the history at the Oxford physics department, some significant contributions have been made to physics by various researchers since the 18th century. Some of these scientists include:

- Robert Hooke (English Philosopher)
- Edmond Halley (English Astronomer)
- Edwin Hubble (American Astronomer)
- Stephen Hawking (Theoretical Physicist)
- Frederick Lindemann, 1st Viscount Cherwell (British Physicist)
- Erwin Schrödinger (Nobel Prize Physicist)
- Tim Berners-Lee (Inventor of World Wide Web)
- Ernest Ambler (British-American Physicist)
- Neil Ferguson (British Epidemiologist)
- Sir Christopher Llewellyn Smith (Emeritus Professor of Physics)
- Dennis W. Sciama (British Physicist)
- Ian Walmsley (Hooke Professor of Experimental Physics)
- James Bradley (English Astronomer)
- Martin Ryle (Nobel Prize Astronomer)

As of 2018, academics include:

- Steven Balbus, Savilian Professor of Astronomy
- Laura Herz, Professor of Physics
- Raymond Pierrehumbert, Halley Professor of Physics
- Paolo Radaelli, Dr Lee's Professor of Physics
- Graham Ross FRS, Emeritus Professor of Physics
- Henry Snaith, Professor of Physics
- John Wheater, Professor of Physics, Head of Department (2010–18)
- Ian Shipsey, Professor of Physics, Head of Department (2018–24)
