= 1835 in the United Kingdom =

Events from the year 1835 in the United Kingdom.

== Incumbents ==
- Monarch – William IV
- Prime Minister – Robert Peel (Conservative) (until 8 April); William Lamb, 2nd Viscount Melbourne (Whig) (starting 18 April)
- Foreign Secretary – Arthur Wellesley, 1st Duke of Wellington (until 18 April) Henry John Temple, 3rd Viscount Palmerston (starting 18 April)
- Home Secretary – Henry Goulburn (until 18 April) Lord John Russell (starting 18 April)
- Secretary of War – Lord Aberdeen (until 8 April) Charles Grant (starting 18 April)

== Events ==
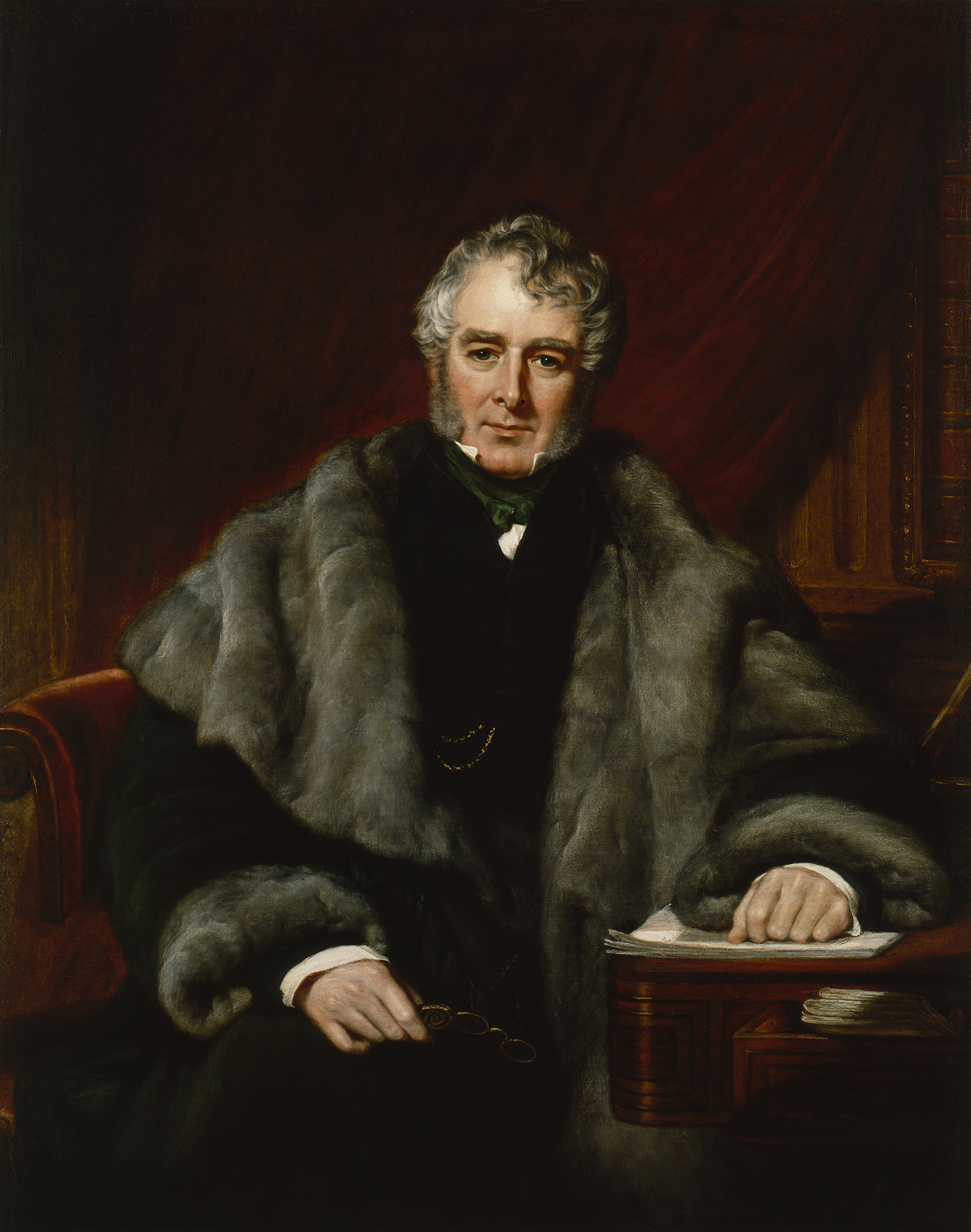
Portrait of Lord Melbourne by John Partridge. Melbourne returned for a second term as Prime Minister on 18 April.

- 6 January–6 February – General election won by the Whigs, but Robert Peel initially remains in office, at the request of King William IV.
- 2 March – Opening of the Birmingham and Liverpool Junction Canal from Nantwich to Autherley Junction, Wolverhampton, the last major trunk narrow canal to be built and the final work of Thomas Telford (died 1834).
- 23 March – Marie Tussaud moves her wax museum, Madame Tussauds, to a permanent location in Baker Street, London.
- 18 April – Lord Melbourne succeeds Peel as Prime Minister.
- 1 May – Charles Chubb granted a patent for a burglar-resistant safe.
- 18 June – An underground explosion at Wallsend Colliery kills 102.
- 14 July – Organisation of the universal Catholic Apostolic Church.
- 25 July – The first demonstration of an incandescent light bulb is made by James Bowman Lindsay in Dundee, Scotland.
- August – Henry Fox Talbot exposes the world's first known photographic negatives at Lacock Abbey in Wiltshire.
- 25 August
  - Prisons Act aims to secure greater uniformity in practice across prisons in England and Wales and introduces Inspectors of Prisons.
  - Independent Order of Rechabites founded as the Salford Unity of Rechabites as part of the temperance movement.
- 31 August – Acts of Parliament passed:
  - Marriage Act prohibits marriage with a deceased wife's sister, although validating all existing such marriages.
  - Highway Act codifies the laws relating to highways, removes liability to statutory labour and makes parish surveyors responsible for upkeep of roads.
  - Great Western Railway incorporated.
- 7 September – Charles Darwin arrives at the Galapagos Islands aboard HMS Beagle.
- 9 September – Municipal Corporations Act modernises local government in towns and cities and gives the new authorities power to appoint police.
- 10 September – The Cruelty to Animals Act extends protection of domesticated animals from maltreatment, including outright prohibition on bear-baiting and cockfighting in England and Wales.
- 15 November – Weobley in Herefordshire is the site of the consecration of the first Roman Catholic chapel in England since the Reformation.
- 27 November – Two men, James Pratt and John Smith, are hanged in front of Newgate Prison in London after a conviction of buggery. They are the last to suffer capital punishment for homosexual acts in England.

=== Undated ===
- Coalville in Leicestershire is the site of the establishment of the first Roman Catholic monastery in England since the Reformation, the Cistercians' Mount St. Bernard.
- The county town of Cornwall is transferred from Launceston to Bodmin.
- British Geological Survey founded as the Ordnance Geological Survey, under Henry De la Beche, the world's first national geological survey.
- Geological Museum founded as The Museum of Practical Geology in London.
- In geology, Roderick Murchison names the Silurian period, and Adam Sedgwick the Cambrian.
- Maria Callcott's Little Arthur's History of England is published.
- Thornton's Bookshop is opened by Joseph Thornton, Oxford's oldest bookshop until it closes in 2002.

== Births ==
- 3 January – Fanny Cornforth, born Sarah Cox, artists' model (died 1909)
- 15 January – Arthur Pember, first president of The Football Association (died 1886 in the United States)
- 4 April – John Hughlings Jackson, neurologist (died 1911)
- 3 May – Alfred Austin, poet (died 1913)
- 27 May – Emily Faithfull, women's rights activist (died 1895)
- 6 July – George White, field marshal (died 1912)
- 17 July – Thomas Erskine Holland, academic lawyer (died 1926)
- 27 August – Thomas Burberry, businessman and inventor (died 1926)
- 1 September – William Stanley Jevons, economist (died 1882)
- 4 October – Mary Elizabeth Braddon, novelist (died 1915)
- 25 November – Andrew Carnegie, Scottish-American steel magnate and philanthropist (died 1919 in the United States)
- 4 December – Samuel Butler, novelist and poet (died 1902)
- 28 December – Archibald Geikie, Scottish-born geologist (died 1924)

== Deaths ==
- 13 February – Henry Hunt, orator and radical politician (born 1773)
- 30 March – Richard Sharp, politician, merchant, critic, poet, conversationalist and wit (born 1759 in Newfoundland)
- 17 April – William Henry Ireland, poet and forger of Shakespeariana (born 1775)
- 13 May – John Nash, architect (born 1752)
- 16 May – Felicia Hemans, poet (born 1793)
- 18 June – William Cobbett, journalist and author (born 1763)
- 28 June – Charles Mathews, comic actor and theatre manager (born 1776)
- 5 July – Sir Edward Banks, civil engineering contractor (born 1770)
- 23 August – Isaac Pocock, dramatist (born 1782)
- 29 August – Nathaniel William Peach, politician (born 1785)
- 30 August – William T. Barry, United States Senator from Kentucky from 1814 to 1816 and U.S. Postmaster General from 1829 to 1835 (born 1784 in the United States)
- 14 September – John Brinkley, astronomer (born 1763)
- 1 November – William Motherwell, Scottish poet, antiquary and journalist (born 1797)
- 19 November – Thomas Linley the elder, bass singer and founder of a musical dynasty (born 1733)
- 21 November – James Hogg, the "Ettrick Shepherd", poet and novelist (born 1770)
- 1 December – Charles Hayter, painter (born 1761)
