= King's Arms, Oxford =

The King's Arms
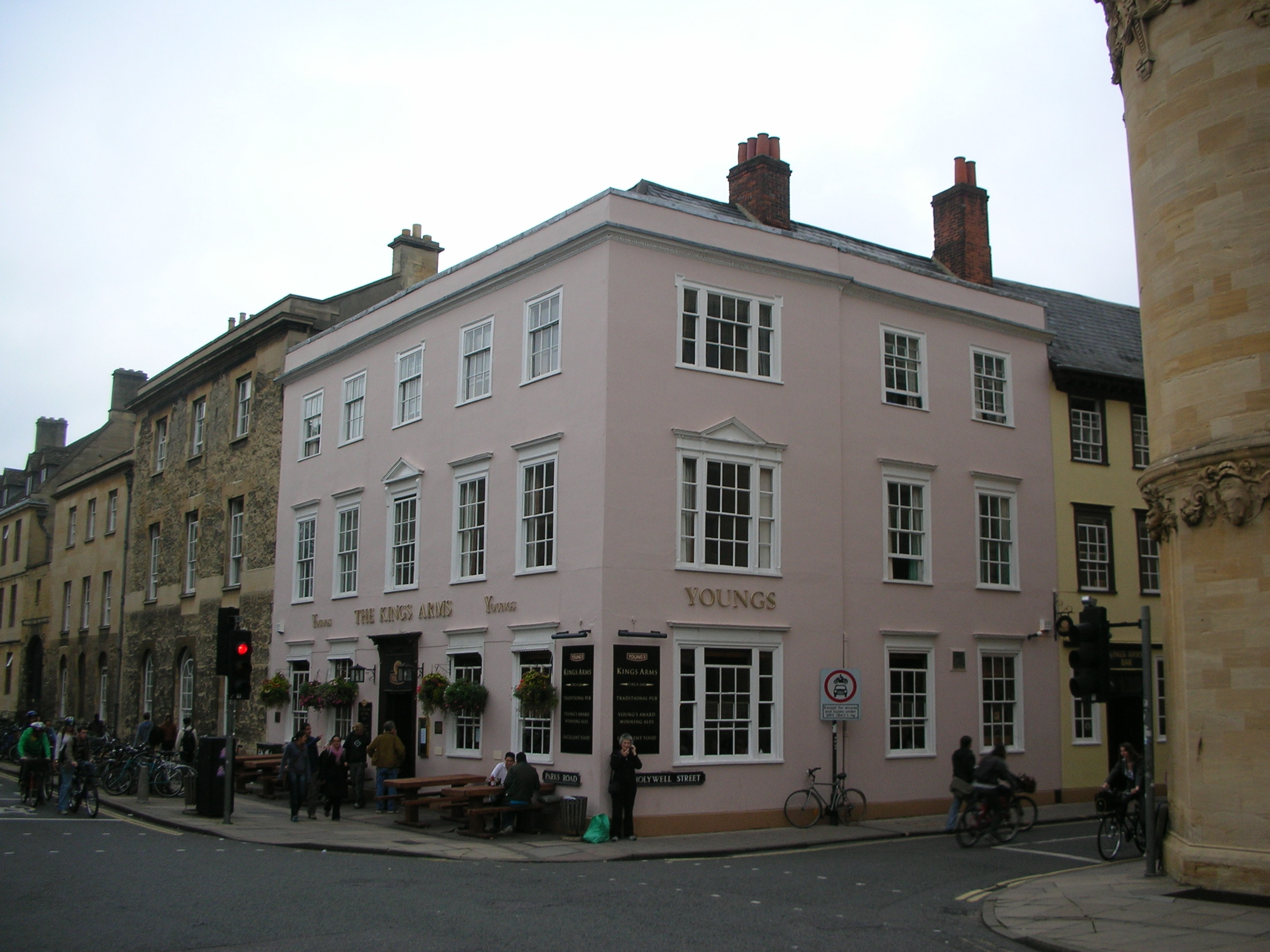
- The King's Arms on the corner of Parks Road (left) and Holywell Street (right)

- Location within Oxford city centre

General information
- Location: 40 Holywell Street, Oxford, OX1 3SP, England
- Coordinates: 51°45′18″N 1°15′16″W
- Opened: 18 September 1607
- Owner: Wadham College, Oxford / Young's Brewery

Website
- kingsarmsoxford.co.uk

The King's Arms (colloquially known as the KA) is one of the main student pubs in Oxford, England. It claims to be the oldest pub in Oxford.

== Overview ==
The King's Arms pub is positioned on the corner of Parks Road and Holywell Street, opposite the New Bodleian Library building. It is nearby Broad Street and the Clarendon Building, (part of Oxford University). A local myth has it that the pub has the highest IQ per square foot of any pub or bar in the world. The pub is owned by Wadham College, which is located to the north.

== History ==
The site was originally occupied by buildings erected by Augustinian friars in 1268. After the Dissolution of the Monasteries in 1540, the land passed to the City of Oxford.

The lease book of Oxford Council in 1607 stated "Thomas Franklyn has licence to set up an inn with the sign of the King's Arms". Franklyn's choice of the name refers to King James I (reigned 1603–1625), who was involved with Wadham College, immediately to the north. It opened on 18 September 1607.

In the 17th century, the King's Arms was a popular location for plays. In the early 18th century, the south side and rear were rebuilt; the west frontage was added in the late 18th century. The King's Arms was variously, a coaching inn (by 1771) and, before Wadham College reclaimed upper stories of the building in the 1960s, a hotel, once popular with commercial travellers.

Graham Greene, in his interviews with biographer Norman Sherry, identified the King's Arms as the pub where he and Kim Philby, among other intelligence officers, shared drinks around 1944. Greene was known to have been a practical joker in the comfortable confines of the pub as per Philby's recollections. It was around this time Philby wanted to promote Greene, who rejected promotion and resigned.

It was said that some dons held tutorials (up until the 1970s) in the back bar, known as 'The Don's Bar'. Until 1973, this bar was not open to women, the last such bar in Oxford. The same year, a fire broke out in the bar, leading to the rumor it was started by feminists (the real cause was an electrical fault).

The room now known as 'The Office' was in fact the landlord's office until 1992, when it was converted into extra bar space.

The pub became a Young's pub in 1991.
