= Parks Road =

Road in Oxford, England

Coordinates: 51.75896°N 1.25699°W

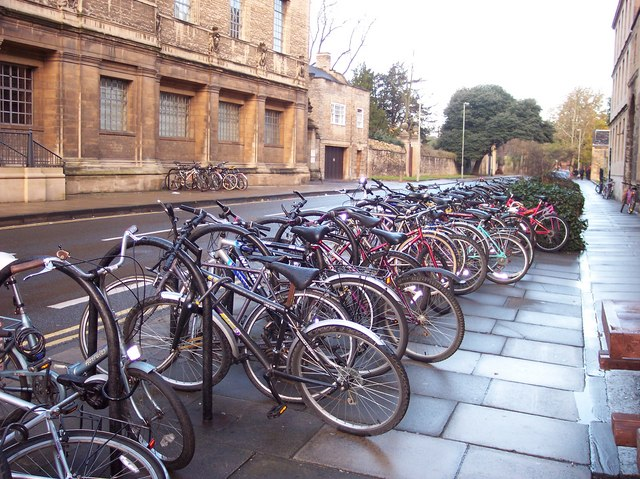
Looking north up Parks Road outside the King's Arms public house, with the New Bodleian Library building, reopened as the Weston Library in 2015.

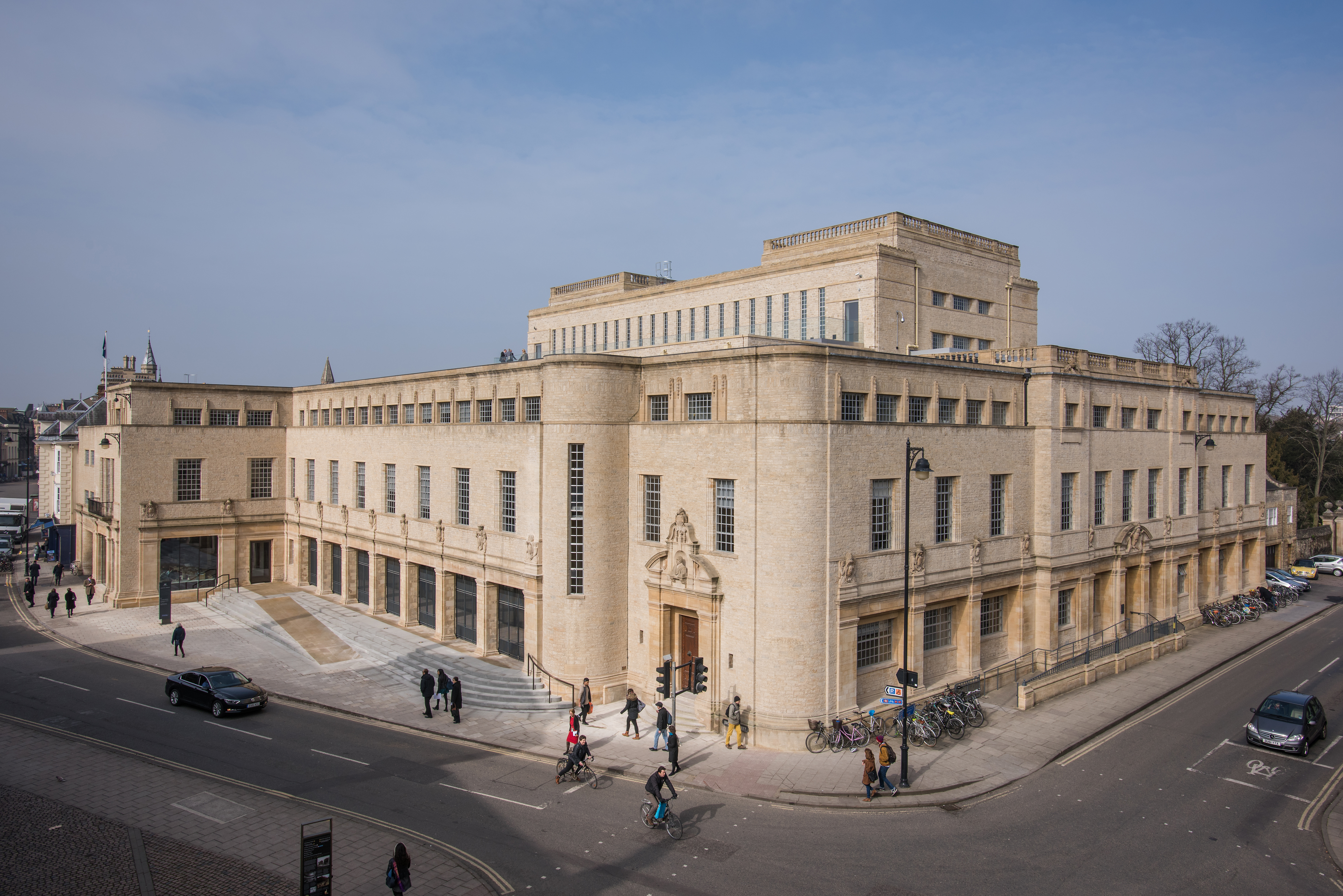
View of the Weston Library with Parks Road on the right and Broad Street on the left.

Parks Road is a road in Oxford, England, with several Oxford University colleges along its route. It runs north–south from the Banbury Road and Norham Gardens at the northern end, where it continues into Bradmore Road, to the junction with Broad Street, Holywell Street and Catte Street to the south.

At the northern end, the road runs alongside the University Parks, hence its name. Opposite the Parks is the former home of the Irish novelist Joyce Cary, who lived here at 12 Parks Road with his family from 1920 until his death in 1957. This is now recorded with a blue plaque.

The road adjoins South Parks Road to the east about halfway along. Parks Road, South Parks Road and the Parks surround the main Science Area of the University of Oxford. The Clarendon Laboratory (physics), Department of Engineering Science (including the dominating 1960s Thom Building) and the Department of Materials are all on Parks Road in the main science area. The Department of Computer Science is opposite the Parks on the corner with Keble Road.

Both Keble College (south of Keble Road and north of Museum Road) and Wadham College have their main entrances on Parks Road, while St John's College and Trinity College each back onto it. The garden of Rhodes House has an entrance on Parks Road. In December 2018 it was announced that the proposed new graduate college of the university, Parks College, opening in September 2020, will be located on Parks Road, after which it is named.

The Oxford University Museum of Natural History is on the east side of Parks Road opposite Keble College. Just to the south on the corner with South Parks Road is the Radcliffe Science Library. The right hand half of the grass area in front of the museum has a large basement reading room for the library underneath it.

At the southern end are the Weston Library, opened in 2015 after being transformed internally from the 20th-century New Bodleian Library building, on the corner with Broad Street to the west and the King's Arms public house on the corner with Holywell Street to the east.

The road was formerly known as Park Street.

== Gallery ==
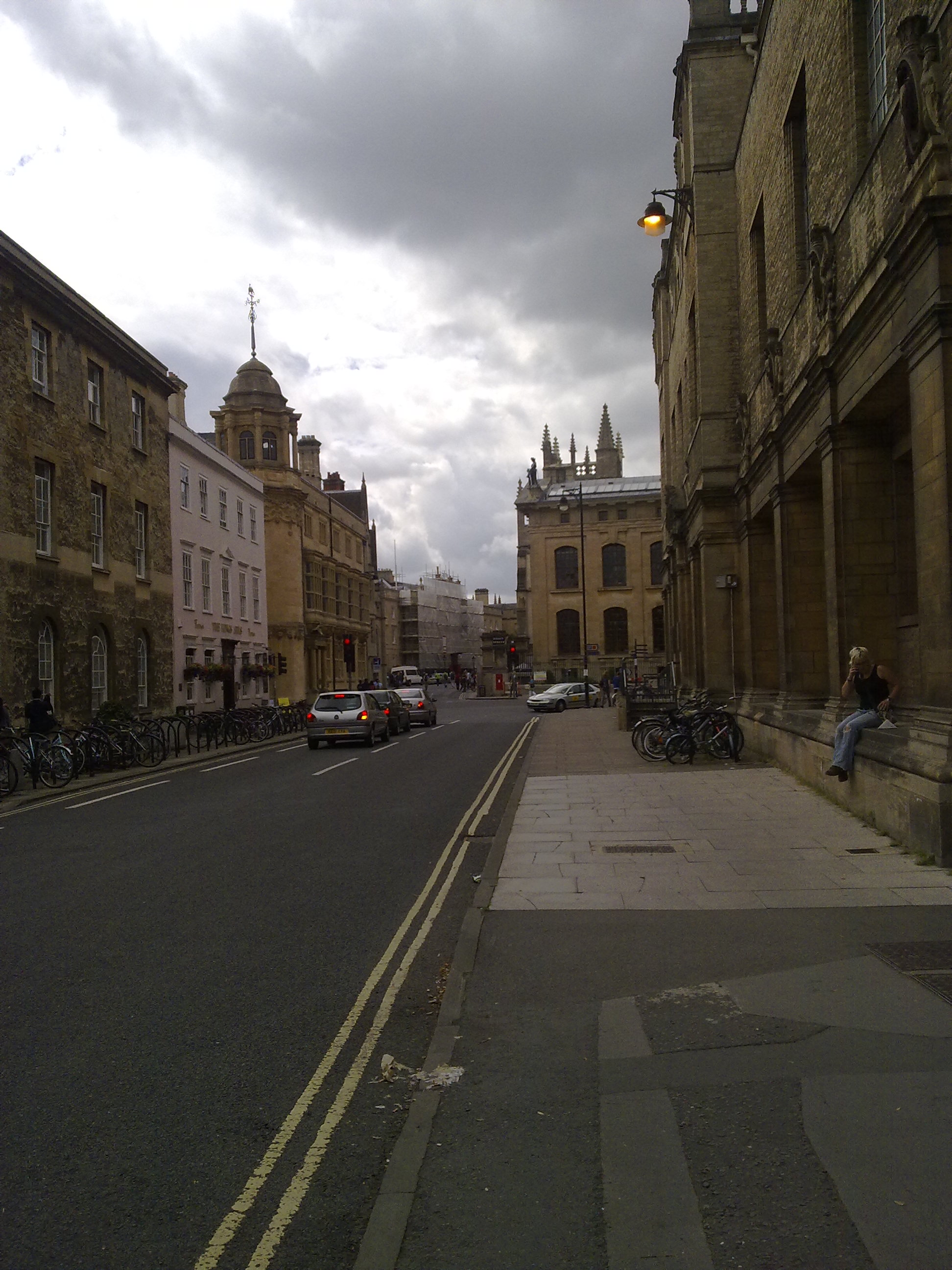
The southern end of Parks Road, looking south with the New Bodleian Library on the right, and the Clarendon Building and Indian Institute in the background.

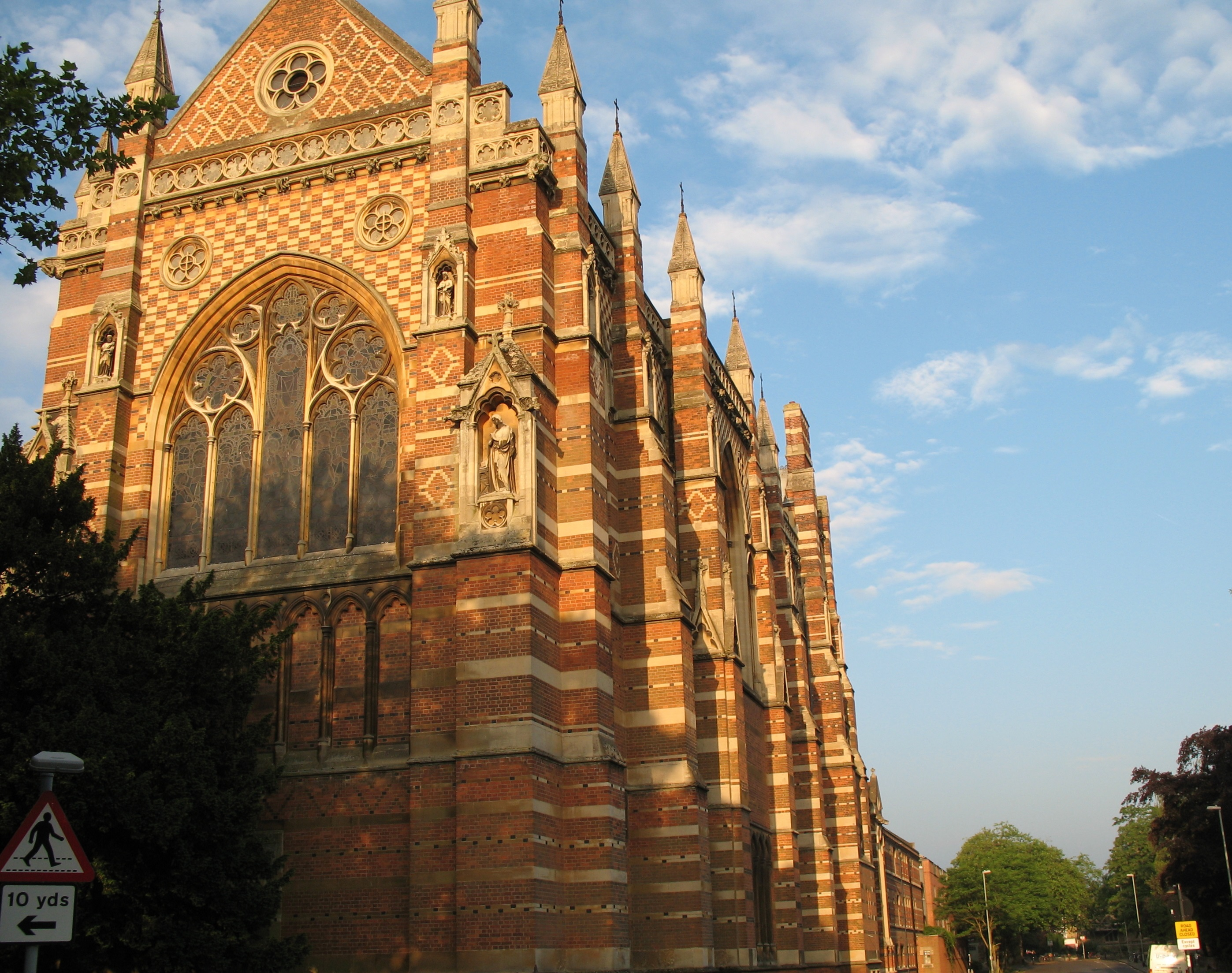
Keble College Chapel from Parks Road, at the junction with Keble Road.

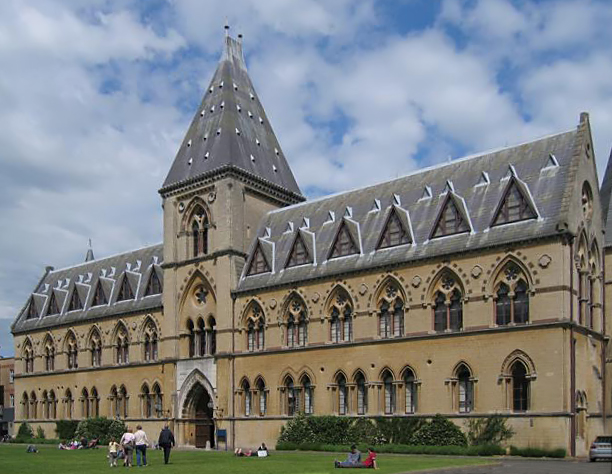
The front of the Oxford University Museum of Natural History on Parks Road.

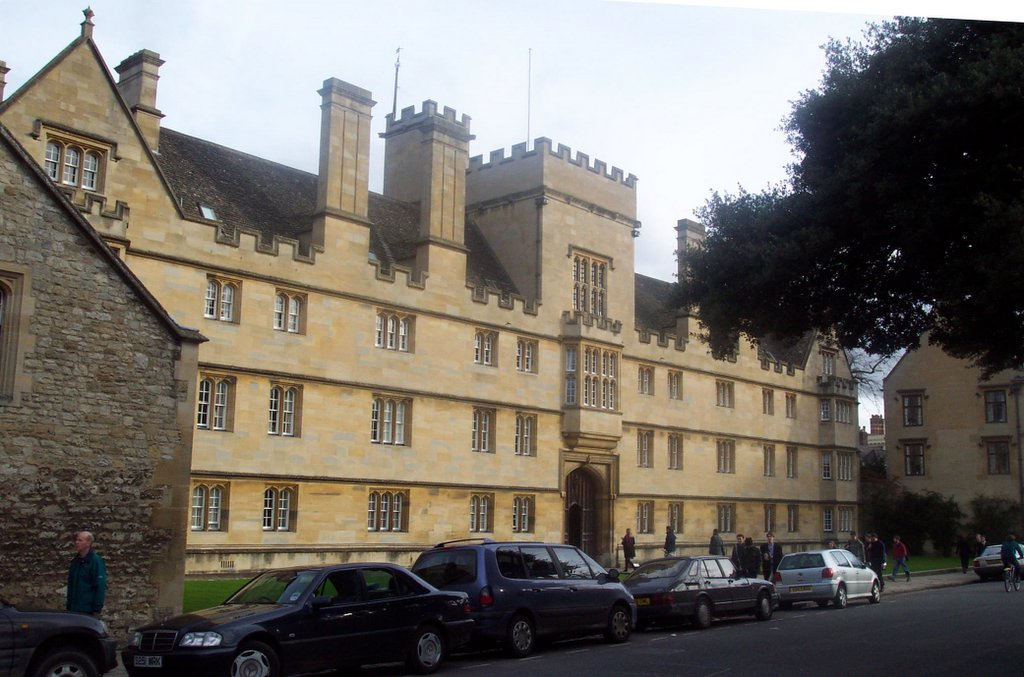
Wadham College main entrance on Parks Road.

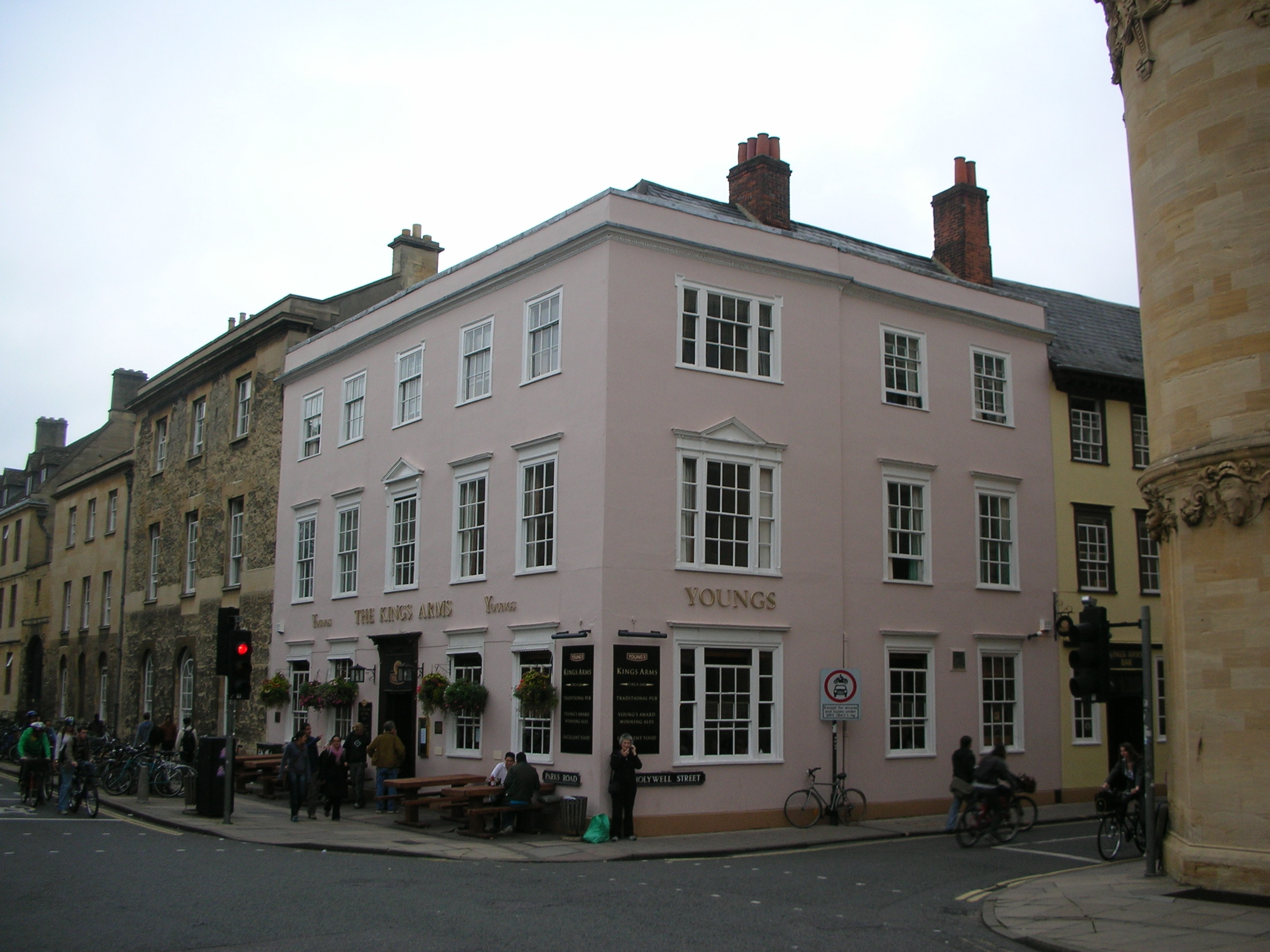
The King's Arms at the southern end of Parks Road.

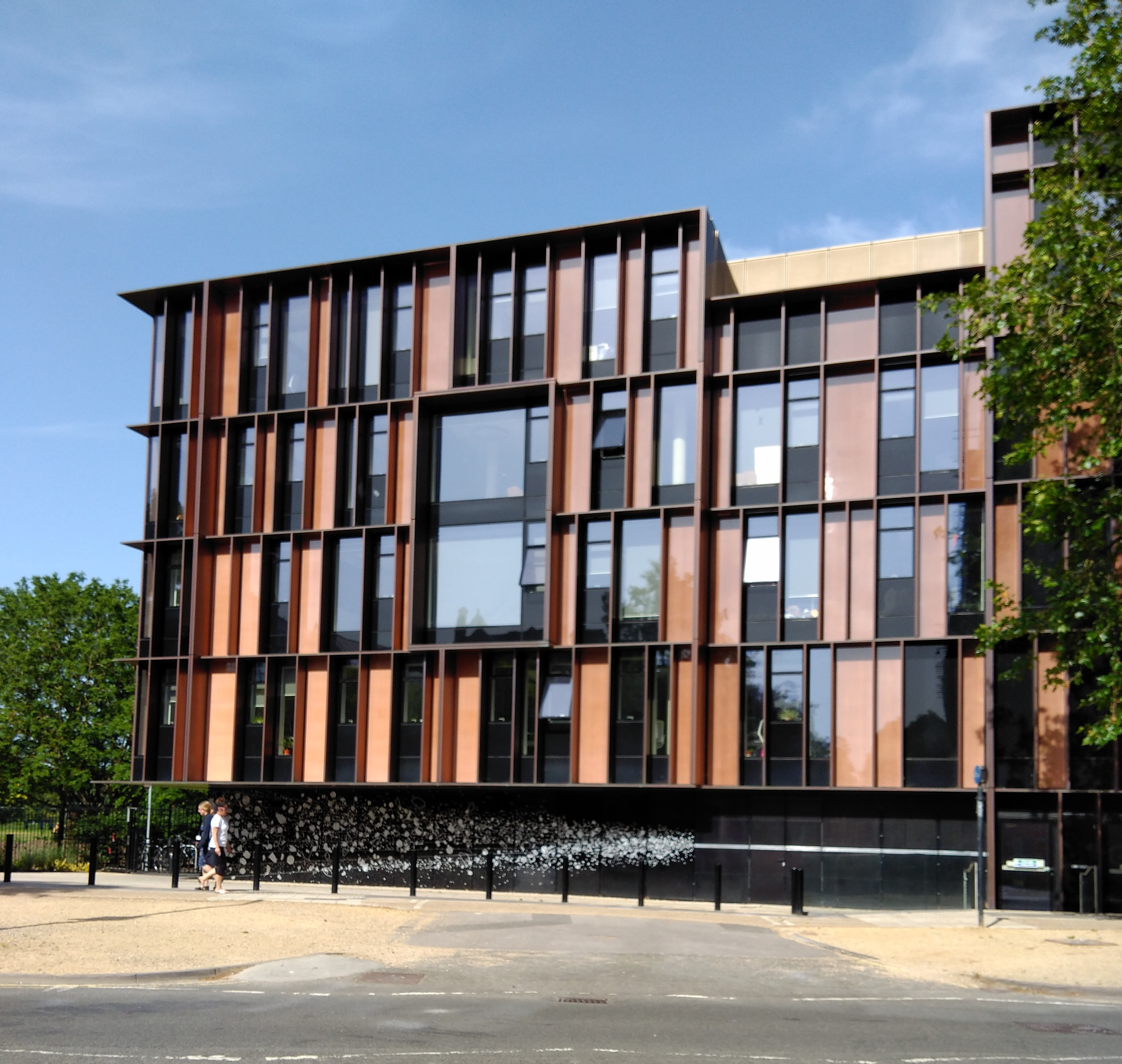
The Beecroft Building of the Oxford University Department of Physics, opened in 2018.
