= Turf Tavern =

Pub in Oxford, England

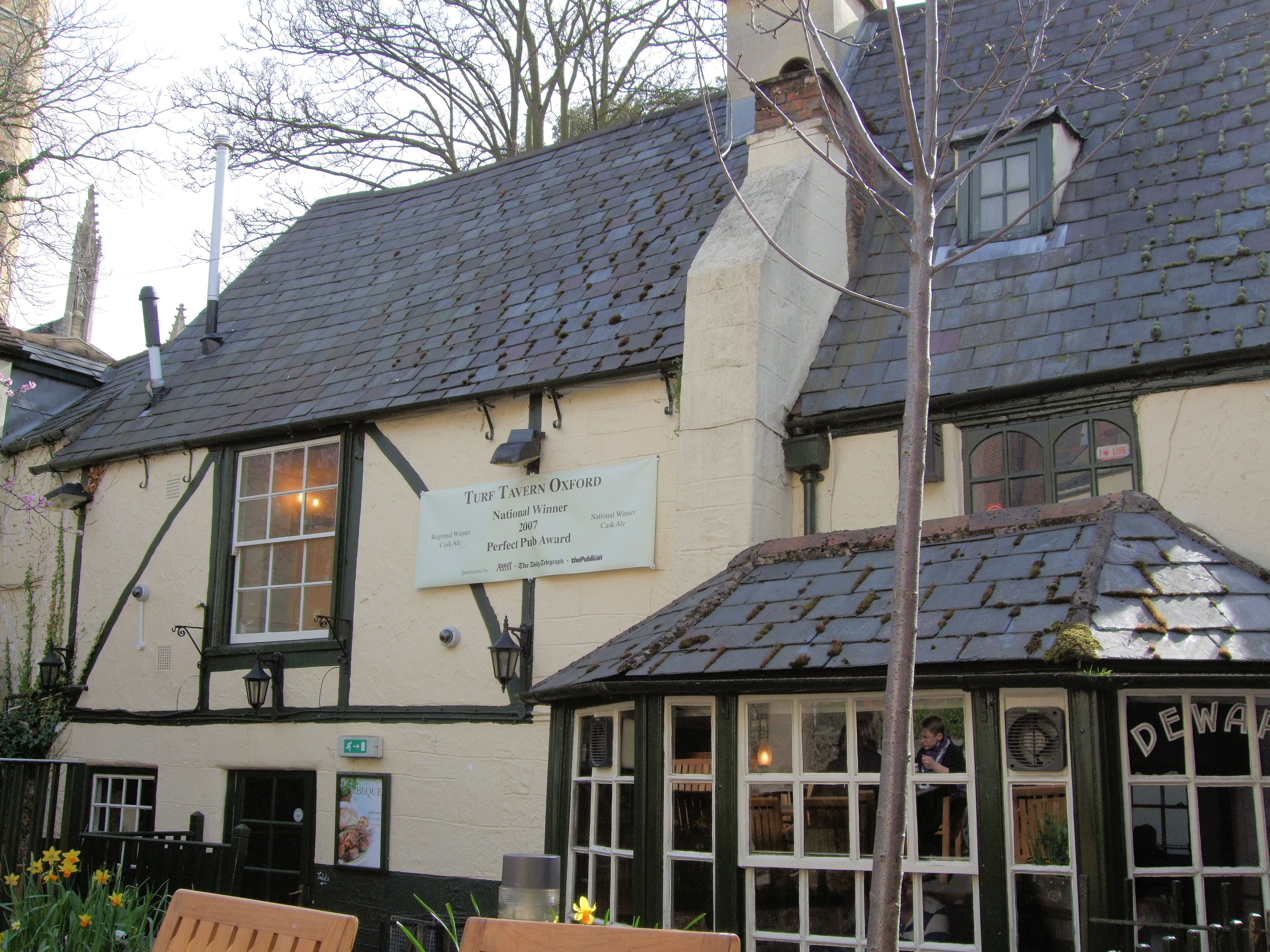
- Turf Tavern located in Oxford, England.

- Location within Oxford city centre

General information
- Coordinates: 51°45′17″N 1°15′11″W
- Owner: Greene King

Website
- Turf Tavern website

The Turf Tavern is a pub in central Oxford, England. It first opened around the end of 18th century as a public house named The Spotted Cow.

The pub is frequented primarily by students. It is located at the end of a narrow winding alley, St Helens Passage (originally Hell Passage), between Holywell Street and New College Lane, near the Bridge of Sighs. Running along one side of the pub is one of the remaining sections of the old Oxford city wall. Due to the illegal activities of many of its original patrons, the Turf sprang up in an area just outside the city wall in order to escape the jurisdiction of the governing bodies of the local colleges.

== Historical significance ==
The Turf Tavern incorrectly advertises itself as the site where future Australian Prime Minister Bob Hawke set a Guinness Record for consuming a yard glass of ale in 1963. As a result the pub has become the site of pilgrimage for Australian tourists and students, with politicians unsuccessfully advocating for a heritage plaque to recognize its historical significance. A historian has shown that the pub is not connected to the record set by Hawke, with Hawke himself offering two possible alternative locations (The Dog House Inn near Abingdon and the Hall at University College) where he supposedly set a beer record in 1954 or 1955. Numerous journalists have also reported that the Turf Tavern is not the location where Hawke set his record.

Other public figures who are said to have dined or drunk at the tavern include Richard Burton, Elizabeth Taylor, Tony Blair, CS Lewis, Stephen Hawking and Margaret Thatcher. It also served as a hangout for the cast and crew of the Harry Potter movies while the nearby colleges were used as locations throughout the filming of the series. The Turf Tavern also claims to be the location where future American president Bill Clinton, while a student at University College, Oxford as a Rhodes Scholar, famously smoked "but did not inhale" marijuana.

It was also featured in the ITV TV Series Inspector Morse aired between 1987 and 2000.
