= Weston Library =

Library in Oxford, England

Coordinates: 51.755°N 1.255°W

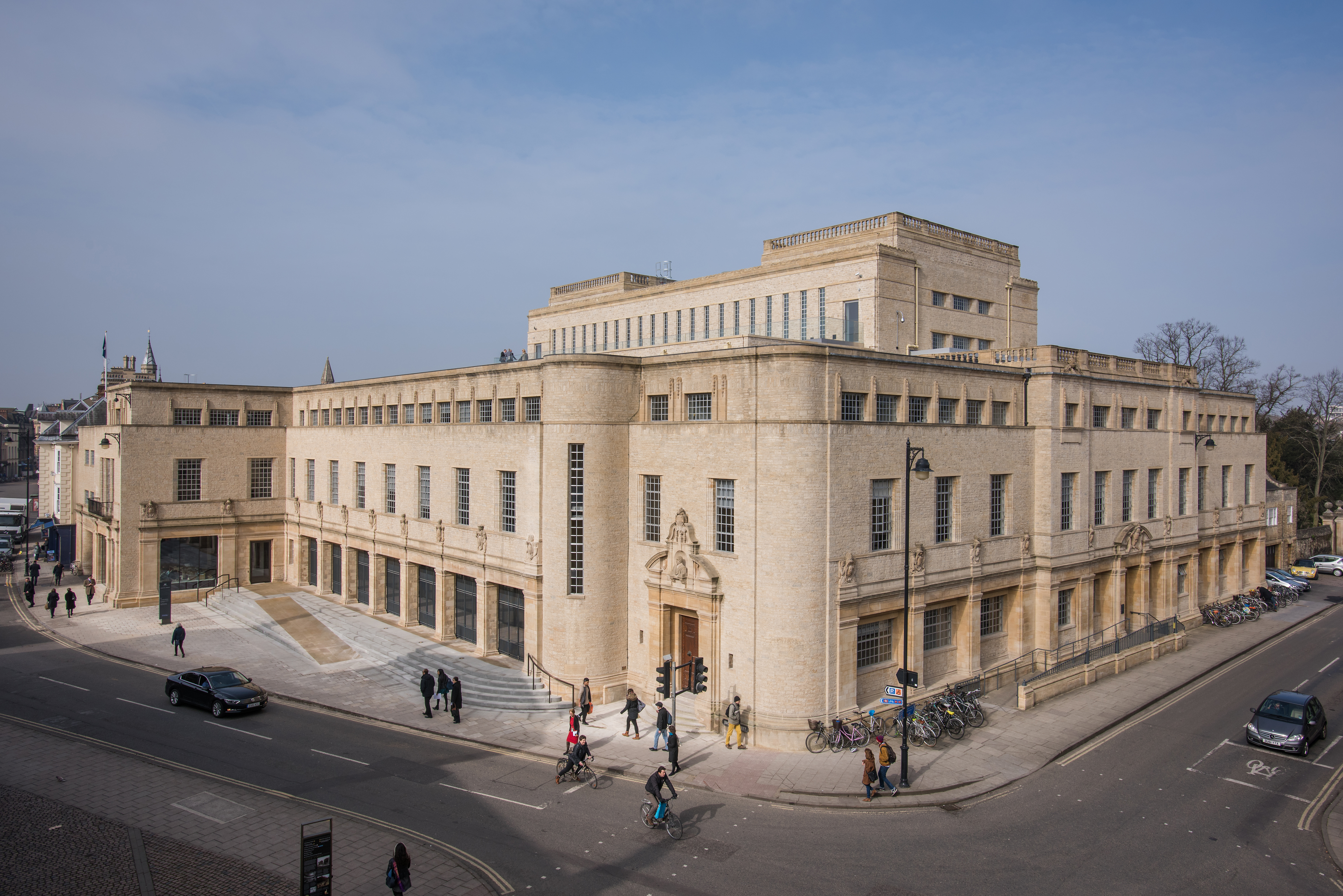
- View of the library building.
- Location: Broad Street, Oxford, United Kingdom
- Type: Academic library
- Established: 2015

Collection
- Items collected: Books, journals, newspapers, magazines, sound and music recordings, maps, prints, drawings and manuscripts

Access and use
- Access requirements: By reader card for the library itself. The Blackwell Hall, two exhibition rooms, a gift shop, and cafe are open to the public.
- Members: Students and fellows of University of Oxford

Other information
- Website: bodleian.ox.ac.uk/weston

The Weston Library is part of the Bodleian Library, the main research library of the University of Oxford, reopened within the former New Bodleian Library building on the corner of Broad Street and Parks Road in central Oxford, England.

== History ==
From 1937 to 1940, Sir Giles Gilbert Scott worked on the New Bodleian Library, in Broad Street, Oxford. It is not generally considered his finest work. Needing to provide storage for millions of books without building higher than the surrounding structures, Scott devised a construction going deep into the earth, behind two elevations no higher than those around them. His biographer A. S. G. Butler commented, "In an attempt to be polite to these – which vary from late Gothic to Victorian Tudor – Scott produced a not very impressive neo-Jacobean design". A later biographer, Gavin Stamp, praises the considerable technical achievement of keeping the building low in scale by building underground, but agrees that aesthetically the building is not among Scott's most successful designs. Nikolaus Pevsner dismisses it as "neither one thing nor the other".

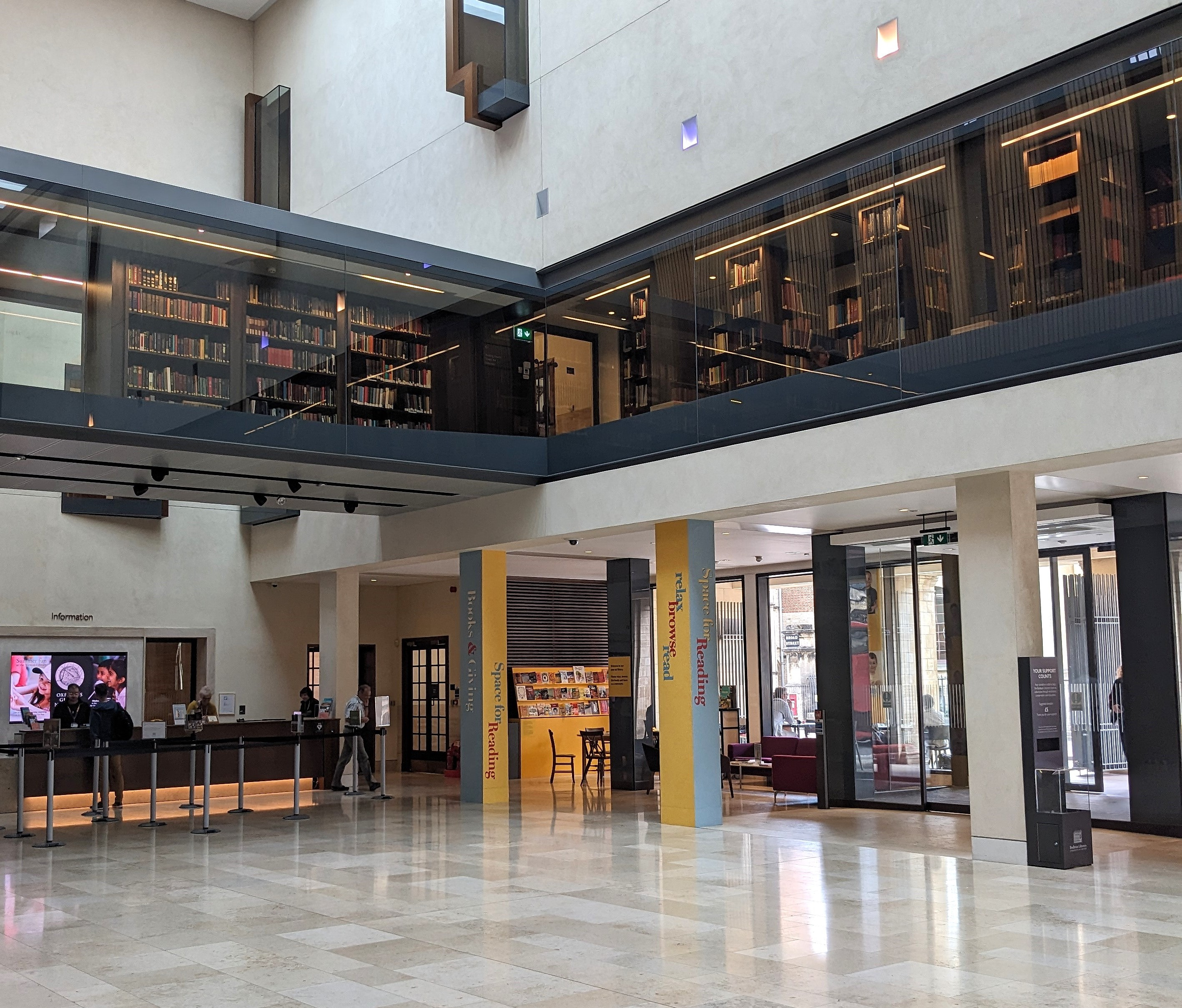
Blackwell Hall

The building was constructed of Bladon stone with Clipsham dressings and was opened by King George VI. The Rockefeller Foundation donated 60% of the £1 million cost for the new library building. It included administrative and reading rooms, together with an 11-storey bookstack, three of which are underground. This was connected with the original Bodleian Library underground by a conveyor belt system for books. It is still possible to walk underground between the Radcliffe Camera and the new library building.

In the early 21st century, the building was rebuilt internally to the design of WilkinsonEyre behind its original façade to provide improved storage facilities for rare and fragile material, as well as better facilities for readers and visitors. It reopened to readers as the Weston Library on 21 March 2015. Richard Ovenden, as Bodley's Librarian, awarded the Bodley Medal to Professor Stephen Hawking and Sir David Attenborough as part of the official opening ceremony.

The transformed library has been generally well-received as reported by The Independent newspaper.

In July 2016, the building was shortlisted for the Stirling Prize for excellence in architecture.

== Gallery ==
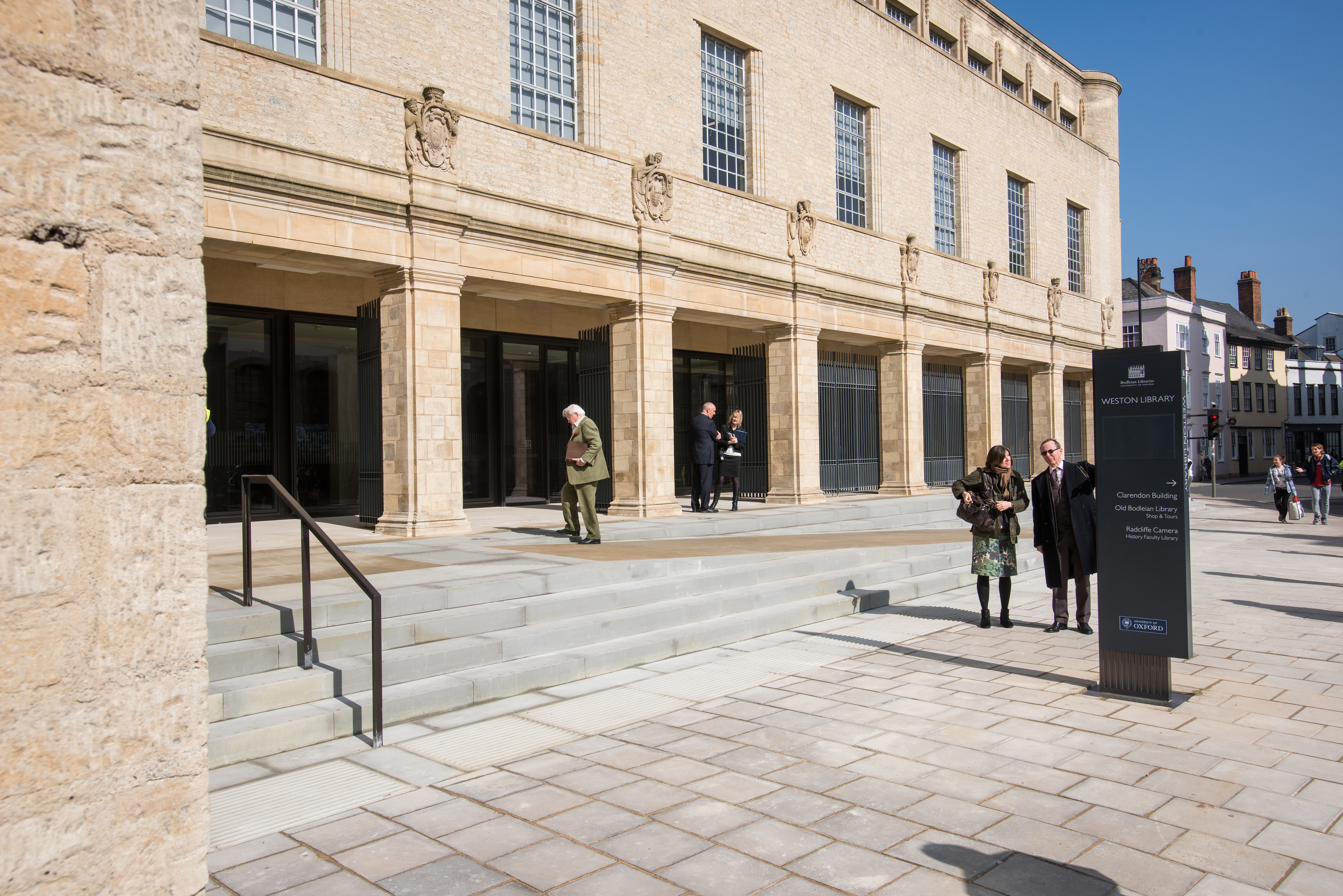
The Weston Library main entrance on Broad Street

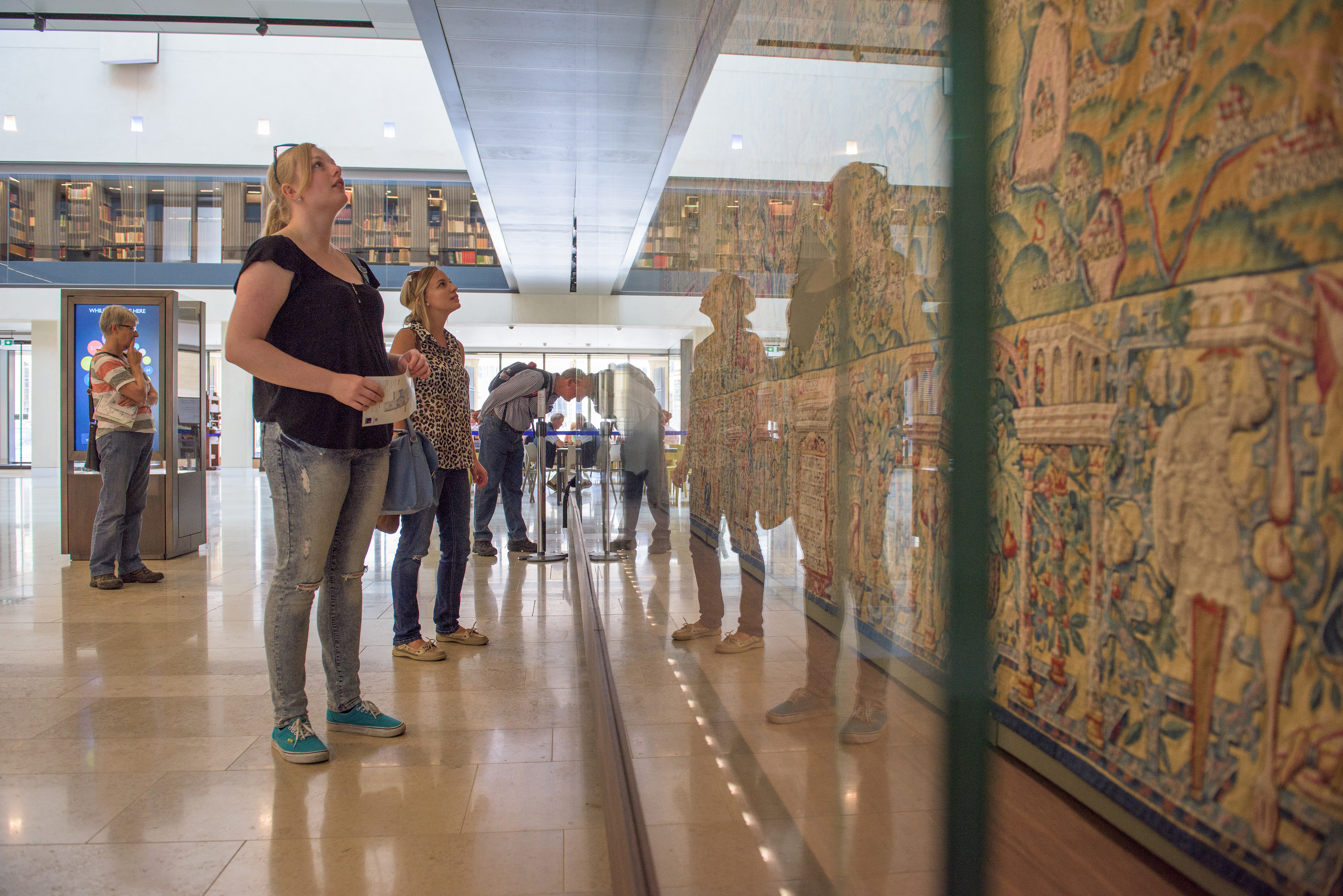
The Blackwell Hall inside the library

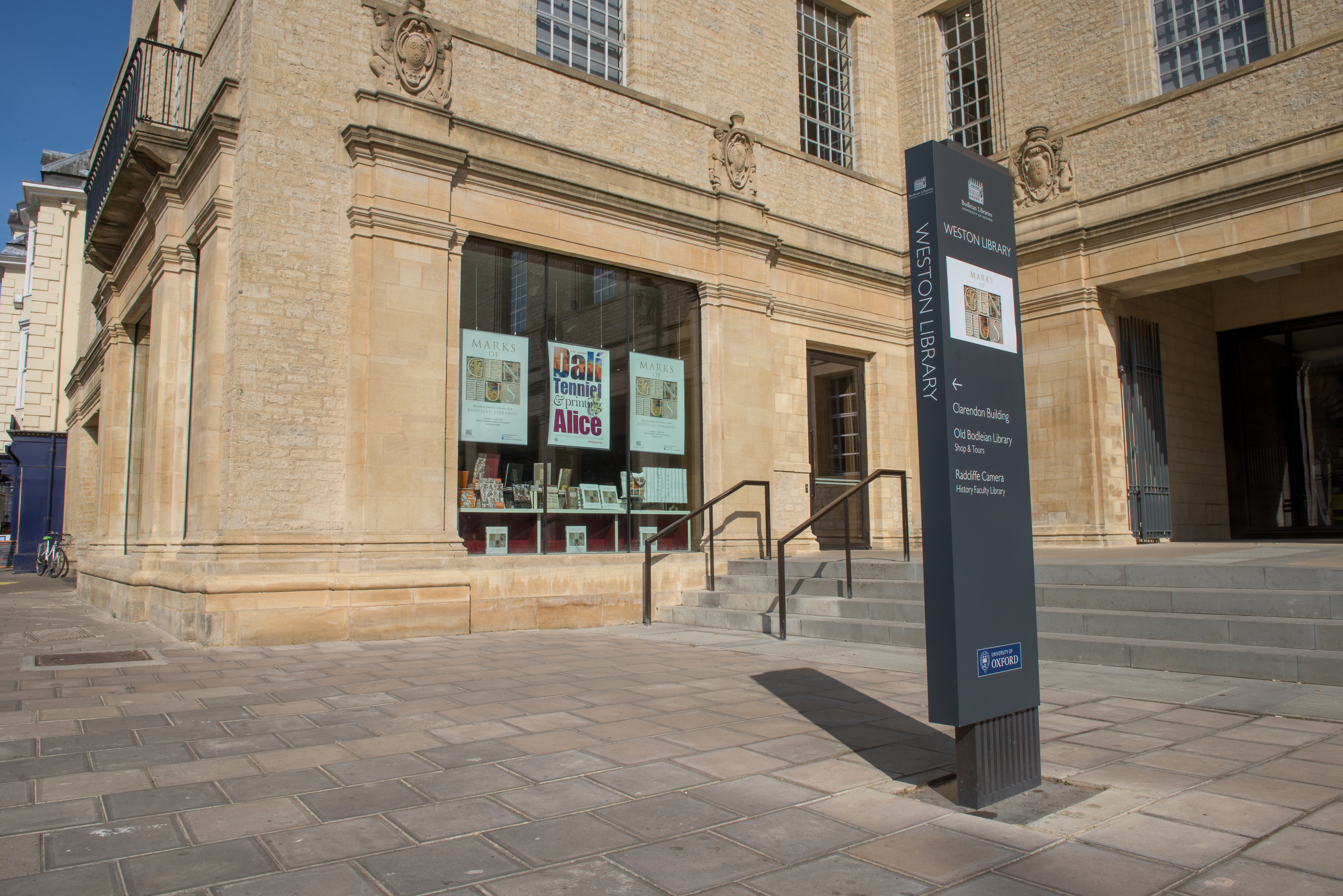
External view of the gift shop

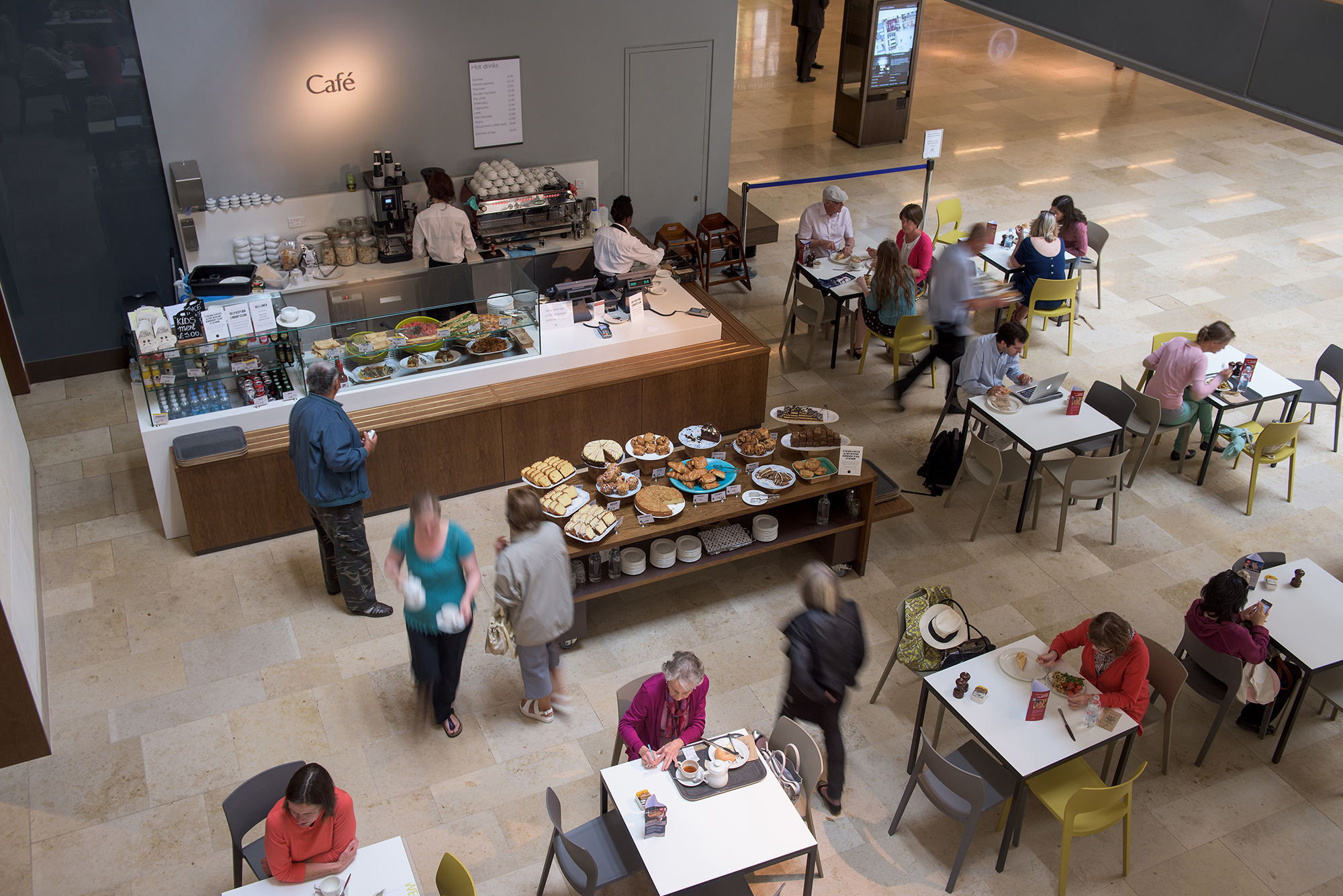
View of the cafe

== See also ==
- Bodleian Library
