= Joseph Thornton (bookseller) =

English bookseller in Oxford (1808–1891)

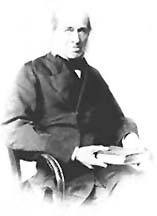
- Portrait photograph of Thornton
- Born: 28 September 1808; Billericay, Essex, England
- Died: 2 June 1891 (aged 82); Oxford, England
- Occupation: Bookseller
- Years active: 1835 onwards
- Known for: Thornton's Bookshop, Oxford's oldest bookshop

Joseph Thornton (28 September 1808 – 2 June 1891) was a bookseller who founded Thornton's Bookshop in 1835 in Oxford, England, the oldest university bookshop in the city.

Joseph Thornton was born in Billericay, Essex, England, the son of John Thornton (1776–1841) and Mary (nee Mabbs, 1777–1852).

Thornton's first bookshop was in Magdalen Street, Oxford, and opened in 1835. He then moved to 51 High Street in 1840. He moved back to Magdalen Street in 1853 and to 10 Broad Street in 1863. In 1870, he moved to 11 Broad Street, where the shop remained as a family firm for many years, finally closing in 2002, at the time Oxford's oldest bookshop.

Joseph Thornton died in Oxford and is buried there in St Sepulchre's Cemetery, with his second wife and daughter. His son John Henry Thornton (1845–1924) is buried in the same cemetery with his wife and sister-in-law. His other son was James Thornton (1848–1894), publisher in High street. After James' death the two firms merged. Thornton's Bookshop was a family concern for several generations after Joseph Thornton's death.
