= Thornton's Bookshop =

Bookshop in Oxford, England

Coordinates: 51.754218°N 1.257658°W

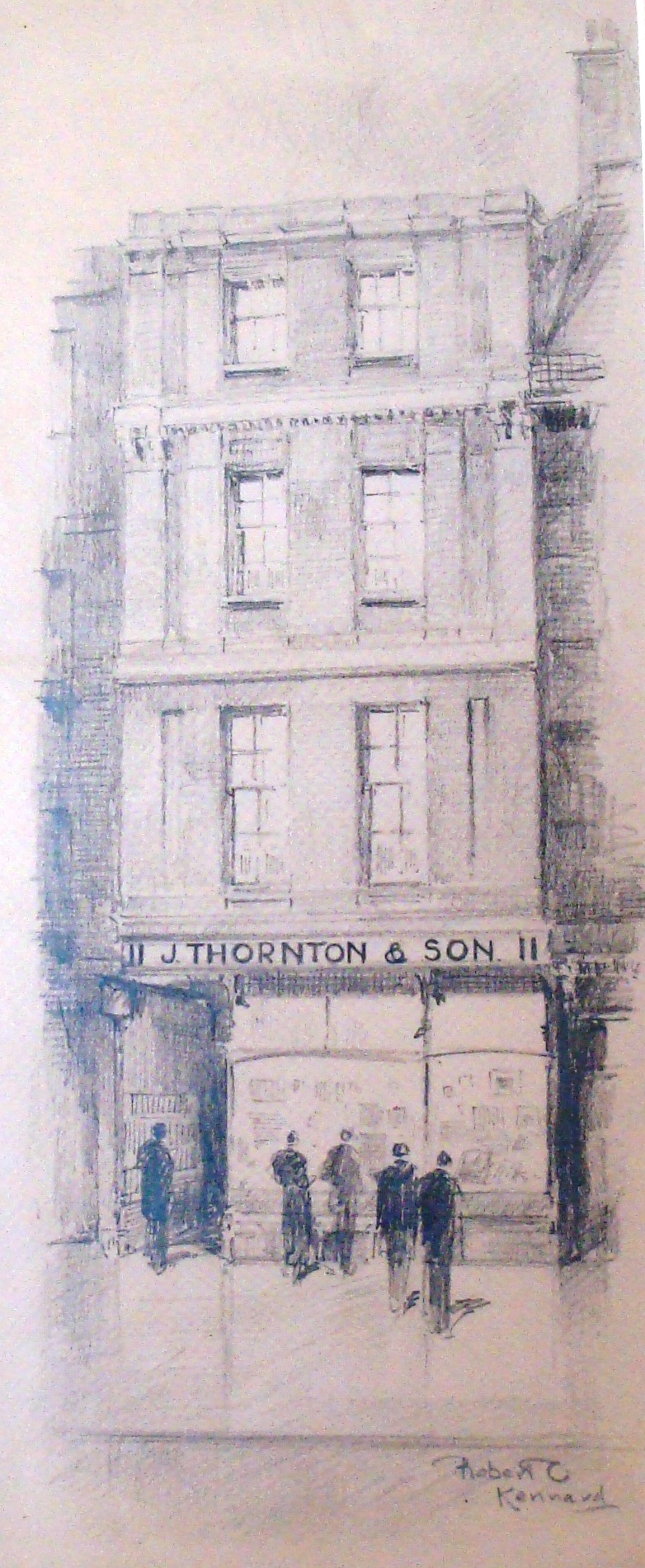
- Drawing by Robert Kennard in 1930
- Company type: Retail bookshop
- Industry: Book seller
- Founded: 1835
- Founder: Joseph Thornton (1808–1891)
- Defunct: 2002
- Headquarters: 11 Broad Street, Oxford, England

Thornton's Bookshop (locally known as Thornton's) was the oldest university bookshop in Oxford, England. It was founded in 1835 by Joseph Thornton (1808–1891) in Magdalen Street.

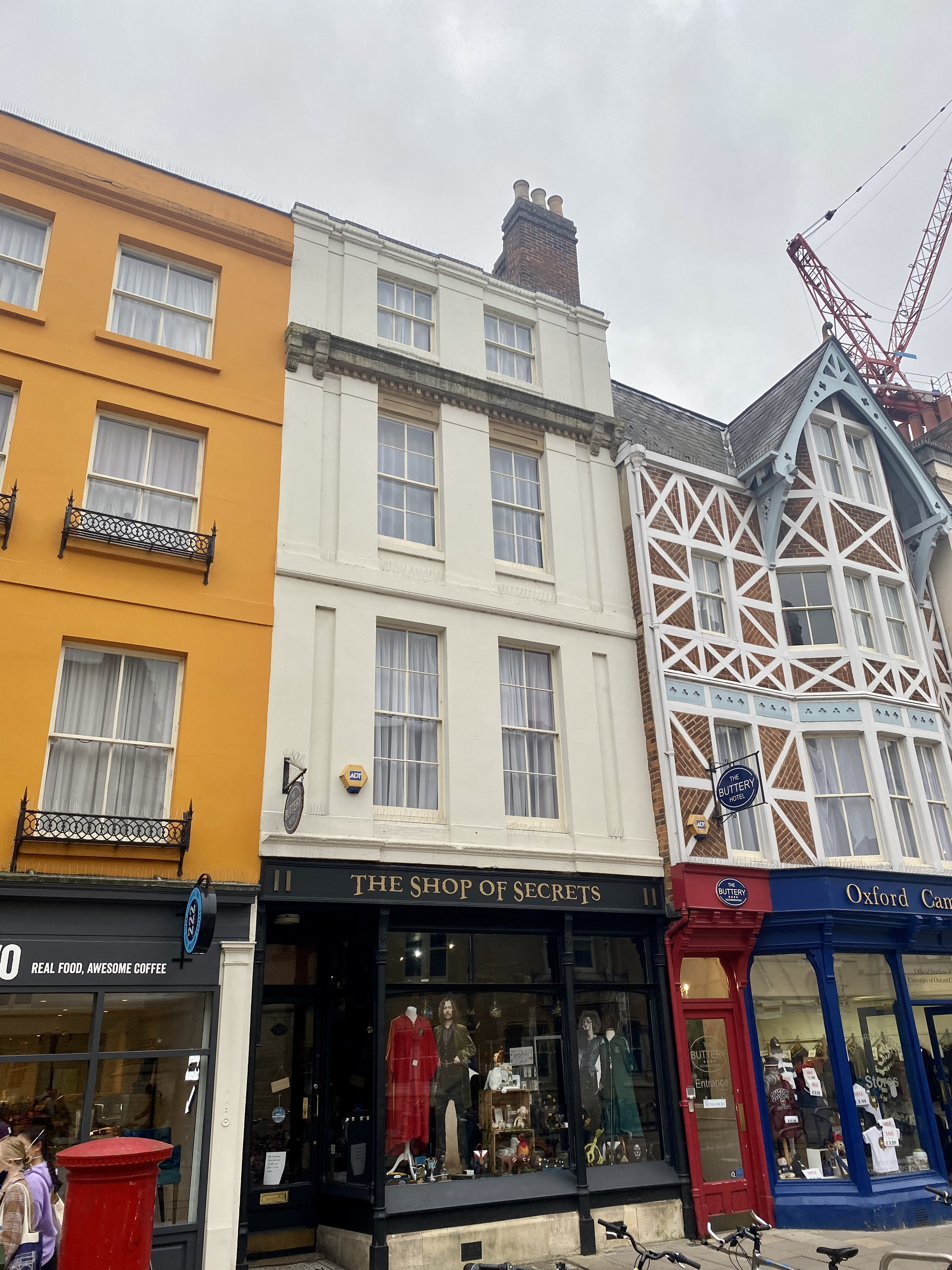
11 Broad Street, the site of Thornton's Bookshop, in 2021

From 1870, the bookshop was located at 11 Broad Street (opposite Balliol College), continued as a family business by five generations of the Thornton family and from 1983 by the Meeuws family, but closed at the end of 2002. The shop premises on Broad Street were frequently used for television adaptations like the final Inspector Morse episode, The Remorseful Day.

== See also ==
- Book trade in the United Kingdom
