= Broad Street, Oxford =

Street in central Oxford, England

Coordinates: 51°45′16″N 1°15′24″W

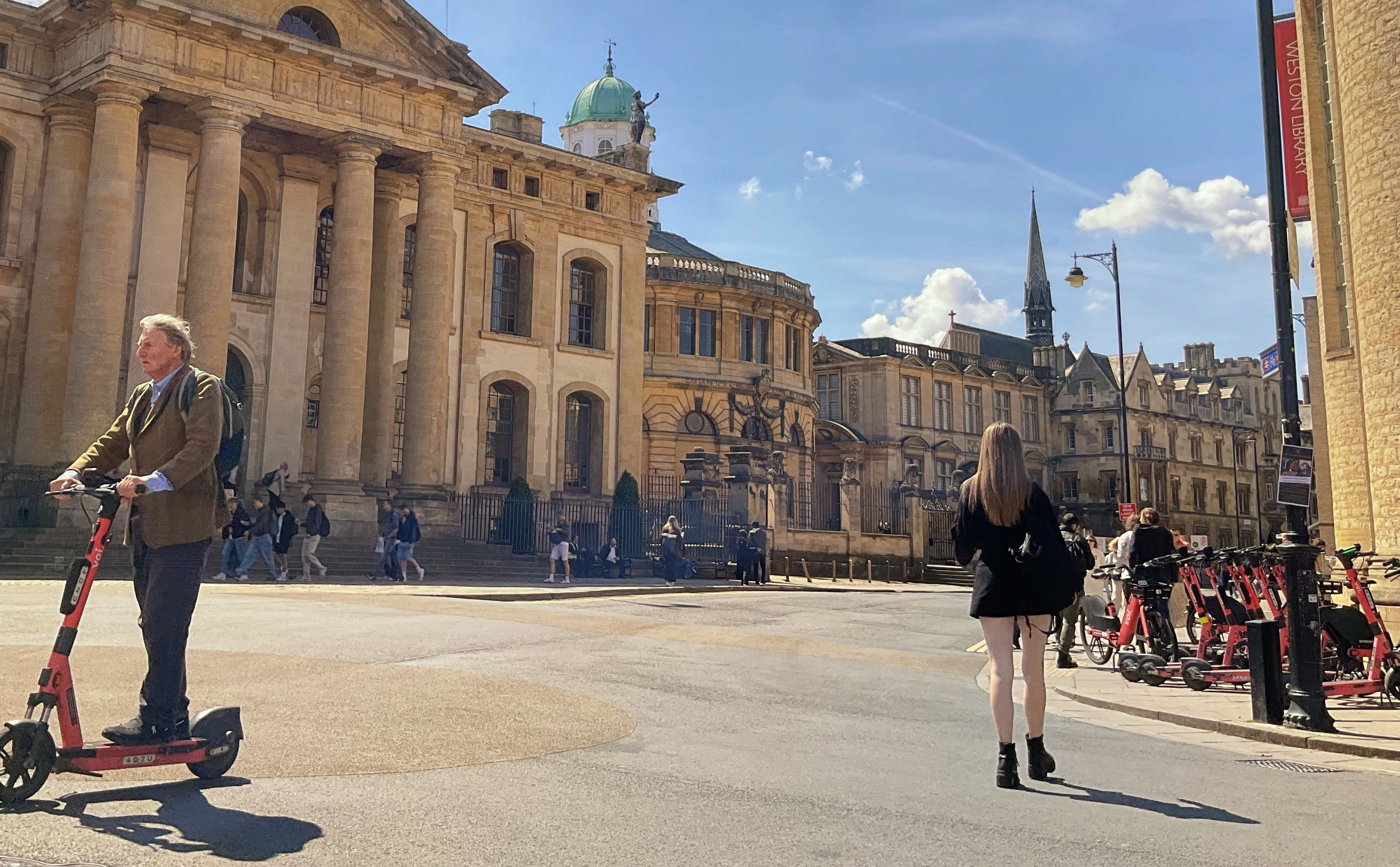
Broad Street, Oxford

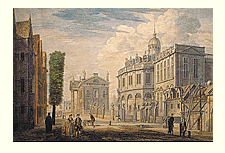
Historical view of Broad Street looking east towards (left to right) the Clarendon Building, and the Sheldonian Theatre and the Old Ashmolean Building.

Broad Street is a wide street in central Oxford, England, just north of the former Oxford city wall. The street is known for its bookshops, including the original Blackwell's bookshop at number 50, located here due to the University of Oxford. Among residents, the street is traditionally known as The Broad. On the street is a memorial paving for the Oxford Martyrs.

== Location ==
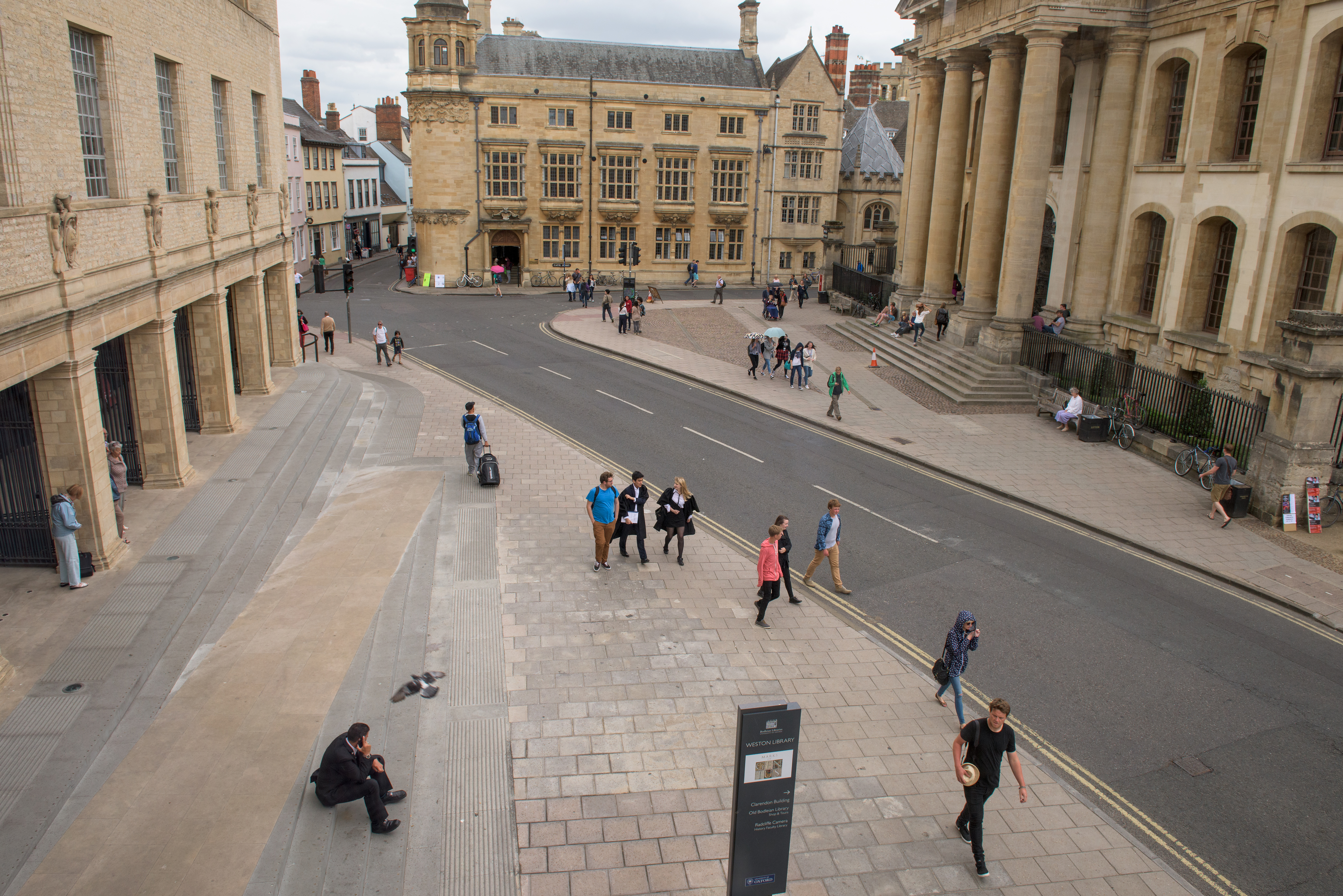
The eastern part of Broad Street, with the Weston Library on the left and Clarendon Building on the right. The building ahead is the former Indian Institute in Catte Street.

Three colleges of the University are located on Broad Street: Balliol College, Trinity College, and Exeter College, whose front entrance is in the adjoining Turl Street. The Museum of the History of Science (in the original Ashmolean Museum building), the Clarendon Building, the Sheldonian Theatre and the Weston Library (renamed in 2015; part of the Bodleian Library, the main University library in Oxford) are important historical Oxford University buildings at the eastern end of the street. These buildings form the de facto centre of the University, since most academic buildings in the centre of Oxford are owned by individual (and autonomous) colleges rather than the University itself.

To the west, the street becomes George Street. The junction with George Street is a crossroads with Magdalen Street to the north and Cornmarket Street to the south. To the east, the street becomes Holywell Street. The junction with Holywell Street is another crossroads, with Parks Road to the north and Catte Street to the south. The Indian Institute (now The James Martin 21st Century School), designed by Basil Champneys, is on the corner of Catte Street and Holywell Street, but faces Broad Street and visually forms its end.

== History ==
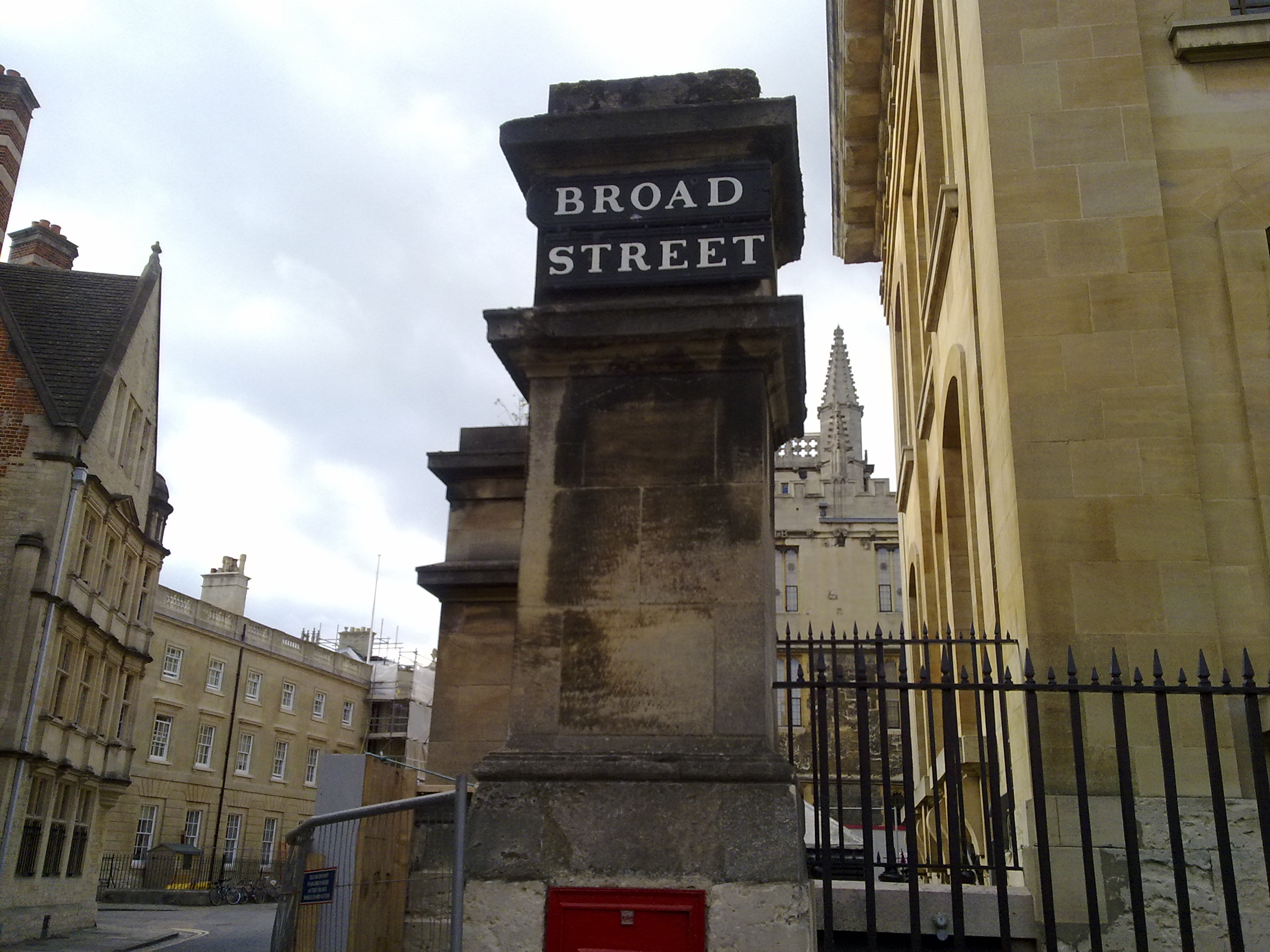
Pillar outside the Clarendon building at the junction of Broad Street and Catte Street

The cross of granite setts marking the location of the martyrs' execution at the western end of Broad Street.

The street developed alongside the town ditch (known as Canditch) in front of the city wall, which was built in AD 911. It is a wide street, formerly called Horsemonger Street because it was Oxford's horse market. The street's one remaining pub, a 16th or 17th-century timber-framed building next to Blackwell's bookshop, is appropriately called the White Horse.

On Broad Street, the Protestant Oxford Martyrs, Hugh Latimer and Nicholas Ridley (16 October 1555), and later Thomas Cranmer (21 March 1556), were burnt at the stake just outside the city wall. A cross of granite setts in the road opposite Balliol College marks the location. Nearby in St Giles', the events are commemorated with a Gothic Revival stone monument, the Martyrs' Memorial.

The city walls were rebuilt in local coral ragstone in 1226–40. By the 16th or 17th century, improved artillery had made the walls obsolete, so the city divided the town ditch on the south side of Broad Street into a row of burgage plots, on which buyers built houses and later shops. Most of the wall beside Broad Street was dismantled to reuse its stone, but one bastion survives behind number 6.

The Sheldonian Theatre, set back from Broad Street behind a stone wall, iron railings and stone pillars with a set of stone heads (traditionally Roman emperors), was built in 1664–68 to a design by Sir Christopher Wren for the University of Oxford.

The Old Ashmolean Building was built in 1683 to house Elias Ashmole's collection. It was the world's first museum to open to the public. In 1845, the Ashmolean Museum moved to Beaumont Street and the original Ashmolean building became offices for the Oxford English Dictionary. Since 1924, the building has housed the Museum of the History of Science.

The Clarendon Building was built 1711–15 to house the Oxford University Press's printing operations. It was designed by Nicholas Hawksmoor, a pupil of Wren.

The academic and physician Henry Acland (1815–1900) lived in the street at number 40 on the site of the Weston Library, part of Oxford University's Bodleian Library. His daughter Sarah Angelina Acland (1849–1930), a pioneer of colour photography, was born here.

== Shops ==
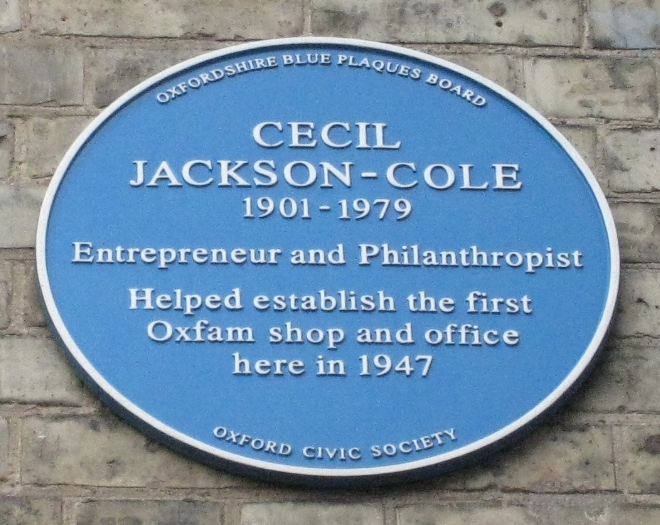
Blue plaque commemorating Cecil Jackson-Cole outside the first Oxfam shop

Boswells, the largest independent department store in Oxford, was established in 1738, and traded at the same location on the south side of Broad Street opposite Balliol College until its closure in 2020. Thornton's Bookshop, also on the south side of the street at number 11, was founded by Joseph Thornton (1808–91) in 1835 and closed at the end of 2002.

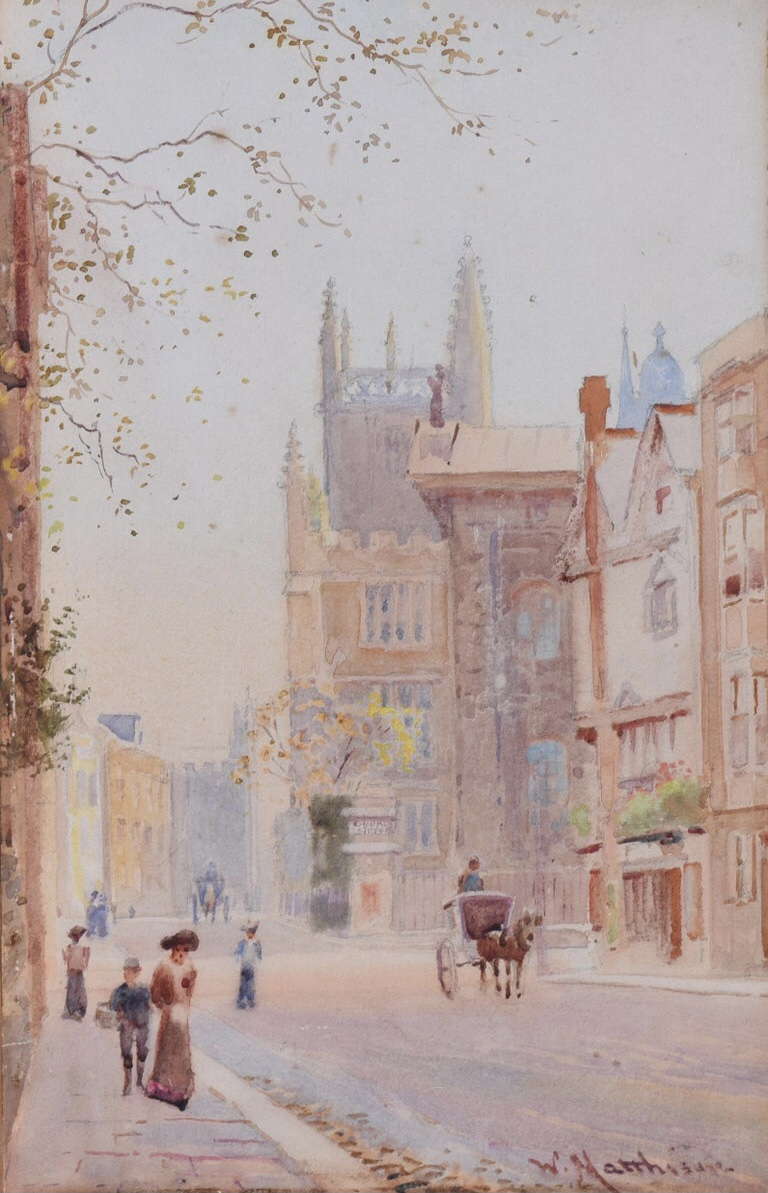
Broad Street, c. 1900

The pioneer photographer Henry Taunt (1842–1922) had a shop and studio at 9–10 Broad Street, moving here from Cornmarket Street in 1874. He also established a picture-framing business in Boxall's Yard, behind the premises. The lease expired in 1894 and he was forced to file for bankruptcy.

Blackwell's bookshop, on the north side of the street, was founded by Benjamin Henry Blackwell, the son of the first city librarian, in 1879. The shop was initially only 12 feet square, but quickly grew to include space upstairs, in the cellar, and neighbouring shops. It is now Oxford's leading bookshop, with other specialist branches elsewhere in Broad Street and Oxford.

During 1894–1923, the Holywell Press had its premises and bookshop at 29 Broad Street in the former Chapel of St Mary at Smith Gate. In 1923, the building became part of Hertford College and is now formally at the northern end of the adjoining Catte Street.

The first Oxfam charity shop and office were established by Cecil Jackson-Cole (1901–79) at 17 Broad Street in 1947. It is still an Oxfam shop, and in 2002 the Oxfordshire Blue Plaques Board unveiled a blue plaque on its outside wall.

== Bibliography ==
- Graham, Malcolm (1973). "2. His character". Henry Taunt of Oxford: A Victorian Photographer. Headington: Oxford Illustrated Press. ISBN 0-902280-14-7.
- Hudson, Giles (2012). "Chronology". Sarah Angelina Acland: First Lady of Colour Photography. Oxford: Bodleian Library, University of Oxford. p. 7. ISBN 978-1-85124-372-3.
- Sherwood, Jennifer; Pevsner, Nikolaus (1974). Oxfordshire. The Buildings of England. Harmondsworth: Penguin Books. pp. 71, 100, 134, 137, 138, 203, 254, 263, 312, 313. ISBN 0-14-071045-0.
- Tyack, Geoffrey (1998). Oxford An Architectural Guide. Oxford & New York: Oxford University Press. pp. 22, 35, 51, 54, 116, 117, 119, 126, 128, 151, 182, 210, 223, 228, 253, 256, 263, 292, 325. ISBN 0-19-817423-3.
