= Holywell Street, Oxford =

Street in central Oxford, England

Coordinates: 51.7549°N 1.2508°W

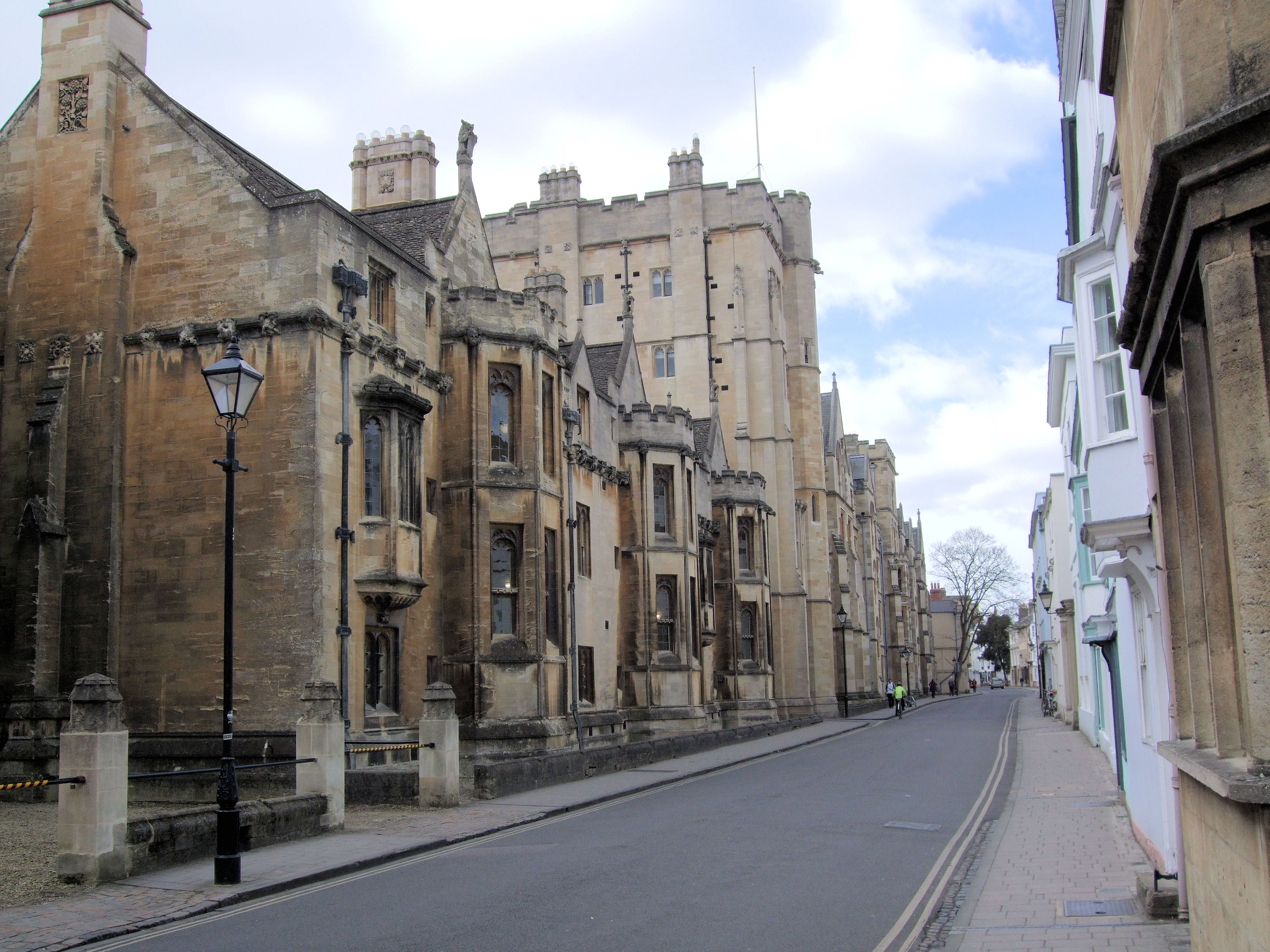
View from the east end of Holywell Street looking west with New College on the left.

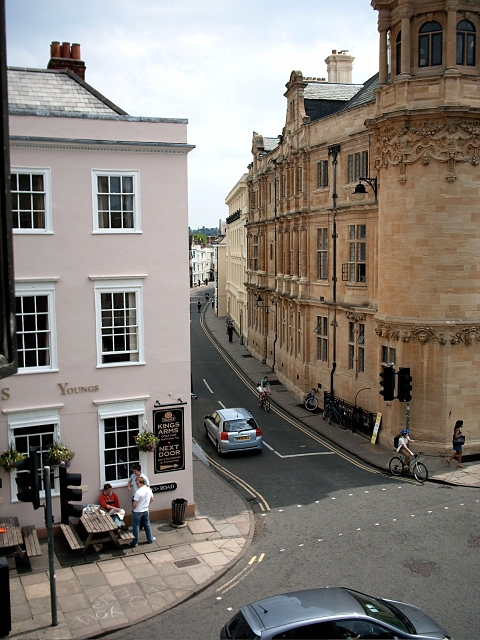
View from the west end of Holywell Street looking east with the King's Arms public house on the left and the Indian Institute on the right.

Holywell Street is a street in central Oxford, England. It runs east–west with Broad Street to the west and Longwall Street to the east. About halfway along, Mansfield Road adjoins to the north.

New College dominates the south side of the street. At the western end of the street is the King's Arms public house on the north corner, a favourite with Oxford University students, and the Indian Institute (now the home of The James Martin 21st Century School) to the south. On the north side is the Holywell Music Room, an historic chamber music venue built in 1742. Opposite a small cul-de-sac, Bath Place, leads via a small winding footpath to the historic Turf Tavern public house close to the old Oxford city wall. The wall remains, in places, and follows the course of Holywell Street to the south, partly through New College. The buildings on the corner of Holywell Street and Mansfield Road, along with the Alternative Tuck Shop, are owned by Harris Manchester College, and are used as student accommodation.

== People ==
The clockmakers Joseph Knibb (1640–1711) and John Knibb (1650–1722) traded from a tenement on the south side of Holywell Street that they rented from Merton College. Joseph moved to London in 1670 but John Knibb stayed in Oxford for the rest of his life and was Mayor of Oxford in 1697 and 1710.

The composer George Frideric Handel (1685–1759) performed at the Holywell Music Room.

Jane Burden (1839–1914), the muse of the Pre-Raphaelites and subject of many of their pictures, lived in a cottage in St Helen's Passage, at the back of Bath Place off Holywell Street. At the time of her birth, her father, Robert Burden, was a stableman and lived here with his wife, Ann (née Maizey, Jane's mother). The site is now marked with a blue plaque. At the time of Jane Burden's marriage to William Morris at St Michael's Church, Oxford, on 26 April 1859, her father was described as a groom in stables at 65 Holywell Street.

The academic and author J. R. R. Tolkien lived at 99 Holywell Street between 1950 and 1953, between residences in Manor Road and Sandfield Road, Headington.

== Gallery ==
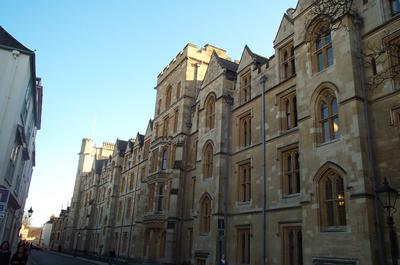
The front of New College on the south side of Holywell Street.

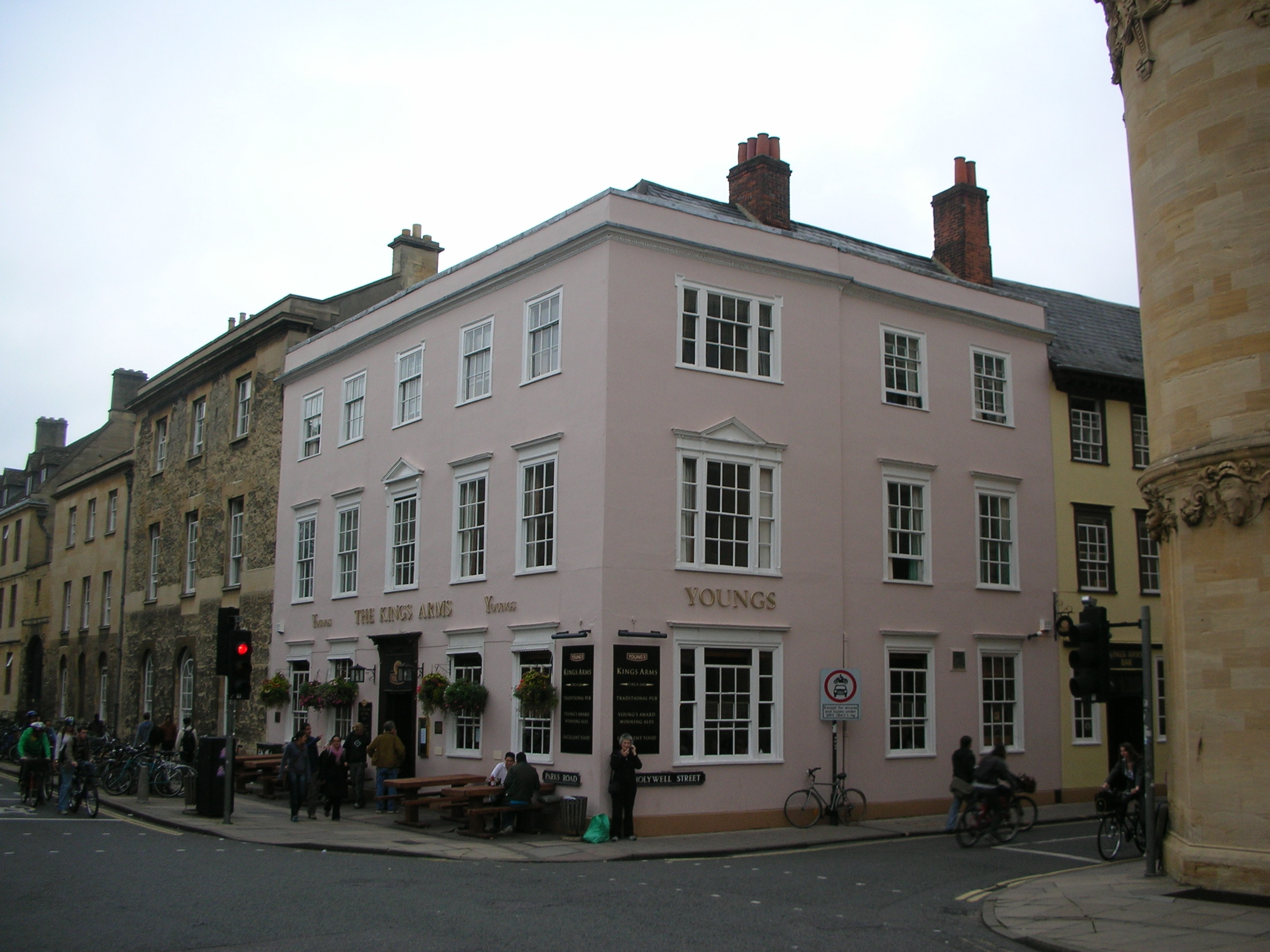
The King's Arms at the west end of Holywell Street.

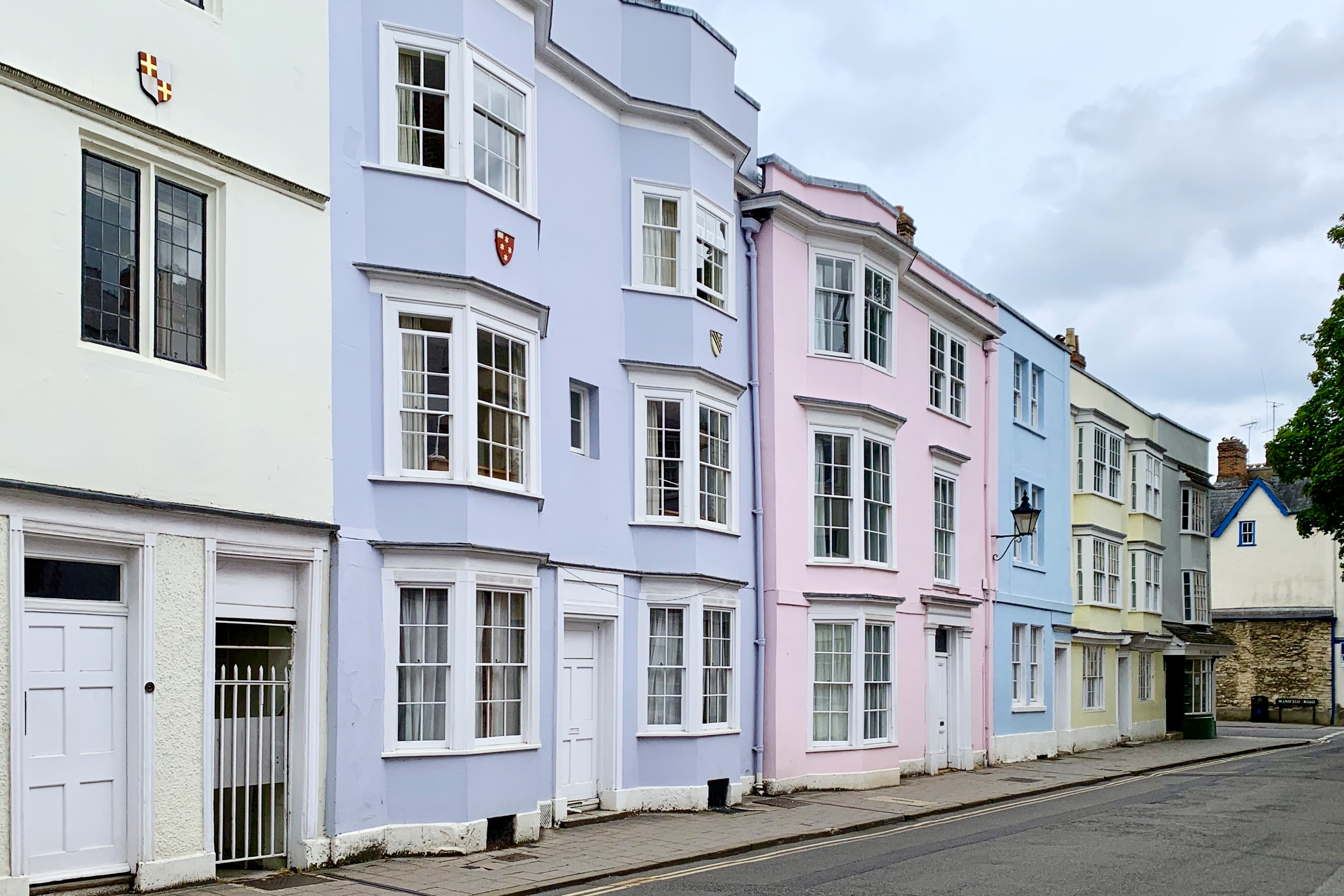
The front of Harris Manchester College on the north side of Holywell Street

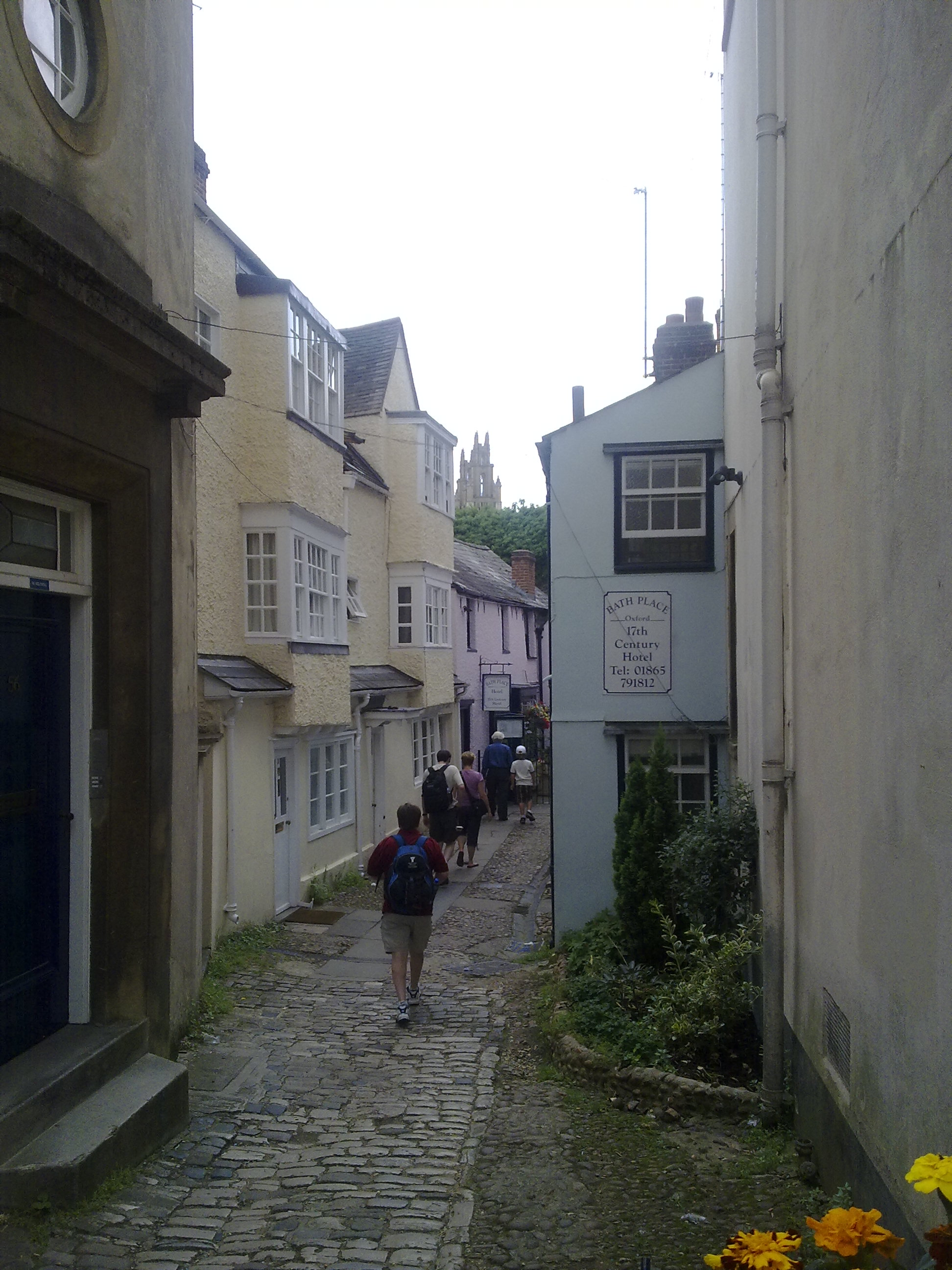
The entrance to Bath Place from Holywell Street, leading to the Turf Tavern.

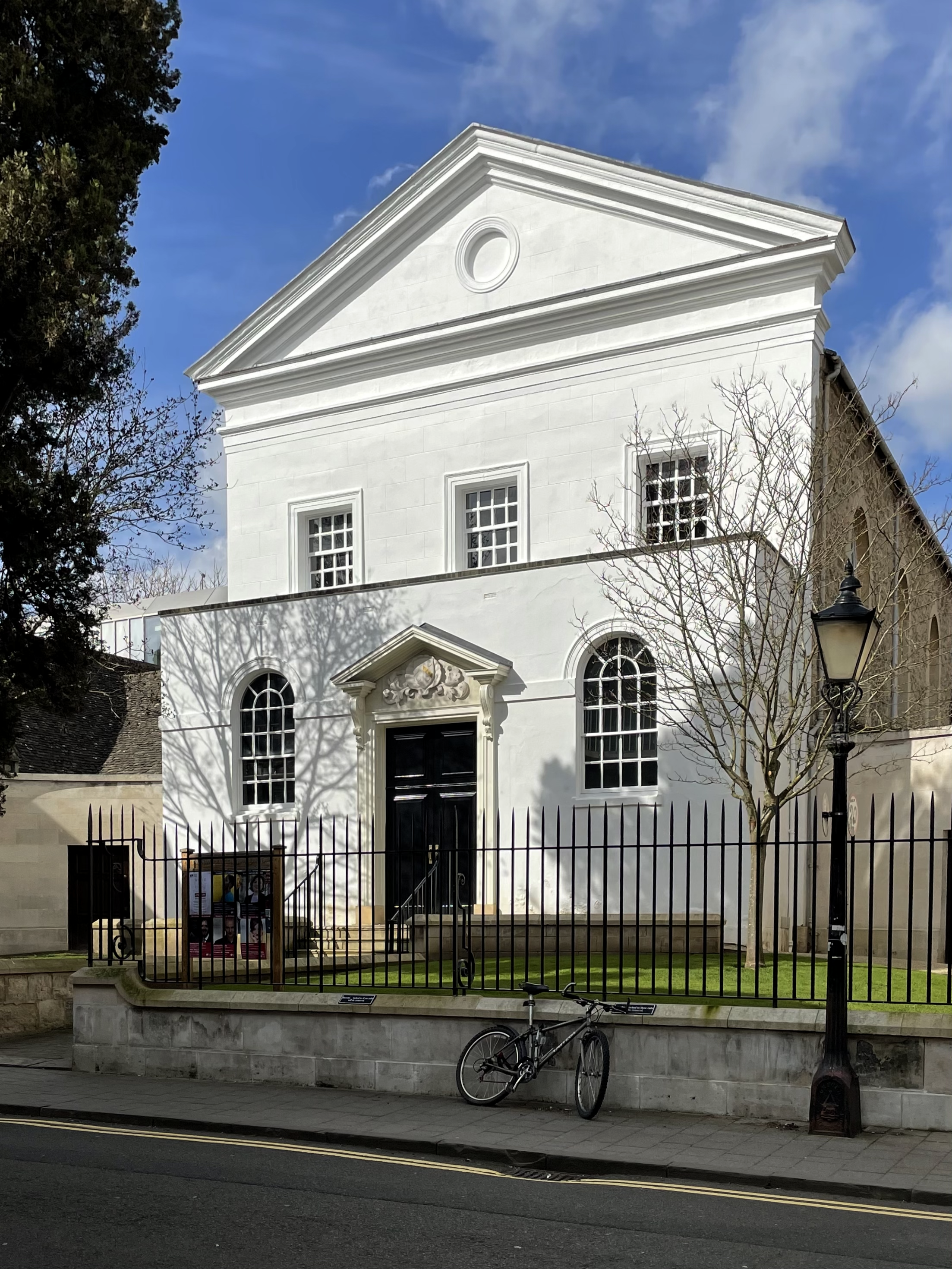
Holywell Music Room
