= Department of Engineering Science, University of Oxford =

University department in Oxford, England

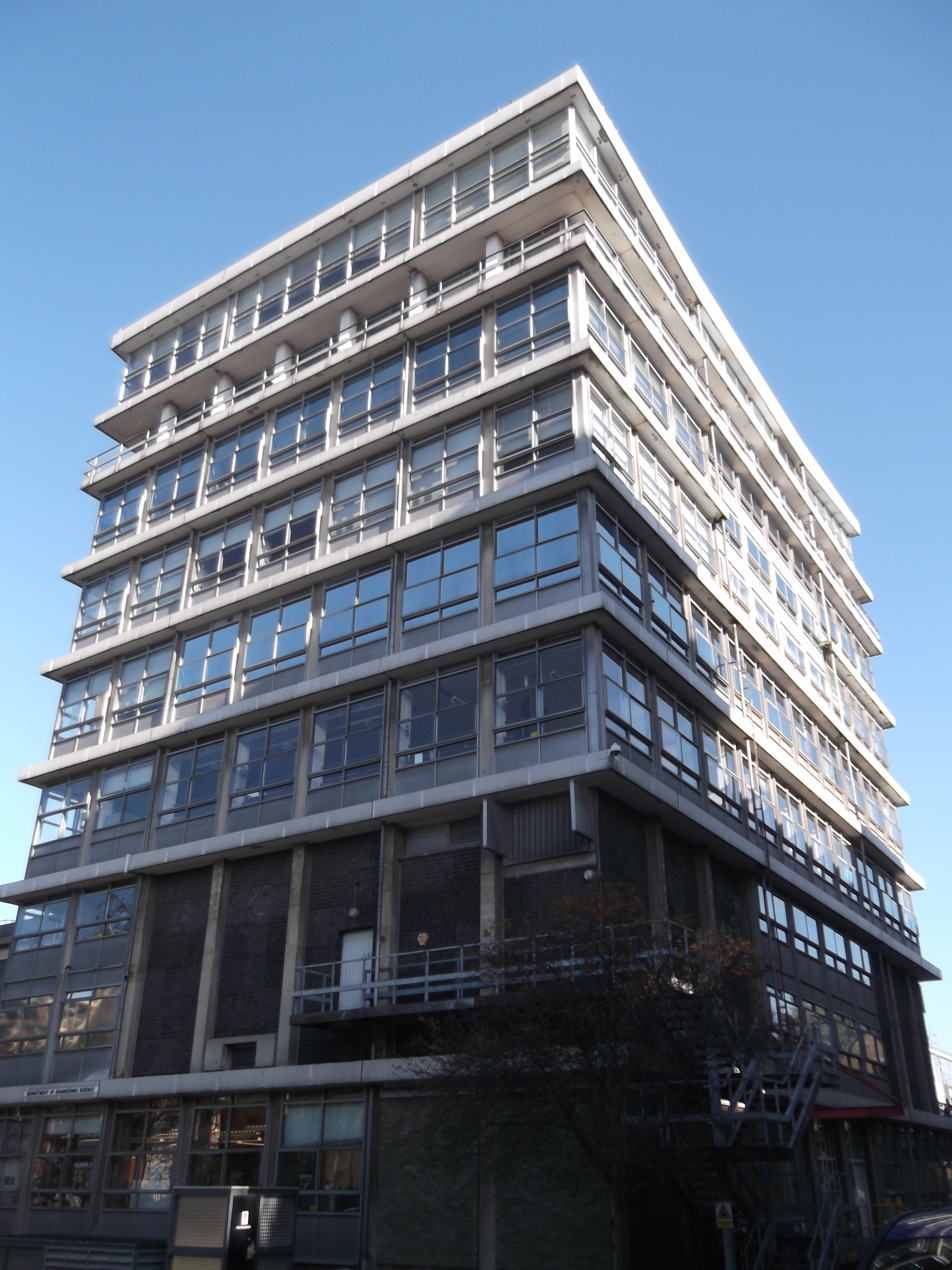
- Thom Building; Department of Engineering Science; University of Oxford
- Former names: The Honour School of Natural Science, University of Oxford
- Established: 1908
- Affiliations: University of Oxford; Mathematical, Physical and Life Sciences
- Head of Department: Prof. Clive Siviour (2024-present)
- Location: Oxford, United Kingdom; 51°45′35″N 1°15′34″W
- Campus: Keble Road Triangle
- Website: www.eng.ox.ac.uk

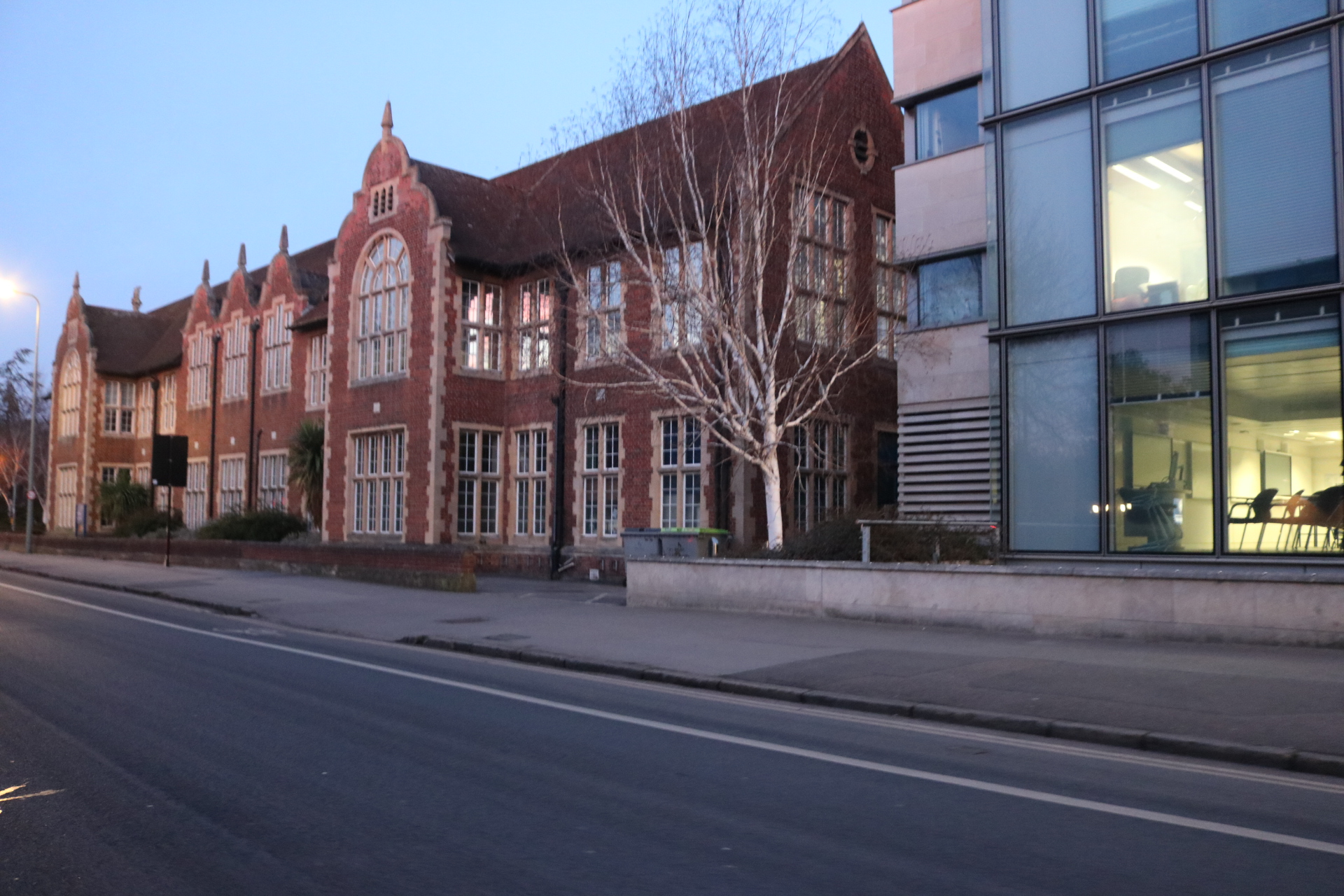
The Jenkin Building, as seen from Banbury Road in Oxford, England.

The Department of Engineering Science is an academic department at the Mathematical, Physical and Life Sciences Division at the University of Oxford in Oxford, England, United Kingdom.

The department is primarily located on a triangular site bordered by Banbury Road to the west, Parks Road to the east, and Keble Road to the south. Its main building is the Thom Building, a tall concrete and glass structure completed in the 1960s. The building contains lecture theatres, teaching and research laboratories, and administrative offices, and is equipped with a rooftop wind tunnel used for aerodynamics research.

Additional low-rise buildings have been constructed to the north in subsequent years, forming an interconnected complex of facilities. The department's location within the Oxford University Science Area places it in close proximity to institutions such as the Oxford University Museum of Natural History and the Radcliffe Science Library, as well as landscaped open spaces like the Oxford University Parks.

== Buildings ==
The department is headquartered in the Thom Building, constructed in 1960, which contains two main lecture theatres, four floors of teaching, research, and technical support laboratories, core administrative offices, and a dedicated student study area. Adjacent to the Thom Building is a cluster of four interconnected buildings that house academic and postgraduate research space, some of which is shared with the Department of Materials.

In addition to its main site, the department operates several satellite facilities across Oxford. These include the Old Road Campus Building (home to the Institute of Biomedical Engineering), the Southwell Building (housing the Oxford Thermofluids Institute), Eagle House (home to the Oxford Man Institute for Quantitative Finance), the George Building (hosting the Oxford Robotics Institute) and the Institute for Advanced Technology at Begbroke Science Park.

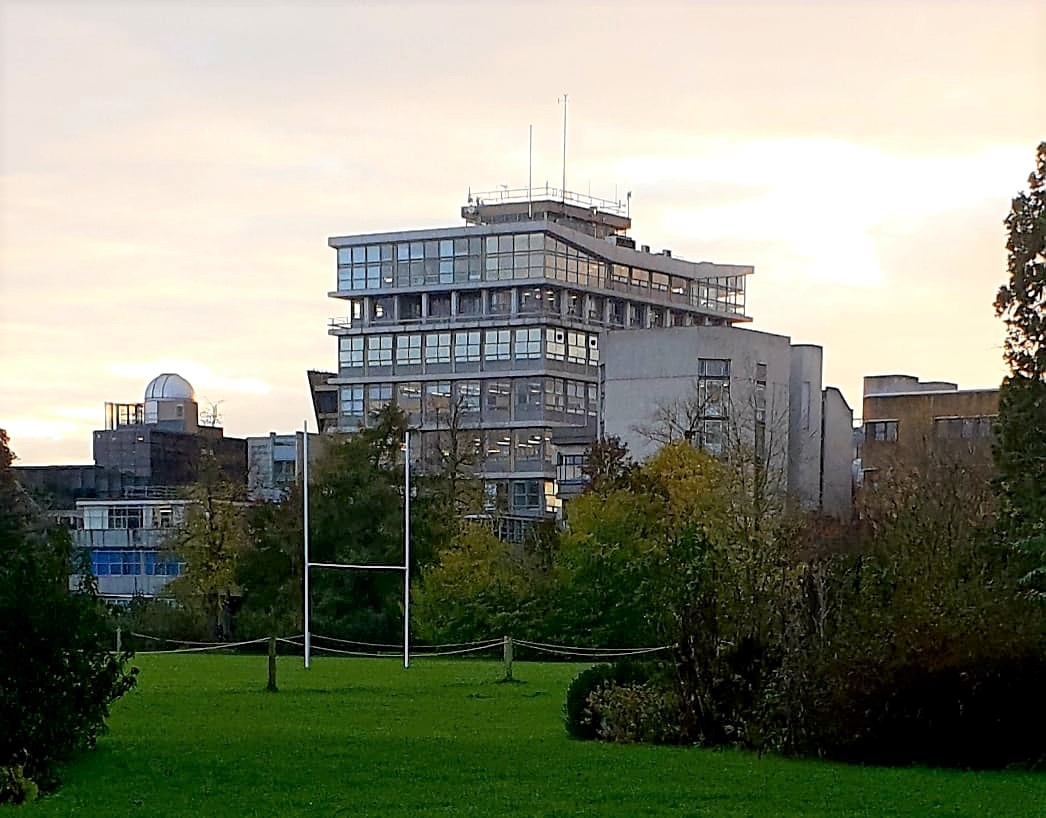
The Thom Building and the Holder Tower as seen from Oxford University Parks.

== History ==
The Department of Engineering Science at the University of Oxford was established in 1908 with the appointment of its first professor, Frewen Jenkin, a distinguished engineer and grandfather of Lord Jenkin of Roding. The department’s Jenkin Building is named in his honour. On 2 February 1909, the Honour School of Natural Science (Engineering Science) was formally instituted by the University of Oxford Statutes, marking the beginning of structured engineering education at the university.

Originally located at 6 Keble Road, on the southern edge of what is now known as the Keble Road Triangle within the Oxford University Science Area, it has since grown with the core of the department still occupying this site. The main departmental building, the Thom Building, was completed in 1963. It is named after Alexander Thom (1894–1985), a Scottish engineer, professor of engineering at Oxford, and pioneer in the study of archaeoastronomy, particularly known for his work on megalithic sites and ancient metrology. The adjacent Holder Building, opened in 1976, is named after Professor Douglas W. Holder, who played a significant role in expanding the department’s academic and research activities.

In 2008, the Department of Engineering Science celebrated its centenary, where Lord Jenkin served as patron. Events included lectures, exhibitions, and the publication of a commemorative history, Mechanicks in the Universitie, authored by Alastair Howatson.

Oxford’s Department of Engineering Science is unique in the UK for offering a general engineering degree at the undergraduate level, rather than requiring immediate specialization. In particular, students study a broad core curriculum covering mechanical, civil, electrical, biomedical, and information engineering in the early years, followed by specialization in later stages. This integrated model is designed to develop engineers with strong interdisciplinary and analytical skills.

The department hosts several institutes, including the Oxford Robotics Institute, known for advances in autonomous navigation and robotics; the Institute of Biomedical Engineering, which focuses on medical imaging, diagnostic systems, and computational physiology; and the Oxford Thermofluids Institute, specializing in fluid mechanics, combustion, and heat transfer.

In 2023, the department received a £10 million philanthropic gift from the Reuben Foundation to advance research in sustainable infrastructure and climate-resilient energy systems.

== Undergraduate programme ==
The intake of students into the department is between 160 and 170 annually. The department offers a general engineering course, where students only specialise in one of six areas in their third and fourth years of their Masters in Engineering degree (MEng). These specialisations are:

1. Biomedical Engineering
2. Chemical Engineering
3. Civil Engineering
4. Electrical Engineering
5. Information Engineering
6. Mechanical Engineering

Students can also choose to follow an Engineering, Entrepreneurship and Management (EEM) pathway in the third and fourth years of their degree. This option is taught in coordination with the Saïd Business School.

== Graduate programmes and research ==
The department has approximately 500 full-time and part-time postgraduate research students. The research degrees offered by the department are Masters by Research - MSc(R), Doctor of Engineering - DEng and Doctor of Philosophy - DPhil.

Research is conducted in the following areas:

- Biomedical Engineering
- Chemical Engineering
- Civil Engineering
- Control Systems Engineering
- Electrical Engineering
- Energy Engineering
- Engineering, Entrepreneurship, Management
- Information Engineering
- Materials
- Offshore Engineering
- Opto-electronics
- Process Engineering
- Solid Mechanics
- Thermo-fluids
- Turbomachinery

The department also houses the following research institutes:

1. Oxford e-Research Centre
2. Oxford Institute of Biomedical Engineering (IBME)
3. Oxford-Man Institute (OMI)
4. Oxford Robotics Institute (ORI)
5. Oxford Thermofluids Institute (OTI)
6. The ZERO Institute
7. The Podium Institute

== Spin-out companies ==
Approximately 40 spin-out companies have been founded from research originating from the department. These start-ups continue to operate across sectors including medical technology, biotechnology, energy, transportation, instrumentation, materials science, nanotechnology, optics, robotics, and information technology. Notable examples are PowderJect Pharmaceuticals, YASA, OrganOx, First Light Fusion, Oxsonics, Oxbotica, Sensyne Health, OxVent, Mind Foundry, Oxa, and Opsydia.

== Research evaluation ==
The department was ranked third among UK engineering departments in 2021 Research Excellence Framework (REF), having previously ranked first in 2014.

REF score
Assessment year	GPA	National ranking
2021	3.67	3
2014	3.53	1

== Notable alumni and faculty ==
Fellows of the Royal Society

- J. Michael Brady
- Alison Noble
- Philip Torr
- Andrew Blake
- Roberto Cipolla
- Andrew Zisserman
- Brian Spalding
- Charles Frank
- Warren East, CEO of Rolls-Royce
- Hugh F. Durrant-Whyte
- Donal Bradley
- Charles Frewen Jenkin
- Richard Vynne Southwell
- Derman Christopherson
- David Clarke
- Laszlo Solymar
- Ted Paige

Timoshenko Medal Recipients

- Richard Vynne Southwell

Heads of Department

- 1908-1929: Charles Frewen Jenkin
- 1929-1942: Richard Vynne Southwell
- 1945-1961: Alexander Thom
- 1961-1977: Douglas William Holder
- 1979-1989: Charles Peter Wroth
- 1989-1994: J. Michael Brady
- 1994-1999: David Clarke
- 1999-2004: Rodney Eatock Taylor
- 2004-2009: Richard Darton
- 2009–2014: Guy Houlsby
- 2014–2019: Lionel Tarassenko
- 2019–2024: Ronald A. Roy
- 2024-present: Clive Siviour

Alumni with Significant Contributions

- Rowan Atkinson, actor, comedian, and screenwriter
- Brian Bellhouse, founder of PowderJect
- Donal Bradley, pioneer in molecular electronic materials
- Brian Spalding, a founder of computational fluid dynamics.
- Hugh F. Durrant-Whyte, known for probabilistic methods for robotics
- Warren East, CEO of Rolls-Royce Holdings
- Paul Newman (engineer), founder of Oxbotica
- Alison Noble, medical imaging researcher and first female Statutory Professor in Engineering at Oxford
- Janet Pierrehumbert, National Academy of Sciences, ISCA Medal for Scientific Achievement 2020
- Eleanor Stride, pioneer in drug delivery systems, Blavatnik Award for Young Scientists
- Andrew Zisserman, pioneer in computer vision
- Leslie Fox, mathematician known for numerical analysis, doctorate student of Richard Vynne Southwell
- Bill Bradfield, aviation engineer, and recipient of Edward Warner Award
- Ann Nicholson, Dean in the Faculty of Information Technology of Monash University
- John O'Connor, co-inventor of the Oxford Knee

== See also ==
- Engineering science
- Oxford Robotics Institute
- Department of Materials, University of Oxford
- Department of Physics, University of Oxford
- Glossary of engineering
- Oxford Instruments
- Department of Engineering, University of Cambridge
