= Hugh F. Durrant-Whyte =

British-Australian engineer and academic

Hugh Durrant-Whyte FRS FAA
- Born: Hugh Francis Durrant-Whyte; 6 February 1961 (age 65); London
- Education: University of Pennsylvania; University of London
- Known for: Simultaneous localization and mapping (SLAM)
- Awards: M. A. Sargent Medal
- Scientific career
- Fields: Robotics; Machine Learning
- Workplaces: University of Oxford; The University of Sydney
- Doctoral advisor: Richard P. Paul
- Doctoral students: Alec Cameron; John J. Leonard; James Manyika; Paul Newman; Jeffrey Uhlmann; Simukai Utete
- Website: sydney.edu.au/engineering/people/hugh.durrantwhyte.php

Hugh Francis Durrant-Whyte FRS FAA (born 6 February 1961) is a British-Australian engineer and academic. He is known for his pioneering work on probabilistic methods for robotics. The algorithms developed in his group since the early 1990s permit autonomous vehicles to deal with uncertainty and to localize themselves despite noisy sensor readings using simultaneous localization and mapping (SLAM).

== Early life and education ==
Durrant-Whyte was born on 6 February 1961 in London, England. He was educated at Richard Hale School, then a state grammar school in Hertford, Hertfordshire. He studied engineering at the University of London, graduating with a first class Bachelor of Science (BSc) degree in 1983. He then moved to the United States where he studied systems engineering at the University of Pennsylvania: he graduated with a Master of Science in Engineering (MSE) degree in 1985 and a Doctor of Philosophy (PhD) degree in 1986. He was a Thouron Scholar in 1983.

== Career and research ==
From 1986 to 1987, Durrant-Whyte was a BP research fellow in the Department of Engineering Science, University of Oxford, and a Fellow of St Cross College, Oxford. Then, from 1987 to 1995, he was a Fellow of Oriel College, Oxford, and a university lecturer in engineering science.

In 1995, he accepted a chair at the University of Sydney as Professor of Mechatronic Engineering. He was also director of the Australian Centre for Field Robotics (ACFR) from 1999 to 2002. From 2002 until 2010 he held the position of Research Director of the Australian Research Council Centre of Excellence for Autonomous Systems (CAS), a joint venture between the ACFR and mechatronics groups at the University of Technology, Sydney and the University of New South Wales. He was elected as a Fellow of the Royal Society in 2010. Hugh has published more than 350 research papers, graduated more than 70 PhD students, and won numerous awards and prizes for his work. He played a critical role in raising the visibility of Australian robotics internationally and was named "Professional Engineer of the year" (2008) by the Institute of Engineers Australia Sydney Division and NSW "Scientist of the Year" (2010).

Durrant-Whyte is one of the early pioneers of SLAM with John J. Leonard. Durrant-Whyte became the CEO of NICTA on 13 December 2010. He resigned as NICTA CEO on 28 November 2014 citing differences with the Board over future funding arrangements.

He was appointed as the Chief Scientific Adviser at the UK Ministry of Defence on 27 February 2017. As a dual citizen with Australian and British citizenship, Durrant-Whyte was barred from overseeing the UK's nuclear weapons programme.

In May 2018 Durrant-Whyte was appointed NSW Chief Scientist & Engineer by Gladys Berejiklian, NSW Premier. He took up his appointment on 3 September 2018.

=== Honours and awards ===
His awards include

- FRS – Fellow of the Royal Society
- FAA – Fellow of the Australian Academy of Science
- FREng – Fellow of the Royal Academy of Engineering (2018)
- FIEEE – Fellow of the Institute of Electrical and Electronics Engineers
- FTSE – Fellow of the Academy of Technological Sciences and Engineering
- HonFIEAus – Honorary Fellow of the Institute of Engineers Australia
- M A Sargent Medal (2017)
- NSW Scientist of the Year (2010)
- IEEE Distinguished Lecturer Award (2009)
- ATSE Clunies Ross Award (2009)
- Professional Engineer of the year (2008) Institute of Engineers Australia, Sydney
- IFR/IEEE Invention and Entrepreneurship Award (2007)
- New South Wales Pearcy Award (2004)
- Harry Lees Award (2004) Institute of Marine Engineers
- Warren Centre Innovation Hero (2003)
- BAE Systems Chairman's Gold Award (2003)
- Four IEEE Best Paper prizes (IROS 1994 and 2006, Data Fusion1997, Robotics 2004)

== Offices held ==
Government offices
Preceded by Vernon C. Gibson	Chief Scientific Adviser to the Ministry of Defence; 2017–2018	Succeeded by Dame Angela McLean
Preceded by Mary O'Kane	Chief Scientist & Engineer for New South Wales; 2018–	Incumbent
