= Oxford Robotics Institute =

- Parent institution: Information Engineering Research Cluster, Department of Engineering Science, University of Oxford
- Director: Nick Hawes

The Oxford Robotics Institute (ORI) is an interdisciplinary division within the University of Oxford. It is dedicated to researching robotics, artificial intelligence, systems engineering, and other related fields. The ORI is a subsidiary of the Department of Engineering Science.

Information engineering Professor Nick Hawes is the current director of the ORI.

== Sub-divisions (Labs) ==
The ORI is divided into six groups, each with a different specialisation.

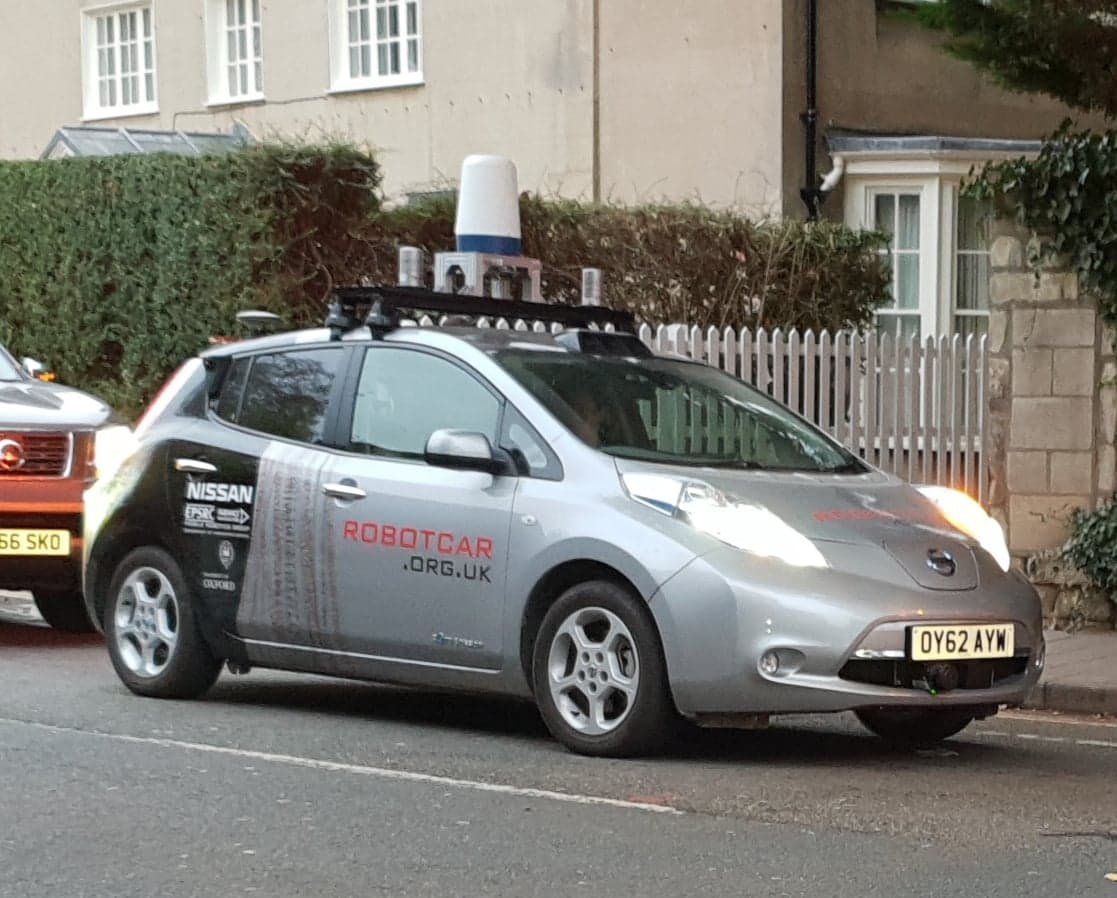
Modified Nissan Leaf used in the ORI's Mobile Robotics Group Robotcar project in the streets of Oxford

1. Mobile Robotics Group (MRG): navigation systems, autonomous vehicles. This group was previously headed by Paul Newman. Newman went on to found Oxbotica (now call Oxa) where he is the CTO.
2. Applied AI Lab (A2I): artificial intelligence and machine learning.
3. Dynamic Robot Systems Group (DRS): mapping, and navigation for dynamically moving robots.
4. Goal-Oriented Long-Lived Systems (GOALS): long-term autonomy and planning for robots operating for long periods of time in uncertain dynamic environments.
5. Articulated Robotics Group (ARG): control, motion planning for dynamically moving robots.
6. Soft Robotics Lab: explores how compliance in the robot body can be exploited for dealing with task and environment uncertainty and for interacting with humans.
7. Neural Processing Lab: foundational neuroscience, machine learning methods development, and systems applications such as Brain Computer Interfaces (BCIs).

== Activities ==
Among the ORI's projects are various autonomous vehicles as a part of the Mobile Robotics Group's Robotcar project. There have been various iterations of the hardware and software used in these experiments. The first vehicle used as a research platform by the Mobile Robotics Group was a Bowler Wildcat provided by BAE Systems in 2011. Since then, various Land Rovers as well as other models (such as the Nissan Leaf) have been used as subsequent generations of research platforms.
