= African Institute for Mathematical Sciences =

Tertiary education and research institute in South Africa

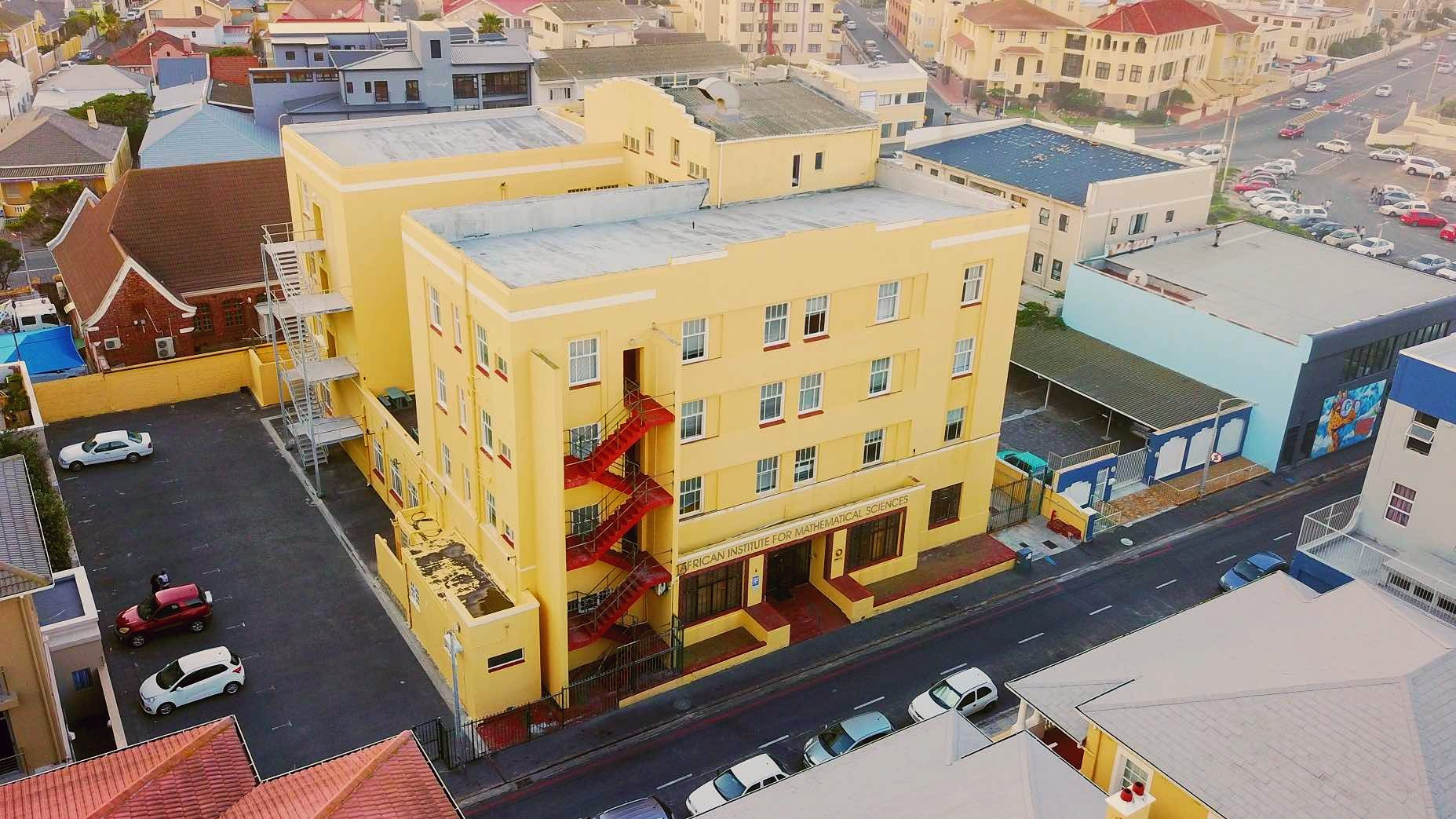
- AIMS building in Muizenberg
- Motto: Building Science in Africa
- Type: Private, Boarding, Non-profit
- Established: 2003
- Director: Barry Green
- Students: 75 students (2012)
- Location: (South Africa) Muizenberg, Western Cape, South Africa; 34.1072°S 18.4706°E
- Colors: Green, yellow, red
- Website: www.aims-network.org
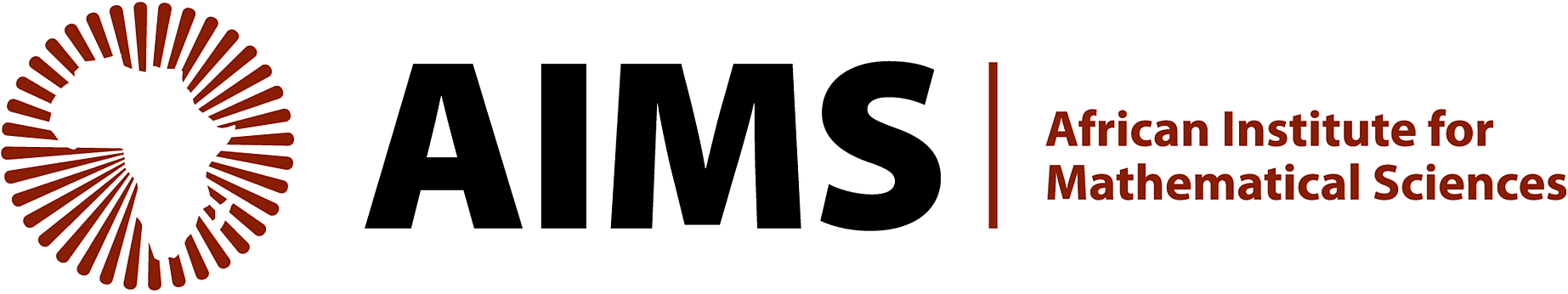

The African Institute for Mathematical Sciences (AIMS) is a pan-African network of postgraduate schools teaching mathematical sciences. Established in 2003 in Cape Town, South Africa, AIMS offers postgraduate training, research, and public engagement programs aimed at building scientific capacity across Africa. The institute was founded by physicist Neil Turok to educate African students in STEM fields to support the continent's development.

== History ==
=== Founder ===
The first African Institute for Mathematical Sciences was founded in Muizenberg near Cape Town by Neil Turok in 2003, while he was Chair of Mathematical Physics at Cambridge University. Neil Turok is the son of Ben Turok, an ANC MP. In 2008 Turok became Executive Director of the Perimeter Institute for Theoretical Physics, and was replaced by Dr Robert Myers in 2019.

AIMS South Africa was formed as a partnership between the following universities: University of Stellenbosch, University of Cambridge, University of Cape Town, University of Oxford, University of Paris-Sud, and University of the Western Cape.

=== AIMS Next Einstein Initiative ===
AIMS was the subject of a talk by Neil Turok after he received the TED Prize in 2008. Neil Turok's TED wish was that, within his lifetime, an African Einstein would be celebrated.

The AIMS Next Einstein Initiative is a plan to create 15 more AIMS centres across Africa. These centres intend to create institutions that are equipped with educational and scientific resources equivalent to the more developed continents, in order to fulfil Neil Turok's TED wish.

The first three centres created after that in South Africa are in Senegal, Ghana and Cameroon. AIMS Senegal became operational in September, 2011 in Mbour, near Dakar, and AIMS Ghana opened its doors in 2012 in the small coastal city of Biriwa. An earlier centre based at the African University of Science and Technology (AUST) in Nigeria was known as AIMS Abuja for a while. AIMS Ghana was set up in 2012, AIMS Cameroon in 2013 and AIMS Tanzania in 2014. There is a sixth centre in Rwanda.

The AIMS Next Einstein Initiative is a continuation of the work of the African Mathematical Institutes Network (AMI-Net).

After AIMS South Africa won the TED Prize in 2008, Neil Turok and his partners developed the AIMS Next Einstein Initiative, the goal of which is to build 15 centres of excellence across Africa by 2023. The Government of Canada made a US$20 million investment in the Next Einstein Initiative in 2010, through its International Development Research Centre, and numerous governments in Africa and Europe have followed suit. In October 2015, a forum took place in Dakar under the auspices of UNESCO's International Basic Sciences Programme to take the project for a vast network of centres to the next stage.

== Mission ==
=== Teaching and research ===
The AIMS institutes teach both basic and applied mathematics, covering a large range of mathematical applications in physics (including astrophysics and cosmology), quantitative biology, bioinformatics, scientific computing, finance, agriculture modelling and so on. That in Senegal proposes courses in both French and English. In addition to its academic programmes, AIMS South Africa has a research centre in interdisciplinary areas like cosmology, computing and finance (see below). In 2015, AIMS Cameroon was planning to launch its own research centre to host resident and visiting researchers from universities in Cameroon and beyond.

=== Community service ===
The AIMS institutes provide community services. AIMS Senegal has developed an innovative teaching module for secondary school maths teachers and has partnered with local businesses to raise funds for the creation of a national contest on computer applications and mathematical modelling, with a focus on finding development-oriented solutions. AIMS South Africa directs the AIMS Schools Enrichment Centre for primary and secondary school teachers, which also organizes public lectures, workshops and master classes and supports maths clubs in schools across the country (see below). Scholars and lecturers from AIMS Ghana have equipped teachers at Biriwa Junior High School with an innovative teaching module.

== Locations ==
AIMS lists five centres across Africa:

- Cameroon
- Ghana
- Rwanda
- Senegal
- South Africa

== AIMS South Africa ==
=== Academic programme ===
==== Structured Masters programme ====
The flagship programme of AIMS South Africa is a 10-month Structured Masters programme in the Mathematical Sciences. The programme was upgraded in 2012 from a Postgraduate Diploma. The master's degree is conferred by the three South African universities in the partnership. Students from Africa can apply for full scholarships, including travel, board & lodging, tuition, and a stipend. AIMS is committed to greater participation by women in science and a geographically representative student body from the African continent.

Visiting faculty have included David MacKay, Bernt Øksendal, David Aschman (Cape Town), Alan Beardon (Cambridge), Jordi Campos (Barcelona), Jesus Cerquides (Spanish National Research Council), Patrick Dorey (Durham), Pedro Ferreira (Oxford), Jan Govaerts (Leuven), Barry Green (Stellenbosch), Gordon Johnson (Houston), Dirk Laurie (Stellenbosch), Sanjoy Mahajan (MIT, Olin), Vincent Rivasseau (University of Paris), Bernd Schroers (Heriot-Watt), Robert de Mello Koch (Witwatersrand), Rob Beezer (University of Puget Sound), Jeff Sanders (United Nations University International Institute for Software Technology), and Tadashi Tokieda (Stanford). Each visiting lecturer teaches an intensive three-week-long module.

The goal of the programme is to produce students capable of doing a high quality research-based master's degree. Special emphasis is placed on intuitive understanding, problem solving skills, collaboration, scientific writing skills, and computer modelling using Free Software such as SageMath, SciPy, and R.

AIMS offers scholarships for many alumni continuing studies in South Africa.

==== Honours Degree in Mathematical Biology ====
AIMS, in conjunction with University of Stellenbosch, offers an honours degree in Mathematical Biology for South African students.

==== Honours Degree in Mathematical Finance ====
An honours degree in Mathematical Finance is being offered for South African students in conjunction with University of Stellenbosch and the University of Cape Town.

==== Master's and doctoral studies ====
In the AIMS Research Centre students, often AIMS alumni, study towards a MSc or PhD degree under supervision of a resident researcher in Mathematical Biology and Mathematical Finance.

=== Research centre ===
AIMS South Africa hosts a research centre that opened in May 2008. Stephen Hawking visited the AIMS research centre and AIMS-Next Einstein Initiative launch.

The centre specialises in Mathematical Biology, Industrial Mathematics, Mathematical Finance, Astrophysics & Cosmology, and Computer Algebra. Bursaries are offered for Master's and doctoral studies.

=== School Enrichment Centre ===
AIMS South Africa hosts a School Enrichment Centre which offers free learning resources and professional development courses for South African mathematics teachers.

=== Workshops and conferences ===
AIMS South Africa regularly hosts short conferences or workshops in mathematics and its applications, especially in physics, mathematical finance, epidemiology. Other topics include scientific modelling or system administration using Debian GNU/Linux as a platform.

=== Public lectures ===
Regular public lectures on a wide range of topics are offered by eminent scientists at the forefront of research in their field.

=== Funding ===
AIMS South Africa is sponsored by international corporations, international development organisations and the South African departments of Education and Science and Technology. In February 2010, Google donated $1 million to AIMS.

In July 2010, Canada committed CAN$20 million of federal funding to AIMS and the AIMS-Next Einstein Initiative. The funds are administered by the International Development Research Centre and the Perimeter Institute for Theoretical Physics.

In September 2010, the AIMS Next Einstein Initiative AIMS-NEI was awarded US$2 million from Google's Project 10^100.

Individuals donate to AIMS on GivenGain.

== AIMS Ghana ==
AIMS Ghana is among the oldest AIMS centers. Located in West Africa, initially based within the University of Ghana in East-Legon, then based in the idyllic village of Biriwa in the Central Region, and then moved to Accra. The center has been highly patronized by the figure of Francis Allotey. After his demise, the center has been organizing summer camps to outreach recently graduated students and motivate them about math, those summer camps are currently named as Allotey Math Summer Camp after him. A new program to support female students in STEM has also been launched.

=== Academic programme ===
The center has two main programs. The general course focused on mathematics and its applications, and AMMI (African Masterd of Machine Intelligence) the course focused on Machine learning patronized by Google AI. Moustapha Cisse is the founder and director of AMMI since 2018. The goal of AMMI is to bring the best of AI education in Africa and contribute to building a healthy ecosystem of AI practitioners committed to making a positive impact on our societies.

Visiting faculty have included, for the main AIMS Master program: Patrick Dorey (Durham University), Barry Green (Stellenbosch University), Bernd Schroers (Heriot-Watt University), Alessandro Crimi (University of Zurich), Bianca Dittrich (Perimeter Institute for Theoretical Physics) and others. While AMMI visiting faculty included Olivier Bousquet (Google AI), Hugo Larochelle (Google AI), Yann LeCun (New York University), and others. In both programs each visiting lecturer teaches an intensive three-week-long module.

=== Research ===
Since 2014, AIMS Ghana started conducting research on topics related to applied mathematics and epidemiology. Among the published works, there are the projects of Dr. Olivier Menoukeu Pamen (Alexander Humboldt Chair in Ghana) about Stochastic Mortality Modelling for Dependent Coupled Lives, Dr. Alessandro Crimi about epidemiological study on prenatal care, and during the COVID-19 pandemic Esther Opoku Gyasi and Prof. Francis Oduro about cost-effectiveness analysis of COVID-19 data from Ghana.

== Notable staff ==
- Nana Klutse, Climate Science Fellow
- Mohamed El-Amin Ahmed El-Tom, Sudanese mathematician and the first minister of education after the Sudanese Revolution, serving between 2019 and 2022
- Simukai Utete, a Zimbabwean roboticist who served as academic director of AIMS South Africa.
- Angela Tabiri, voted World's Most Interesting Mathematician 2024 in the online contest "Big Internet Math-Off", and founder of Femafricmaths, a nonprofit organization promoting female African mathematicians.
