= Kentaro Toyama =

Japanese computer scientist and international development researcher

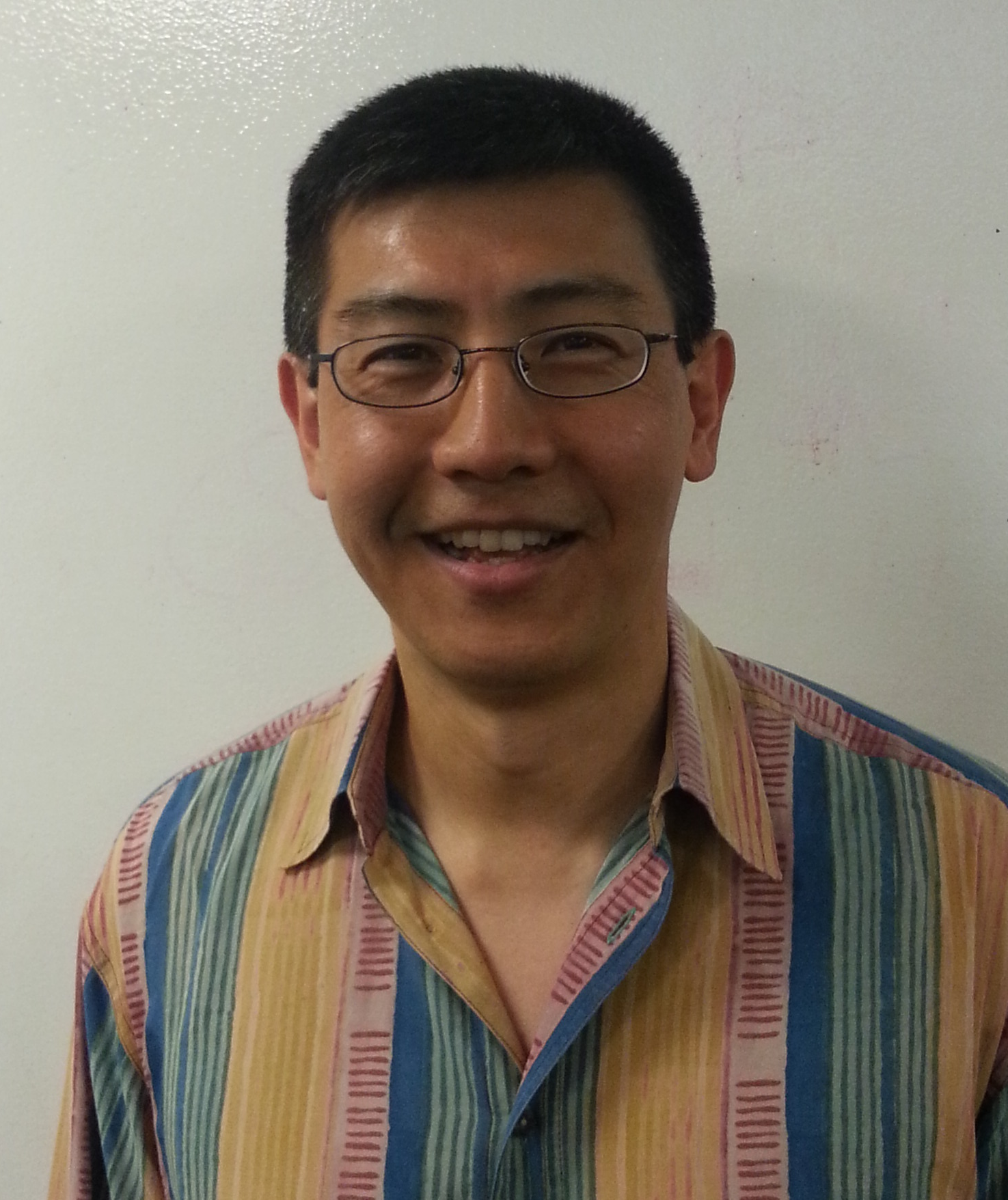
- Education: Yale University (PhD); Harvard University (AB)
- Awards: 2025 SIGCHI Societal Impact Award; ACM SIGCHI Academy Class of 2025; 2022 ACM Fellow; 2016 PROSE Award in Business, Finance & Management
- Scientific career
- Fields: Global Development; ICT and Development; Human-Computer Interaction; Multimedia; Computer Vision
- Workplaces: Microsoft Research; University of Michigan
- Thesis: Robust vision-based object tracking (1998)
- Website: kentarotoyama.org

Kentaro Toyama is a computer scientist and international development researcher, who works on the relationship of technology and global development. He is the W. K. Kellogg Professor at the University of Michigan School of Information and author of Geek Heresy: Rescuing Social Change from the Cult of Technology. He is also a fellow of the Dalai Lama Center for Ethics and Transformative Values at MIT.

Toyama was founding assistant director of Microsoft Research India, a Bangalore-based computer science laboratory, where he established the Technology for Emerging Markets group which conducts interdisciplinary research in the field of "information and communication technologies for development" (ICT4D). Together with AnnaLee Saxenian and Raj Reddy, he co-founded the International Conference on Information and Communication Technologies and Development, a global platform for rigorous, academic, interdisciplinary research in ICT4D.

== Education ==
Toyama graduated from the American School in Japan. Toyama received a Ph.D. in Computer Science from Yale University, and an A.B. in Physics from Harvard University.

== Research and career ==
Toyama's research spans several disparate areas, including ICT4D, development studies, computer vision, human-computer interaction, geographic information systems, and multimedia. He is best known for his research in ICT4D, which includes technology projects such as MultiPoint, Text-Free User Interfaces, Warana Unwired, and Digital Green, as well as observational studies of rural telecenters, mobile phones in developing countries, and the limits of technology for international development.

He is an outspoken critic of the "technological utopianism" that he sees in initiatives such as One Laptop Per Child, and argues that technology only magnifies existing human intent and capacity. A two-part essay making this point appears in a Boston Review forum. The argument is expanded upon and extended further in Geek Heresy. He is also a faculty affiliate of the Science, Technology, and Public Policy (STPP) program at the Gerald R. Ford School of Public Policy.

Toyama's research in computer vision involves automated tracking of objects in video. In 2002, he taught calculus at Ashesi University in Accra, Ghana.

== Awards and honors ==
In 2025, Toyama was inducted into the ACM SIGCHI Academy and also won a SIGCHI Societal Impact Award.

Toyama was also named to the 2022 class of ACM Fellows, "for contributions to the innovation and critique of digital technology for socio-economic development and social justice".

At the University of Michigan, he has won several awards, such as the University of Michigan School of Information Michael D. Cohen Outstanding Service Award (2021), the University of Michigan Public Engagement Faculty Fellowship (2020), and the University of Michigan School of Information Diversity Award (2019).

In 2016, Toyama won the PROSE Award in Business, Finance & Management for his book Geek Heresy.

A paper he co-authored with Andrew Blake was awarded the Marr Prize at the 2001 International Conference on Computer Vision. That work was a precursor to some of the technology in Microsoft's Kinect product.
