= Paul Newman (engineer) =

British robotics engineer, academic and entrepreneur

Paul Newman CBE, FREng
- Citizenship: British
- Education: PhD.
- Alma mater: Balliol College, Oxford; Australian Centre for Field Robotics, University of Sydney
- Known for: Founding Oxford Robotics Institute & Oxa
- Awards: Royal Academy of Engineering Silver Medal (2019)
- Scientific career
- Fields: Robotics; Information engineering Autonomous vehicles
- Institutions: University of Oxford; Keble College, Oxford; Oxa
- Thesis: On the structure and solution of the simultaneous localisation and map building problem (1999)
- Doctoral advisor: Hugh F. Durrant-Whyte
- Website: robots.ox.ac.uk

Paul Michael Newman CBE FREng (born 1973) is a British engineer and academic who founded the Oxford Robotics Institute. He is the BP Professor of Information Engineering at the University of Oxford, a Fellow of Keble College, Oxford, and head of the Oxford Mobile Robotics Group (MRG).

In 2014, he co-founded Oxa with Ingmar Posner, noted for developing the first self-driving cars on British roads.

== Education ==
Newman received an MEng in Engineering Science from Balliol College, Oxford in 1995, followed by a PhD in autonomous navigation from the Australian Centre for Field Robotics, University of Sydney, Australia.

== Career and research ==
Newman’s work on autonomous vehicle technology has led him to author 200 papers and garner over 15,000 citations. He has an h-index of 72 according to Google Scholar. In his doctoral dissertation at the University of Sydney, Newman set out the fundamentals of the large-scale navigation problem SLAM, which would later become one of the most cited papers in the field at over 3,000 citations.

Following his PhD in 1999 under Hugh F. Durrant-Whyte, Newman worked as a Navigation Engineer at Sonardyne International, UK, in 1999 and 2000, where he wrote the navigation algorithms which underpinned operation of autonomous sub-sea vehicles dealing with the Deepwater Horizon oil spill.

In 2000, Newman left industry for MIT, where he was a postdoctoral research scientist, working with Professor John J. Leonard on large-scale field robotics both on land and in the ocean.

He became a Departmental Lecturer in Engineering Science at the University of Oxford in 2003, and set up the Mobile Robotics Group where he developed partnerships with BAE Systems and Nissan. In 2005, he was appointed to a University Lectureship in Information Engineering and elected a fellow of New College Oxford where he was a Tutorial Fellow until 2012. He became Professor of Engineering Science at New College, in 2010, and BP Professor of Information Engineering and Fellow of Keble College in 2012.

In 2010, Newman was awarded an EPSRC Leadership Fellowship. The flagship output was the “Robotcar”, which, in 2013, became the first autonomous vehicle permitted on public roads in the UK. In 2014, Newman, with the newly developed technology and the Robotcar team, co-founded spin-out Oxbotica, later renamed to Oxa.

He founded the Oxford Robotics Institute in 2016 and served as director until 2022.

== Honours, advisory roles and fellowships ==
Newman was elected a Fellow of the Royal Academy of Engineering and Fellow of the IEEE in 2014, both with citations for "outstanding contributions to robot navigation".

He served on the UK Government’s Department for Transport Scientific Advisory Council from 2016 to 2020.

From 2020 Newman has served as a member of the Prime Minister’s Council for Science and Technology.

He was appointed Commander of the Order of the British Empire (CBE) in the 2023 Birthday Honours for services to technology and engineering.
