= Brian Bellhouse =

British academic, engineer, and entrepreneur

- Born: 1 October 1936; Winchelsea, East Sussex, England
- Died: 12 June 2017 (aged 80); Guestling, East Sussex, England
- Education: Magdalen College, Oxford
- Occupations: Academic, engineer, entrepreneur
- Known for: Founder of PowderJect
- Relatives: Paul Drayson, Baron Drayson

Brian J. Bellhouse (1 October 1936 – 12 June 2017) was a British academic, engineer, and entrepreneur, the inventor of PowderJect, a needle-free injection system for delivering medications and vaccines. He was also a professor at the University of Oxford.

== Early life ==
Bellhouse received an undergraduate degree in mathematics from Magdalen College, Oxford, followed by a DPhil degree in engineering science in 1964.

== Academic career ==
Bellhouse was appointed a lecturer and elected a tutorial fellow at Magdalen College in 1966. In 1998, he became a professor of engineering science, and established and supervised the Department of Engineering Science's Medical Engineering Unit at Oxford University. He retired in 2004 and was appointed an Emeritus Fellow of Magdalen College.

== PowderJect ==
In 1992, Bellhouse was at work on a "powdered injector to deliver genetic material into plant cells" when he wondered if he could use the same method on people. A few hours after injecting himself with finely ground salt, the skin began to bleed. As he explained, "Salt bursts the red blood cells. This proved that it had worked. And it was utterly painless. It felt like a puff of air".

Bellhouse developed PowderJect, a needle-free and pain-free injection system which shoots fine powder into the skin at high speed, and his son-in-law Paul Drayson brought along the financing needed to turn it into a commercial reality. PowderJect Pharmaceuticals became a public company in 1997 with a £50 million market valuation. It was later sold to Chiron Corporation for £542 million, and has been called "one of the most successful companies ever to be spun out of Oxford [University]".

== Philanthropy ==
With the profits he gained from the sale of PowderJect Pharmaceuticals, Bellhouse became a major donor to Oxford University, including a "substantial gift" towards the building of the Institute of Biomedical Engineering, and the endowment of the Oxford-Bellhouse Graduate Scholarship in Biomedical Engineering at Magdalen College.

== Personal life ==
Bellhouse was the father-in-law of the Labour peer and former Minister of Science, Paul Drayson, Baron Drayson. He was born and resided in Winchelsea, East Sussex.

== Death ==
On 12 June 2017, Bellhouse, while out for a walk in a field that he owned, was trampled to death as he tried to save his dog from a stampeding herd of cows.
