= Lionel Tarassenko =

British engineer and academic (born 1957)

The Right Honourable The Lord Tarassenko CBE FREng FMedSci FIET
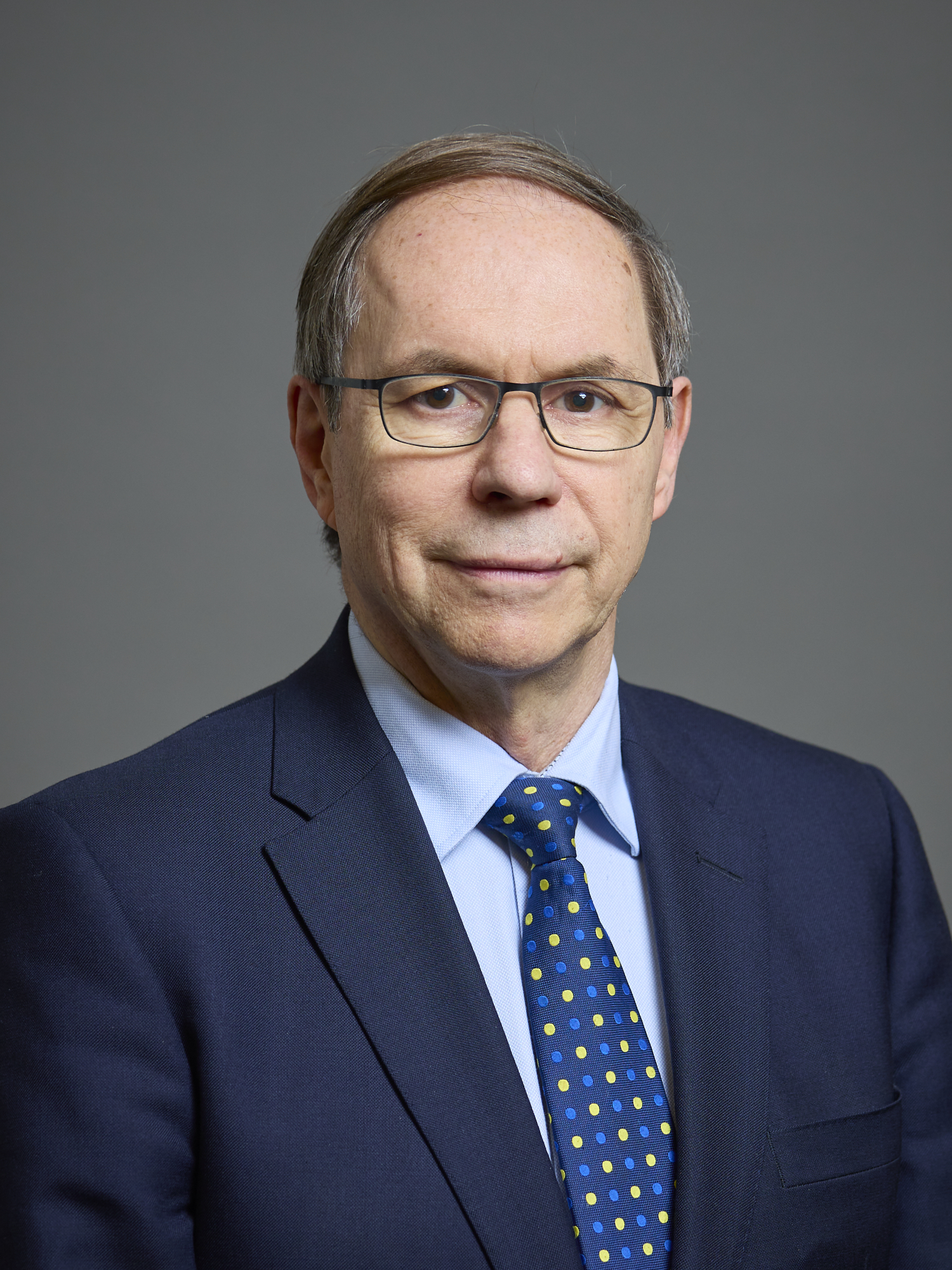
- Official portrait, 2025

Member of the House of Lords
- Lord Temporal
- Life peerage 10 June 2024

President of Reuben College, Oxford
- Incumbent
- Assumed office 7 May 2019
- Preceded by: Office established

Personal details
- Born: Lionel Tarassenko; 17 April 1957 (age 69) Paris, France
- Party: Crossbench
- Spouses: Ann Craven (m. 1978; div. 2001) Anne Le Grice (m. 2001)
- Children: 3 children, 3 step-children
- Education: Keble College, Oxford
- Scientific career
- Awards: British Computer Society Medal (1996); IEE Mather Premium (1996); Rolls-Royce Chairman's Award (2001); E-health 2005 Innovation Award (2005); Silver Medal of the Royal Academy of Engineering (2006); Institute of Engineering & Technology IT Award (2006); Sir Henry Royce High Value Patent Award (2008); Martin Black Prize (2015); Oxford Trust Outstanding Achievement Award for contribution to innovation and society (2019)
- Fields: Biomedical Engineering, Signal Processing, Machine Learning, Digital Health
- Workplaces: University of Oxford

Lionel Tarassenko, Baron Tarassenko, CBE, FREng, FMedSci, FIET (born 17 April 1957), is a French-born British engineer, academic and life peer. A leading expert in the application of signal processing and machine learning to healthcare, he has been the president of Reuben College, Oxford, since 2019.

Tarassenko was previously Head of Department of Engineering Science (Dean of Engineering) at the University of Oxford, succeeded by Ronald A. Roy. Towards the end of his time as dean, the department rose to first place in the Times Higher Education World University Rankings.

In 1988, he was appointed as the first Tutorial Fellow in Engineering at St Hugh's College, Oxford and was a member of the college for over nine years. Tarassenko was elected Professor of Electrical Engineering at the University of Oxford in 1997 and was a Professorial Fellow of St John's College, Oxford, from 1997 to 2019. In 2019 he was invited by the Vice-Chancellor Louise Richardson to oversee the development of Reuben College, the University's 39th college. He is also a Pro-Vice Chancellor and the Chair of the Management Committee of the Maison Française d’Oxford.

Tarassenko has authored more than 280 journal papers, 200 conference papers, 3 books, and more than 30 granted patents. He has supervised 65 doctoral students. He has been a founder director of four University spin-out companies, the latest being Oxehealth in September 2012. He was the R&D Director and Chair of the Strategic Advisory Board of Sensyne Health, an AIM-listed company from 2018 to 2022. He is a director of the University’s wholly owned Technology Transfer company, Oxford University Innovation. He was the editor-in-chief of the 2018 Topol Review of NHS Technology and its impact on the workforce.

Tarassenko was the driving force behind the creation of the Institute of Biomedical Engineering (IBME) at the University of Oxford, which he directed from its opening in 2008 to 2012. He established an £8m Centre of Excellence in Medical Engineering within the IBME, and led the Technology & Digital Health theme in the National Institute for Health and Care Research (NIHR) Oxford Biomedical Research Centre from its inception in 2007 until 2022. Under his leadership, the IBME grew from 110 to 220 academic researchers and it was awarded a Queen’s Anniversary Prize for Higher Education in 2015 for “new collaborations between engineering and medicine delivering benefit to patients”.

== Early life and education ==
Lionel Tarassenko was born in Paris on 17 April 1957 to Sergei and Rachel Tarassenko. His mother was French and his father, a nuclear physicist, was Ukrainian-Latvian. Tarassenko moved to England at the age of 13, gaining British citizenship in 1981. He gained a Bachelor of Arts (BA) degree in engineering science in 1978 at Keble College, Oxford, and obtained a DPhil in medical electronics in 1985, also at Keble College, for his work on the early identification of brain haemorrhages in pre-term infants.

== Career and Research ==
Together with Professor Alan Murray of University of Edinburgh, Tarassenko is the inventor of the pulse-stream technique for analogue implementation of massively parallel neural networks. He gradually moved away from designing neural network hardware to developing new machine learning algorithms and applying them to problems as diverse as the automated re-heating of food and drinks in a microwave oven (implemented in the Sharp LogiCook oven) and the analysis of sleep disorders. This body of work was recognised in 1996 by the award of the IEE Mather Premium for innovation using neural networks.

Tarassenko then went on to develop methods for learning how to characterise normality in safety-critical systems. With his research team, he designed the QUICK system, which was at the core of Rolls-Royce’s engine health monitoring strategy in the 1990s and the early 2000s. As a result, he and his Rolls-Royce collaborators were awarded the Chairman’s Team Award for Technical Innovation in 2001 and the Sir Henry Royce High Value Patent Award in 2008.

When he became the first Director of the Oxford Institute of Biomedical Engineering in 2008, Tarassenko focused his research on patient monitoring, both in and out of hospital. His work has had a major impact on the identification of deterioration in acute care and on the management of long-term conditions. He has been a pioneer in developing early warning systems for acutely ill patients. The machine-learning system (Visensia) which he designed for patient monitoring in critical care was the first such system to gain FDA approval (in 2008).

In the last decade, Tarassenko has led the engineering development of several digital health products including: (a) GDm-Health, a digital therapeutic for the management of gestational diabetes; (b) SEND, a system for monitoring in-hospital patient vital signs and identifying deterioration early;(c) EDGE-COPD, a digital therapeutic for the self-monitoring and self-management of chronic obstructive pulmonary disease; and (d) Support-HF, a system for heart failure management in the community.

Tarassenko has been a founder director of four University spin-out companies, the latest being Oxehealth in September 2012.

== House of Lords ==
In May 2024, the House of Lords Appointments Commission recommended Tarassenko for appointment as a non-party-political life peer. He was created Baron Tarassenko, of Headington in the City of Oxford, on 10 June 2024, and was introduced to the House of Lords on 29 July as a crossbencher.

== Awards and honours ==
Tarassenko was elected to a Fellowship of the Institute of Electrical Engineers in 1996, when he was also awarded the IEE Mather Premium for his work on neural networks, to a Fellowship of the Royal Academy of Engineering in 2000, and to a Fellowship of the Academy of Medical Sciences in 2013. He received a British Computer Society Medal in 1996 for his work on neural network analysis of sleep disorders. His research on jet engine health monitoring was awarded the Rolls-Royce Chairman's Award for Technical Innovation in 2001 and the Sir Henry Royce High Value Patent Award in 2008. His work on mobile phones for healthcare was awarded the E-health 2005 Innovation Award for “best device to empower patients”. He received the 2006 Silver Medal of the Royal Academy of Engineering for his contribution to British engineering leading to market exploitation and he won the Institute of Engineering & Technology IT Award, also in 2006. In 2010, he gave the prestigious Vodafone lecture on mobile health at the Royal Academy of Engineering and the Centenary Lecture on Biomedical Engineering at the Indian Institute of Science in Bangalore. He received the 2015 Martin Black Prize from the Institute of Physics for the best paper in Physiological Measurement

He was appointed a Commander of the Order of the British Empire (CBE) in the 2012 New Year Honours for services to engineering and a 'Chevalier dans l'Ordre national du Mérite' by the French state in 2021.

== Personal life ==
Tarassenko married Lady Ann Mary Elizabeth Craven, daughter of William Craven, 6th Earl of Craven, in 1978. They had two sons and a daughter, and divorced in 2001. In the same year, Tarassenko married Anne Elizabeth Le Grice (née Moss), with whom he has two stepsons and a stepdaughter.

Tarassenko is a lay canon of Christ Church Cathedral, Oxford.

Orders of precedence in the United Kingdom
Preceded by The Lord Hannett of Everton	Gentlemen; Baron Tarassenko	Followed by The Lord Vallance of Balham
