= Nana Klutse =

Ghanaian climate change researcher (born 1981)

Nana Ama Browne Klutse
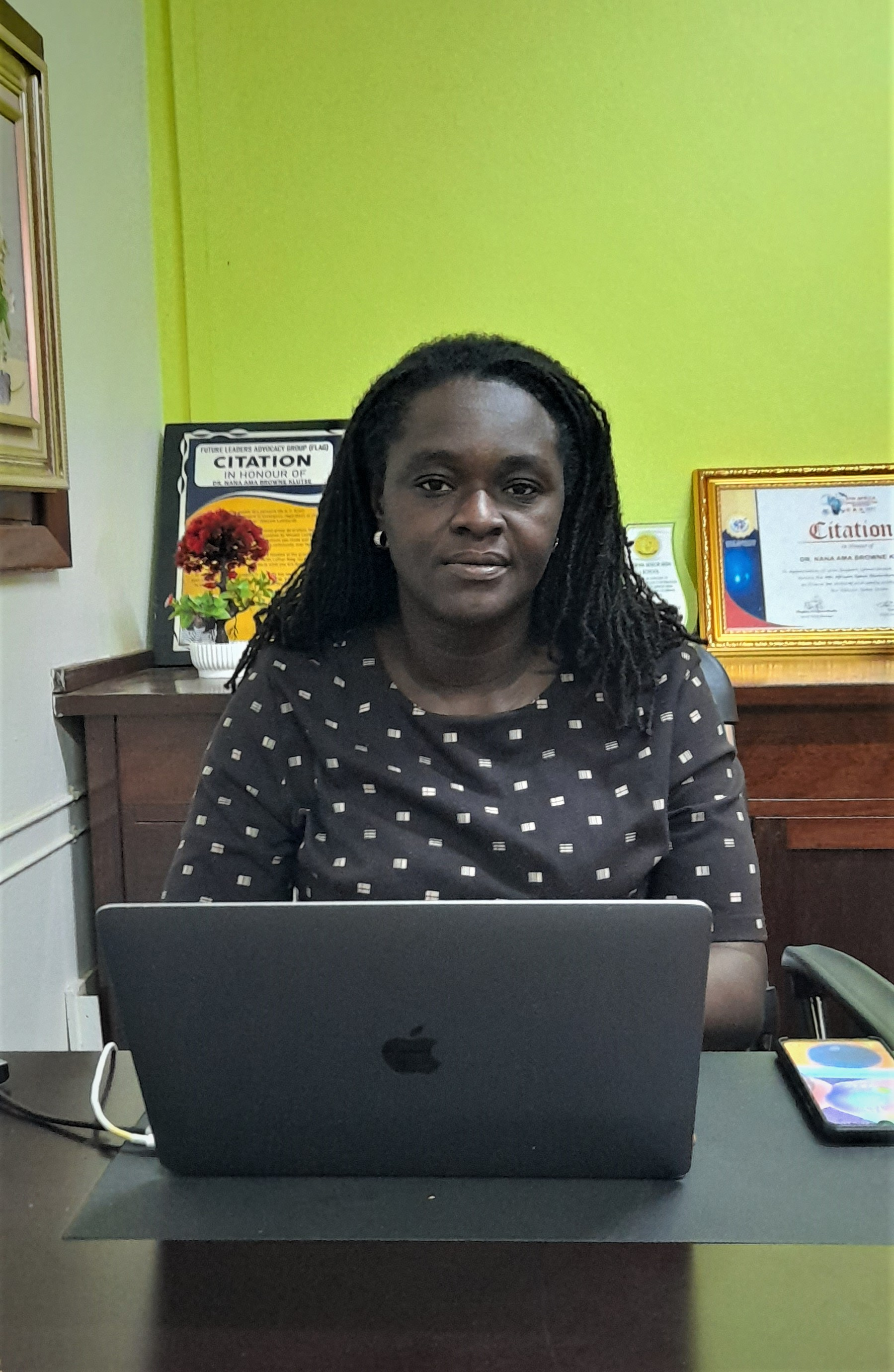
- Klutse in her office at the University of Ghana
- Born: 23 May 1981 (age 45); Nyanfeku Ekroful, Ghana
- Education: University of Cape Coast
- Occupation: Climate scientist
- Employer: University of Ghana
- Known for: Chapter Atlas - IPCC Sixth Assessment Report

Nana Ama Browne Klutse (born 23 May 1981) is a Ghanaian lecturer and climatologist. She is the head of the University of Ghana Physics Department and an associate professor. She is also the Vice-Chair of IPCC’s Working Group I for the seventh assessment cycle.

== Early life and educational background ==
Nana Ama Browne Klutse was born on 23 May 1981 at Nyanfeku Ekroful, Ghana. She had her primary education at the Anomabo Methodist Primary and JHS.

She continued to Mfantsiman Girls Secondary school and later went to University of Cape Coast in Ghana to read BSc Physics. She pursued her PhD Climatology at University of Cape Town in South Africa.

== Scientific career ==
Klutse studies climate dynamics of West Africa. Her work focuses on climate science and development specifically on the African monsoon. She is Professor and the Head of the Department of Physics, University of Ghana. In the past, she managed the Remote Sensing and Climate Centre. Klutse is a Climate Science Fellow of the African Institute for Mathematical Sciences and a lead author contributing to the IPCC Sixth Assessment Report (AR6). She was elected vice-chair of working group I of the IPCC in July 2023.

She also actively encourages girls in Ghana to consider science careers and supports improvements in science education in the country.

Klutse worked at the Ghana Space Science and Technology Institute of the Ghana Atomic Energy Commission as a senior research scientist from 2016 to 2018. Prior to this, she had been a guest lecturer at the West African Science Service Centre on Climate and Adapted Land Use (WASCAL) in Akure, Nigeria.

== Political career ==
Nana Ama Browne Klutse is also active in politics as a member of the National Democratic Congress.

== Appointment ==
Professor Klutse was appointed as the Acting Chief Executive Officer (CEO) of the Environmental Protection Agency (EPA) by President John Dramani Mahama on Saturday, January 18, 2025.
