= Richard Darton =

Chemical engineer

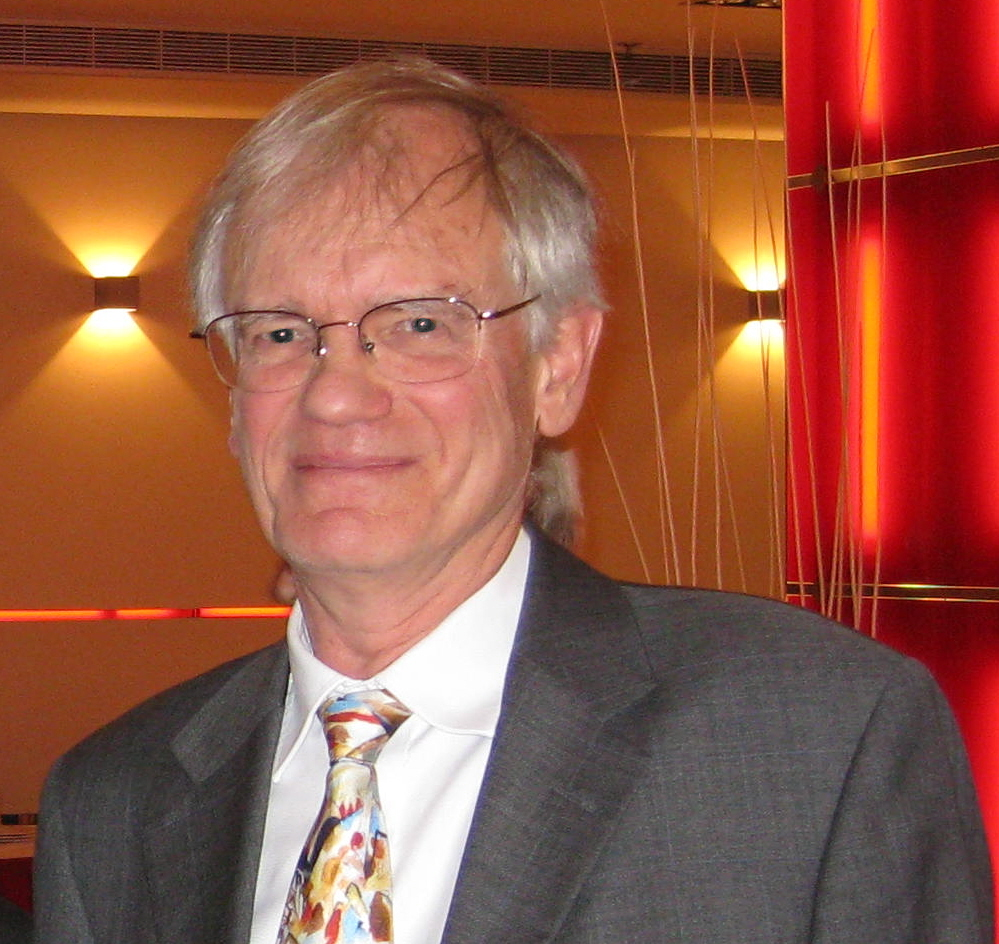
Darton in 2010

Richard Charles Darton, OBE FREng (born 1 July 1948) is the former Head of the Department of Engineering Science, University of Oxford, from 2004 to 2009. For 2008-2009 he was President of the Institution of Chemical Engineers. From 1 January 2010 till 31 December 2014 he was President of the European Federation of Chemical Engineering.

Darton graduated in chemical engineering from the University of Birmingham in 1970, then gained a PhD in 1973 at Downing College, Cambridge, followed by two years of research. He then worked for Shell in the Netherlands. In 1991 he was seconded by the company to set up the first chemical engineering degree course at the University of Oxford, which was recognised by the award of FREng in 2000. In 2001 he joined Oxford as an academic (Keble College), and in 2004 was appointed Head of the Department of Engineering Science.

Darton was appointed Officer of the Order of the British Empire (OBE) in the 2011 Birthday Honours for services to engineering.
