= Charles Frewen Jenkin =

British engineer

- Born: 14 September 1865; Claygate, Surrey, England
- Died: 23 August 1940 (aged 74); St Albans, Hertfordshire, England
- Resting place: St Albans Cathedral
- Other names: C. F. Jenkin; Charles Frewin Jenkin; Frewen Jenkin; Frewin Jenkin
- Education: University of Edinburgh; Trinity College, Cambridge
- Spouse: Mary (1889–1940; his death)
- Children: 3 children
- Awards: Commander of the Order of the British Empire (1919); Fellow of the Royal Society (1931)
- Scientific career
- Fields: Aerospace materials Corrosion fatigue
- Military career
- Allegiance: United Kingdom
- Branch: Royal Navy (1915–18); Royal Air Force (1918–19)
- Service years: 1915–1919
- Rank: Lieutenant Colonel

Charles Frewen Jenkin, CBE, FRS (24 September 1865 – 23 August 1940) was a British engineer and academic. He held the first chair of engineering at the University of Oxford as Professor of Engineering Science.

== Early life ==
Jenkin was born on 24 September 1865 in Claygate, Surrey. He was the second son of Fleeming Jenkin who was Regius Professor of Engineering at the University of Edinburgh. He was educated at Edinburgh Academy, then an all boys private school in Edinburgh. He attended the University of Edinburgh, before matriculating into Trinity College, Cambridge in 1883. As the University of Cambridge had no engineering degree, he instead studied the Mathematical Tripos. He graduated in 1886 with a Bachelor of Arts (BA) degree; as per tradition, this was later promoted to a Master of Arts (MA (Cantab)) degree.

== Career ==
Upon graduation, Jenkin joined Mather & Platt, an engineering company based in Manchester. He then worked for London and North Western Railway based in Crewe, having been granted a Miller scholarship from the Institution of Civil Engineers. In 1891, he joined the Royal Gunpowder Factory in Waltham Abbey as a mechanical assistant superintendent. From 1893 to 1898, he worked for Nettlefolds at their steelworks in Wales. From 1898 to 1908, he worked for the Siemens Brothers. He ended his time with them as head of Siemens's railway department and manager of the works based in Stafford.

=== Academic career ===
On 21 May 1908, Jenkin was elected to the newly constituted position of professor of engineering science at the University of Oxford. In addition to the Chair, he was granted fellowship of New College, Oxford. In 1912, he moved from New College to become a fellow of Brasenose College, Oxford. On 17 May 1913, he was re-elected Professor of Engineering Science to serve for a further five years. In 1914, the Department of Engineering Science was finally collected into one building having previously been spread among many, temporary buildings. During World War I, from 1915 to 1919, he took a break from academia to serve in the Royal Navy and then in the Royal Air Force.

Jenkin returned to Oxford after his military service ended in 1919. He continued the research he undertook at the Ministry of Munitions, and specialised in corrosion fatigue. On 24 May 1923, he was re-elected Professor of Engineering Science to serve for a further five years. In 1929, he resigned from his appointment to concentrate on his research.

Outside of his university work, Jenkin held a number of appointments. He was Chairman of the Materials Subcommittee of the Aeronautical Research Committee, and was also Chairman of the structures investigation committee of the Building Research Board.

=== Military service ===
In May 1915, Jenkin was granted a temporary commission in the Royal Navy Volunteer Reserve in the rank of lieutenant. He worked in the Air Department of the Admiralty. On 5 October 1916, he was promoted to temporary lieutenant commander.

On the amalgamation of the Royal Naval Air Service and the Royal Flying Corps in April 1918, he was appointed head of the branch of the Royal Air Force responsible for aircraft materials. He was granted the rank of lieutenant colonel and attached to the Ministry of Munitions. In 1918, the results of his research in this area were published as Report on Materials of Construction used in Aircraft and Aircraft Engines.

On 31 March 1919, he was transferred to the unemployed list, thereby ending his military service.

== Later life ==
Following his retirement from the University of Oxford, Jenkin moved to St Albans, Hertfordshire. He survived a series of heart attacks in 1933 but was left living in pain.

He died on 23 August 1940 at his home in St Albans. His funeral and burial took place on 27 August 1940 at St Albans Abbey.

== Personal life ==
In 1889, Jenkin married Mary Oswald Mackenzie, youngest daughter of the Scottish Judge Lord Mackenzie. Together they had two sons and a daughter. His was outlived by his wife and their daughter May.

His younger son Conrad Jenkin (1894–1916) died while serving in the Royal Navy during World War I. His elder son Charles Oswald Frewen Jenkin (1890–1939) was an engineer. His grandchildren and great-grandchildren include Patrick Jenkin, a cabinet minister and life peer, and Bernard Jenkin, a member of parliament.

He was a self-taught multi-linguist: he spoke medieval French, medieval Spanish, Italian, Portuguese, and Catalan, in addition to his native English.

== Honours ==
During World War I, at some time between May 1915 and March 1919, he was appointed Member of the Order of the British Empire (MBE). In the 1919 King's Birthday Honours, he was promoted to Commander of the Order of the British Empire (CBE) 'in recognition of distinguished services rendered during the war'.

He was elected a Member of the Institution of Electrical Engineers in 1901 and a Member of the Institution of Civil Engineers in 1912. On 7 May 1931, he was elected Fellow of the Royal Society (FRS).

He was awarded the Telford Medal and the James Watt Medal by the Institution of Civil Engineers. The Jenkin Building of the Department of Engineering Science, University of Oxford is named after him.
