= Langley School, Solihull =

Langley School

Location
- Kineton Green Road, Olton; Solihull, West Midlands, B92 7ER; England
- Coordinates: 52°25′42″N 1°48′44″W

Information
- Type: Academy
- Motto: 'Be the best you can be!'
- Religious affiliation: Non-denominational
- Specialist: Arts, Language
- Department for Education URN: 137007 Tables
- Ofsted: Reports
- Staff: Headteacher, Mrs Thorpe
- Gender: co-educational
- Age: 11 to 16
- Enrolment: 1002
- Colours: Black, White and Red
- Website: http://www.langley.solihull.sch.uk/

Langley School is a secondary school with academy status situated in the Metropolitan Borough of Solihull, West Midlands. It has specialist status in the arts, languages and training.

The school is a mixed, 11–16 comprehensive school with a current pupil roll of 1002. In September 2002 the school became a specialist Performing Arts College, in 2006 a specialist Language College and Training School.

== Alumni ==
- Elizabeth Bower, actress
- Roberto Cipolla, professor
- Darren Carter, footballer
- Ashley Sammons, footballer
- Phil Hawker, footballer
- Charlie Lakin, footballer
