= Andrew Blake (computer scientist) =

British scientist

Professor Andrew Blake FRS FREng
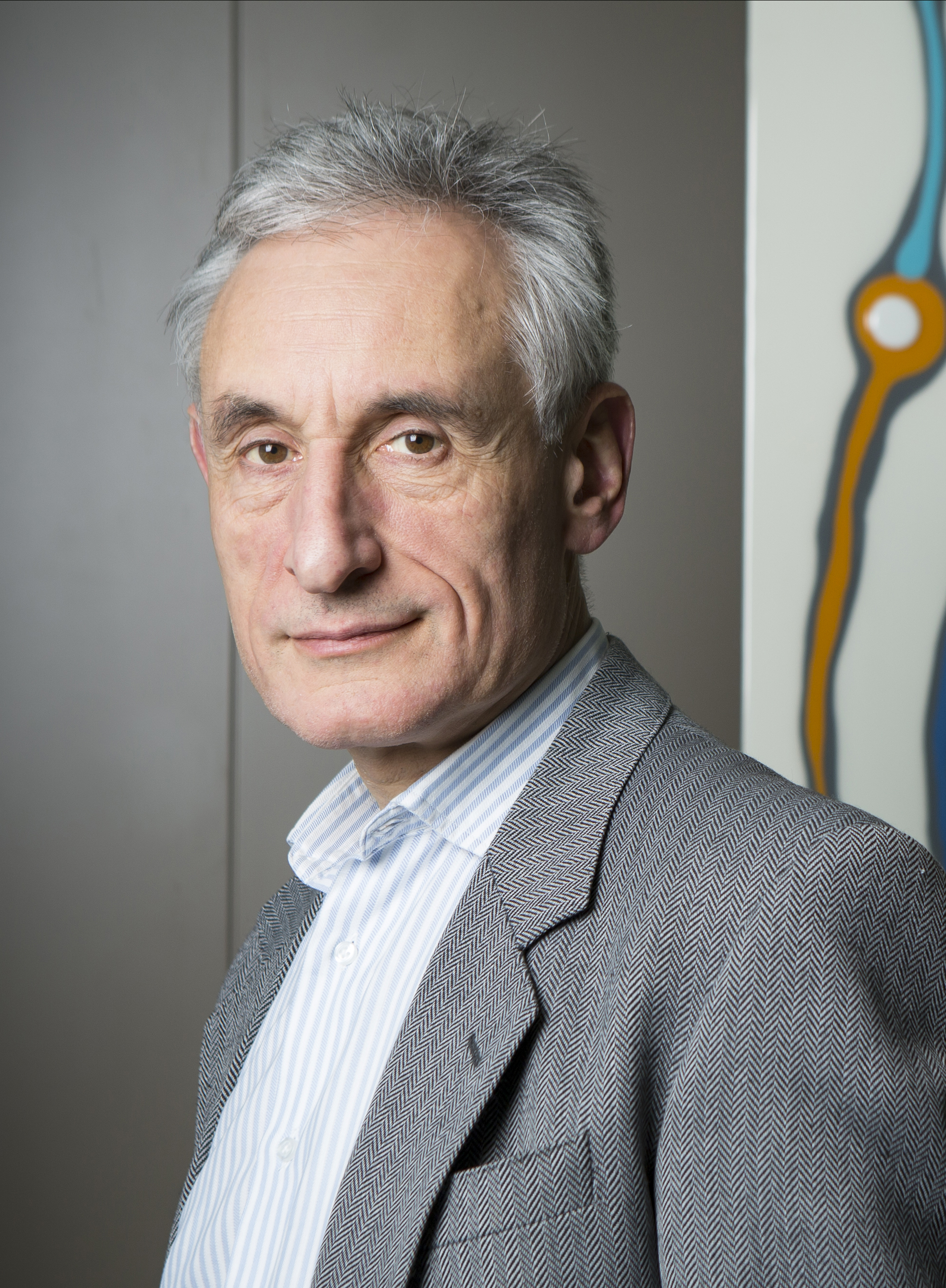
- Born: 12 March 1956 (age 70)
- Education: Rugby School; University of Cambridge (BA); University of Edinburgh (PhD)
- Awards: FRS; FREng
- Scientific career
- Fields: Computer Vision; Machine Intelligence; Visual Perception; Robotics
- Workplaces: University of Edinburgh; University of Oxford; Microsoft Research; University of Cambridge; Alan Turing Institute
- Thesis: Parallel computation in low-level vision (1983)
- Doctoral advisor: Donald Michie
- Website: ablake.ai

Andrew Blake (born 12 March 1956) is a British scientist, former laboratory director of Microsoft Research Cambridge and Microsoft Distinguished Scientist, former director of the Alan Turing Institute, Chair of the Samsung AI Centre in Cambridge, honorary professor at the University of Cambridge, Fellow of Clare Hall, Cambridge, and a leading researcher in computer vision.

== Education ==
Blake was educated at Rugby School and graduated in 1977 from Trinity College, Cambridge with a Bachelor of Arts degree in Mathematics and Electrical Sciences. After a year as a Kennedy Scholar at Massachusetts Institute of Technology (MIT) and two years in the defence electronics industry, he studied at the University of Edinburgh for a PhD, which was awarded in 1983 and supervised by Donald Michie.

== Career and research ==
Until 1987 he was on the faculty of the department of Computer Science at the University of Edinburgh, as a Royal Society University Research Fellow. From 1987 to 1999, he was on the academic staff of the Department of Engineering Science in the University of Oxford, where he became a professor in 1996, and was a Royal Society Senior Research Fellow for 1998-9.

In 1999 he moved to Microsoft Research Cambridge as senior research scientist, where he founded the Computer Vision Group. In 2008 he became a deputy managing director at the lab, before becoming laboratory director in 2010.

From 2015 to 2018 he was director at the Alan Turing Institute.

Since 2018 he has been the inaugural chair of the Samsung AI Centre in Cambridge.

== Honours and awards ==
Blake was elected Fellow of the Royal Academy of Engineering (FREng) in 1998, Fellow of the Royal Society (FRS) in 2005 and an IEEE Fellow in 2008. In 2006 the Royal Academy of Engineering awarded Andrew its Silver Medal. He has twice won the prize of the European Conference on Computer Vision, with Roberto Cipolla in 1992 and with M. Isard in 1996, and was awarded the IEEE David Marr Prize (jointly with Kentaro Toyama for their paper on Probabilistic Tracking with Exemplars in a Metric Space) in 2001. In 2007 he was awarded the Mountbatten Medal by the Institution of Engineering and Technology (IET). In 2009 he was awarded the Institute of Electrical and Electronics Engineers (IEEE) Computer Vision Distinguished Researcher Award. In 2010 Blake was elected to the council of the Royal Society. In 2011, he and colleagues at Microsoft Research received the Royal Academy of Engineering MacRobert gold medal for their machine learning contribution to Microsoft Kinect human motion-capture. In 2012 he was elected to the board of the EPSRC and also received an honorary degree of Doctor of Science from the University of Edinburgh. In 2013 he was awarded an honorary degree of Doctor of Engineering from the University of Sheffield. In 2014, Blake gave the Josiah Willard Gibbs lecture at the Joint Mathematics Meetings.

== Publications ==
- Markov Random Fields for Vision and Image Processing. 2011. MIT Press.
- (Ed.) Active Vision. 1992. MIT Press.
- Visual Reconstruction. 1987. MIT Press.
