= Geek Heresy: Rescuing Social Change from the Cult of Technology =

2015 book on technology

Geek Heresy: Rescuing Social Change from the Cult of Technology is a 2015 nonfiction book by computer scientist Kentaro Toyama. It was published by PublicAffairs. The book examines the role of technology in international development and social change. Toyama argues that technology usually amplifies existing human and institutional forces rather than solving social problems on its own.

The book draws on Toyama's work in India and his experience with technology projects aimed at education and poverty reduction. It discusses technological utopianism, the digital divide and the use of technology in development.

== Reception ==
Andrew Means reviewed the book in the Stanford Social Innovation Review. He agreed with its criticism of technology as a simple solution to social problems. Means said digital tools could support social change but could not replace the human factors needed to make programmes work.

Henry Reichman reviewed the book for Academe, published by the American Association of University Professors. He praised its first half as an effective critique of technological quick fixes. He was less positive about the second half. He found some of its anecdotes repetitive and considered Toyama's proposed alternatives too simple.

Tony Roberts reviewed the book in The Journal of Community Informatics. He discussed it as a critique of technology-centred approaches to ICT4D. Roberts highlighted its emphasis on human-centred development rather than technological solutions.

Kirkus Reviews gave the book a mixed assessment. It described the argument as well intentioned but found parts of it overly broad. The review nevertheless noted the book's criticism of technology-first approaches to education and economic development.

Anirudh Krishna reviewed the book in Information Technologies & International Development. He praised its critique of technology-led development. He also argued that the book could have given greater attention to management and organisational practices when discussing successful development programmes.

== Awards ==
The book won the 2016 PROSE Award in the Business, Finance and Management category.

== Synopsis ==
Toyama describes his central idea as the law of amplification. He mentions that technology tends to magnify existing human intentions and capacities. Strong institutions may therefore use technology effectively. Weak institutions may gain little from the same tools.

The book applies this argument to education and economic development. It discusses projects such as One Laptop per Child, the Hole in the Wall experiment and Khan Academy. Toyama argues that access to technology alone does not remove inequalities in education.

The second half of the book turns from criticism to social development. Toyama places greater emphasis on individual motivation, judgement and institutional strength. He also discusses mentorship as a way to develop human capacity.
