= Alessandro Crimi =

Italian biomedical engineer and health economist

- Born: June 25, 1983 (age 43); Palermo, Italy
- Education: University of Palermo, MSc; University of Copenhagen, PhD; University of Basel, MBA
- Occupations: Biomedical engineer, health economist
- Employer: AGH University of Krakow
- Known for: Research on brain connectivity and the connectome; contributions to public health projects in Ghana
- Awards: AFRINIC FIRE Awards 2016

Alessandro Crimi (born 25 June 1983 in Palermo) is a biomedical engineer and health economist.

His research includes computational neuroscience, health economics, brain connectivity, as well as applications of emerging technologies in global health.

He is currently a professor at AGH University of Krakow, and visiting lecturer at the African Institute for Mathematical Sciences (AIMS).

== Biography ==
Alessandro Crimi was born on 25 June 1983 in Palermo, Italy. He obtained a Master's degree in Engineering from the University of Palermo in 2007, followed by a PhD from the University of Copenhagen in 2011. In 2016, he completed an MBA in health management at the University of Basel. Subsequently, he obtained the habilitation from AGH University of Krakow in 2026.

Crimi has held postdoctoral research positions at various institutions, including the Institut National de Recherche en Informatique et en Automatique (INRIA), ETH Zurich, the Italian Institute of Technology (IIT), and the University Hospital of Zurich.

Since 2012, he has been a lecturer at the African Institute for Mathematical Sciences (AIMS) in Ghana. He was a research group leader at Sano, center for computational medicine of Poland between 2021 and 2024, and has been since 2023 at AGH University of Krakow.

The prenatal DocmUP initiative improved prenatal care in rural Ghana through mobile applications, portable ultrasound devices, and machine learning to predict gestational age. This and other initiatives in low-income countries have been summarized in his books: Ignite Global Change: Creating Innovation in Low-Resource Environments, and Innovate for impact: A roadmap to sustainable technology beyond AI, which discuss economic issues in Sub-Saharan Africa, South Asia, and Latin America and novel technologies. The economic theories presented in the books and articles discuss economic and technological development in low-resource settings through disruptive technology and frugal innovation in areas with limited economic resources rather than relying on foreign or government aid.

Crimi's research, highlighted in the Association for Computing Machinery (ACM) Digital Library and the Institute of Electrical and Electronics Engineers (IEEE), covers brain connectivity (connectome, medical imaging, and machine learning). He has published work in the field of resting-state brain connectivity analysis using electroencephalography (EEG) and functional near-infrared spectroscopy (fNIRS).

His research has also focused on the analysis of brain networks and connectomes, including methods for identifying multivariate relationships within brain connectivity patterns. His research has also addressed machine learning methods for medical imaging, including multiscale approaches to brain tumor segmentation. More recent research has examined the use of graph neural networks for epilepsy detection from EEG recordings in low-resource settings and the application of spiking neural networks to the analysis of EEG signatures associated with Alzheimer's disease.

Crimi serves as a Review Editor for "Brain Imaging Methods" at Frontiers in Neuroscience and "Neuroimaging Meta-Analyses" at Frontiers in Neuroimaging. He has also been one of the organizers for several years of the International Brain Lesion Workshop of the MICCAI Society, known as BrainLes.

In 2016, Alessandro Crimi was recognized as the winner of the AFRINIC Mobile Innovation FIRE Awards.

== Selected publications ==
The list of Alessandro Crimi's research publications includes:

- Crimi, Alessandro; Commowick, Olivier; Maarouf, Adil; Ferré, Jean-Christophe; Bannier, Elise; Tourbah, Ayman (2014). "Predictive Value of Imaging Markers at Multiple Sclerosis Disease Onset Based on Gadolinium- and USPIO-Enhanced MRI and Machine Learning". PLOS ONE. 9 (4): e93024
- Crimi, A.; Dodero, L.; Sambataro, F.; Murino, V.; Sona, D. "Structurally Constrained Effective Brain Connectivity". NeuroImage. 2021;239(1):118288.
- Mamoń, S.; Talanov, M.; Crimi, A. "Learning Alzheimer's disease signatures by bridging EEG with spiking neural networks and biophysical simulations". Neurocomputing. 2026;705.
- Amoah, B.; Anto, E. A.; Osei, P. K.; Crimi, A. "Boosting antenatal care attendance and the number of hospital deliveries among pregnant women in rural communities: a community initiative in Ghana based on mobile phones". BMC Pregnancy and Childbirth. 2016;16(1):1–10.
- Falcó-Roget, J.; Cacciola, A.; Sambataro, F.; Crimi, A. "Functional and structural reorganization in brain tumors: a machine learning approach using desynchronized functional oscillations". Communications Biology. 2024;7(1):419.
- Mazurek, S.; Moore, S.; Crimi, A. "Graph Attention Networks for Detecting Epilepsy From EEG Signals Using Accessible Hardware in Low-Resource Settings" IEEE Open Journal of Engineering in Medicine and Biology 7, 2026.
- Elsheikh, S. S. M.; Chimusa, E. R.; Mulder, N. J.; Crimi, A. "Genome-wide association study of brain connectivity changes for Alzheimer's disease". Scientific Reports. 2020;10(1):1433.
- Blanco, Rosmary; Koba, Cemal; Crimi, Alessandro. "Investigating the interaction between EEG and fNIRS: a multimodal network analysis of brain connectivity". Journal of Computational Science. 2024;82:102416.
- Crimi, A.; Giancardo, L.; Sambataro, F.; Gozzi, A.; Murino, V.; Sona, D. "MultiLink Analysis: Brain Network Comparison via Sparse Connectivity Analysis". Scientific Reports. 2019.
- Kara, E.; Crimi, A.; Wiedmer, A.; Emmenegger, M.; Manzoni, C.; Bandres-Ciga, S.; et al. "An Integrated Genomic Approach to Dissect the Genetic Landscape Regulating the Cell-to-Cell Transfer of a-Synuclein". Cell Reports. 2021.
