= John J. Leonard =

American roboticist and professor

- Education: University of Oxford; University of Pennsylvania
- Known for: Simultaneous localization and mapping
- Awards: National Science Foundation Career Award (1998)
- Scientific career
- Fields: Robotics
- Workplaces: Massachusetts Institute of Technology
- Website: marinerobotics.mit.edu

John J. Leonard is an American roboticist and Professor of Mechanical and Ocean Engineering at the Massachusetts Institute of Technology. A member of the MIT Computer Science and Artificial Intelligence Laboratory (CSAIL), Leonard is a researcher in simultaneous localization and mapping, and was the team lead for MIT's team at the 2007 DARPA Urban Challenge, one of the six teams to cross the finish line in the final event, placing fourth overall.

== Life and career ==
Leonard received his B.S. in Electrical Engineering from the University of Pennsylvania in 1987 and his D.Phil. in Engineering Science from the University of Oxford in 1994, under the Thouron Award. He spent five years as a postdoctoral fellow and Research Scientist in the MIT Sea Grant Autonomous Underwater Vehicle (AUV) Laboratory, and joined the MIT faculty in 1996.

Leonard is one of the early pioneers of SLAM with Hugh F. Durrant-Whyte. Leonard has served as an associate editor of the IEEE Journal of Oceanic Engineering and of the IEEE Transactions on Robotics and Automation. He received the National Science Foundation Career Award in 1998, an E.T.S. Walton Visitor Award from Science Foundation Ireland in 2004, and the King-Sun Fu Memorial Best IEEE Transactions on Robotics Paper Award in 2006.

Leonard describes his primary research goal as persistent autonomy, i.e., the "capability for one or more robots to operate robustly for days, weeks and months at a time with minimal human supervision, in complex, dynamic environments". Leonard focuses on the problem of simultaneous localization and mapping (SLAM), particularly for autonomous underwater vehicles.
