= Roberto Cipolla =

British computer vision researcher

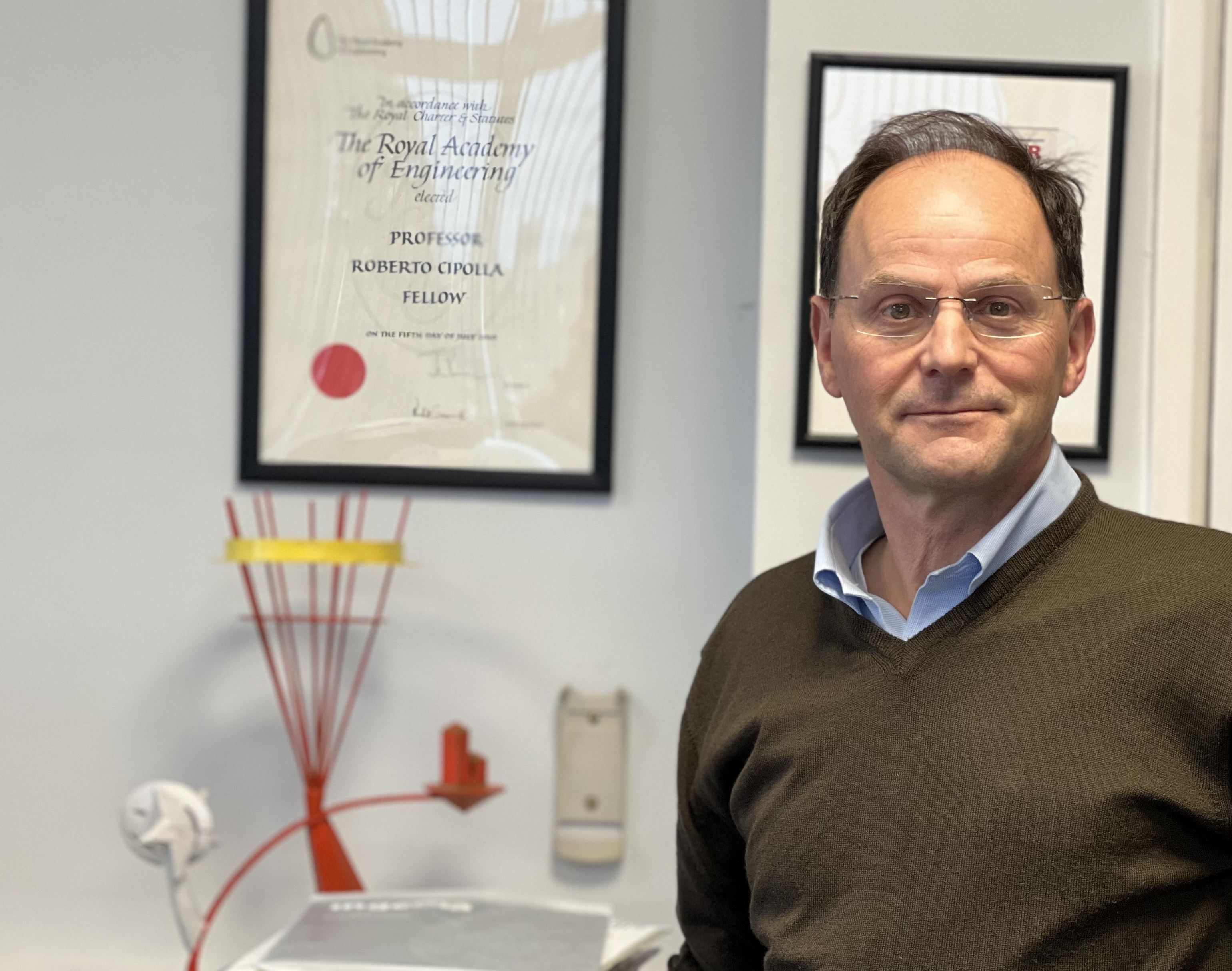
- Born: 3 May 1963 (age 63); Solihull, Warwickshire
- Education: University of Cambridge (BA); University of Pennsylvania (MSE); University of Electro-Communications (MEng); University of Oxford (DPhil)
- Awards: FRS, FREng
- Scientific career
- Fields: Computer Vision
- Workplaces: University of Cambridge
- Thesis: Active visual inference of surface shape (1991)
- Doctoral advisor: Andrew Blake
- Website: mi.eng.cam.ac.uk/~cipolla

Roberto Cipolla (born 3 May 1963) is a British researcher in computer vision and Professor of Information Engineering at the University of Cambridge.

== Education ==
Cipolla was born in Solihull, England and attended Langley School in Solihull and Solihull Sixth Form College. He studied engineering at Queens' College, Cambridge, and graduated in 1984. He obtained an Master's (MSE) degree from the University of Pennsylvania in 1985 and then was a visiting researcher at the Electrotechnical Laboratory in Tsukuba, studied Japanese at the Osaka University of Foreign Studies, and gained a second master's degree (MEng) from the University of Electro-Communications in Tokyo. Cipolla returned to England in 1988 and studied at the University of Oxford (Balliol College). In 1991 he was awarded a D.Phil. (Computer Vision) for his work on 3D reconstruction from smooth 2D contours.

== Career ==
From 1991 to 1992 Cipolla was a Toshiba Fellow and engineer at the Toshiba Corporation Research and Development Centre in Kawasaki, Japan.

In 1992, he returned to the UK and joined the Department of Engineering at the University of Cambridge as a lecturer and a Fellow of Jesus College. He became a Reader in Information Engineering in 1997 and a professor in 2000.

From 2007 Cipolla has also been the Director of Toshiba's Cambridge Research Laboratory and the director of the International Computer Vision Summer School which is held every year in Sicily to train young computer vision researchers.

== Research and impact ==
Cipolla is known for his research contributions to the reconstruction, registration and recognition of three-dimensional objects from images. These include novel algorithms for the recovery of accurate 3D shape, visual localisation and tracking, and semantic segmentation and their practical application.

He has authored two books: Active Visual Inference of Surface Shape in 1995 and Visual Motion of Curves and Surfaces (with Peter Giblin) in 2000; edited twelve books on computer vision and published over 400 articles in computer vision and related fields.

Computer vision technology from Cipolla's research has been exploited in new products by Toshiba (face recognition for access control in varying illumination and a gesture interface for laptops) and Wayve (semantic segmentation for autonomous driving).

Four companies have also been directly spun-out from Cipolla's research team: Metail (3D reconstruction and visualisation of body and clothes for online fitting room) in 2008, Zappar (tracking for Augmented Reality) in 2011, Trya (Snapfeet - 3D modelling of feet for virtual trying on of shoes and size recommendation), and Cambridge Heartwear (Atrial fibrillation detection in wearable ECG) in 2017.

Cipolla became a professor at the Royal Academy of Art Schools, London in 2004, and since 2005 has also worked with artists and sculptors including Anthony Gormley, whose Exposure used his algorithms to convert a small scale solid form into a geometrical system suitable for large scale fabrication.

== Awards and honours ==
Cipolla was elected a Fellow of the Royal Academy of Engineering in 2010; a Distinguished Fellow of the British Machine Vision Association in 2013; and a Fellow of the International Association for Pattern Recognition in 2020. He was elected a Fellow of the Royal Society in 2022.

He was awarded the University of Cambridge, Pilkington Teaching Prize in 2005 and the IEEE TC-PAMI Everingham Prize in 2017. He received best paper awards at the European Conference on Computer Vision in 1992 and 1996, and the British Machine Vision Conference in 1994, 1997, 2000, 2004 and 2020.
