= Ronald A. Roy =

American engineer, physicist, and academic

Ronald A. Roy FREng FASA
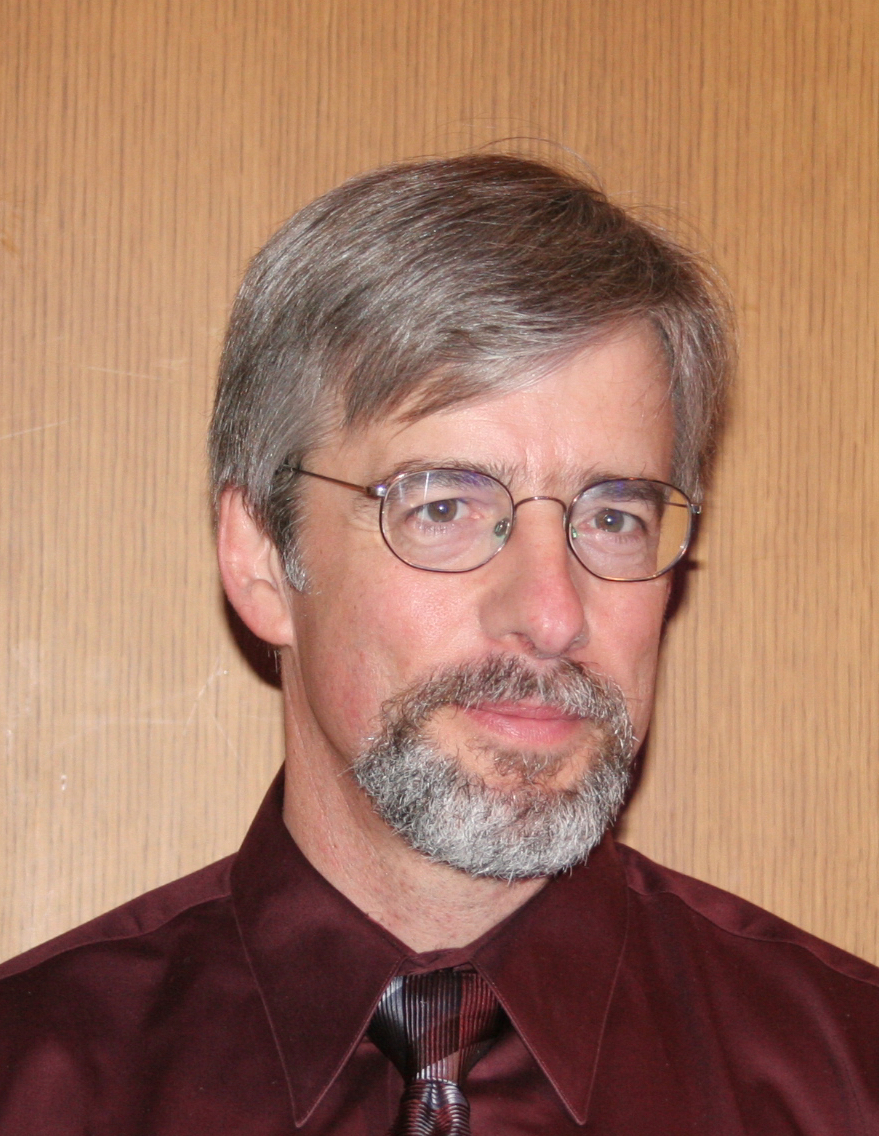
- Ronald Roy in Seoul in 2006
- Born: 10 December 1956 (age 69); Lewiston, Maine, United States
- Education: Yale University; University of Mississippi; University of Maine
- Scientific career
- Fields: mechanical engineering biomedical engineering physical acoustics ultrasonics acousto-optics bubble acoustics cavitation
- Workplaces: University of Maine; University of Oxford; Harris Manchester College; Balliol College; Boston University; University of Washington; University of Mississippi; Yale University
- Doctoral advisor: Robert E. Apfel

Ronald A. Roy FREng FASA (born 10 December 1956) is an American engineer, physicist, and academic, who is an expert in physical acoustics and its applications to ultrasonics, biomedical acoustics, acousto-optics, cavitation, and bubble swarm acoustics.

== Overview ==
Roy is professor emeritus of mechanical engineering and a former head of the Department of Engineering Science (i.e. dean of engineering) at the University of Oxford, where he served for 12 years as the chaired professor of mechanical engineering from 2013 while serving as professorial fellow at Harris Manchester College. Prior to joining Oxford, he spent 17 years as a professor of mechanical engineering at Boston University where, while serving as department chair from 2007 to 2013, he oversaw the successful merger of the former Department of Aerospace and Mechanical Engineering, and the Department of Manufacturing Engineering. Roy also held research posts at the University of Washington's Applied Physics Laboratory (1991–1996) and the University of Mississippi’s National Center for Physical Acoustics (1988–1991). In 2025 he took up the post of Director of Research and Strategic Partnerships for the Maine College of Engineering and Computing at the University of Maine.

Roy is a Fellow of the UK Royal Academy of Engineering, and the Acoustical Society of America, and served as the society's vice president in 2016–2017. During 2006–2007, he spent a year at Balliol College (University of Oxford) as the 65th George Eastman Distinguished Visiting professor. He served on the editorial boards for the Journal of the Acoustical Society of America and IEEE-UFFC and was editor in chief of Acoustic Research Letters Online (now JASA-EL). He has engaged industry by way of numerous consultancies and service on directorial and advisory boards, most recently First Light Fusion, an Oxford spin-out focused on novel technology for fusion energy production.

== Education ==
Professor Roy completed his B.S. degree in engineering physics in 1981 at the University of Maine, where he concentrated in electrical engineering. In 1984, he earned his M.S. degree in physics (with thesis) from the University of Mississippi. In 1985 and 1987, he earned M.Phil. and Ph.D. degrees in engineering and applied science from Yale University, where he concentrated in mechanical engineering. In 2006, he was conferred the Oxford MA ad eundem, by special resolution.

== Awards and honours ==
- 1993 Elected Fellow of the Acoustical Society of America
- 1995 University of Washington College of Ocean & Fisheries Sciences Distinguished Research Award
- 2006 65th George Eastman Distinguished Visiting Professor, University of Oxford, UK
- 2008 Francis Crowe Society Distinguished Engineer Medal
- 2010 Helmholtz-Rayleigh Interdisciplinary Silver Medal, Acoustical Society of America
- 2012 Edward T. Bryand Distinguished Engineering Award
- 2016 Elected Vice President of the Acoustical Society of America
- 2016 Honorary Professor of Biomedical Engineering, Hong Kong Polytechnic University
- 2025 Elected Fellow of the Royal Academy of Engineering

== Personal life ==
Roy is married to Ms Nancy S. Roy. He has 2 children and 1 grandchild.
