= Simukai Utete =

Zimbabwean robotics scientist

- Education: DPhil in robotics from Oxford University
- Occupation: Robotics Scientist
- Employer: African Institute for Mathematical Sciences
- Known for: Robotics Research

Simukai Utete is a Zimbabwean robotics scientist, and was the academic director of the South Africa branch of the African Institute for Mathematical Sciences (AIMS). Her work has focused on multi-robot systems and data fusion.

== Early life and education ==
Utete attended Balliol College at Oxford University, after being awarded a Rhodes Scholarship. She holds a DPhil in Robotics (Engineering Science).

== Career ==
For four years, Utete led the Mobile Intelligent Autonomous Systems (MIAS) field robotics group at the Council for Scientific and Industrial Research in Pretoria.

In 1994, she published Routing for Reliability in Decentralised Sensing Networks in collaboration with H.F. Durrant—Whyte. This was a conference paper that focused on management and configuration in decentralized sensing networks. The paper demonstrated that it was possible to overcome local failures and reallocate tasks while still maintaining system constraints.

In 1998, she published Local Information Processing for Decision Making in Decentralised Sensing Networks, a conference paper focused on the use of local information processing in decision making in decentralized sensor systems. The article described the problems that can arise from this system when the nodes receive inconsistent information.

In 1999, in collaboration with Billur Barshan and Birsel Ayrulu, she published Voting as Validation in Robot Programming, which investigated the use of voting as a conflict resolution and information extraction technique. The paper argued that a single outcome should be encouraged when data sources from different sensors contradicted each other, rather than relying on an abstract average. This outcome can be achieved through voting, here referring to a data fusion technique.

She later became the academic director for AIMS South Africa, where she helped to organize the 2021 AIMS Mathematics in Industry Study Group. This was a five-day workshop where academics and graduate students collaborated with industry representatives to address research concerns submitted by local industries.
