= Oxa =

English autonomous vehicle software company

- Formerly: Oxbotica
- Type: Scale-up
- Industry: Autonomous vehicles
- Founded: 2014
- Founder: Paul Newman; Ingmar Posner
- Headquarters: Oxford, England
- Area served: UK, Europe, US, Asia
- Key people: Paul Newman, CEO
- Products: SaaS
- Number of employees: 400 (2025)
- Website: oxa.tech

Oxa (formerly Oxbotica) is an autonomous vehicle software company, headquartered in Oxfordshire, England, and founded by Paul Newman and Ingmar Posner.

== History ==
In 2013, Newman and Posner led the RobotCar UK project as part of Oxford University's Department of Engineering Science Mobile Robotics Group. RobotCar became the first autonomous vehicle on UK roads.

In 2014, the pair used the newly developed technology to found Oxbotica.

Oxbotica raised $18 million (£14 million) in 2018, backed by the IP Group, Parkwalk Advisors, and AXA XL. In 2018, Uber's former EMEA business head, Fraser Robinson, was appointed to the board of directors.

In May 2019, Ozgur Tohumcu replaced Dr Graeme Smith as Oxbotica's CEO. Also in 2019, the company opened an office in Toronto, Canada.

In January 2021, Oxbotica announced it had raised $47 million in a Series B round.

In August 2021, the company achieved a safety landmark as the first company to have its autonomy safety case assessed by BSI (British Standards Institution) against the requirements of the UK Code of Practice 2019, PAS 1881:2020 and PAS 1883:2020, certifying the safety conformity of its autonomous vehicle trials and testing. The assessment was completed as part of Project Endeavour, the UK's first multi-city demonstration of autonomous vehicle services and capability.

In December 2021, Gavin Jackson was named CEO.

In January 2023, the company raised $140 million in a Series C round.

In May 2023, the company changed its name to Oxa.

Oxa raised $103 million (£77 million) in March 2026, including $50 million from the UK National Wealth Fund. Nvidia's venture capital division, NVentures, also invested in the Series D funding round, along with existing Oxa shareholders IP Group, Australian pension fund Hostplus, and BP Ventures, a division of the UK oil company.

== Technology ==
Oxa designs software and hardware for the conversion of industrial vehicles into autonomous ones.

Its software is both vehicle- and platform-agnostic, with no dependence on external infrastructure such as GPS. It can be deployed in any environment and on any terrain. In addition to underground uses, the technology is also useful in natural canyons and forests, where GPS signals are weak or non-existent, but also in "urban canyons" — cities with tall buildings that obstruct GPS signals for proper navigation.

== Public deployments ==
The LUTZ Pathfinder pod had its first public demonstration in February 2015 in Milton Keynes. The Government-funded project was designed to ensure that autonomous vehicles would comply with the Highway Code. The pod featured autonomous control software from Oxbotica, including 19 sensors, cameras, radar and Lidar.

As part of the GATEway Project in 2017, Oxbotica trialled seven autonomous shuttle buses in Greenwich, navigating a two-mile riverside path near London's O2 Arena on a route that is also used by pedestrians and cyclists. Oxbotica ran the UK's first trial of autonomous grocery deliveries that year, with British online supermarket Ocado in London, as the next step in the GATEway Project.

In 2018, Oxbotica deployed its autonomous vehicle software at London's Gatwick Airport, which subsequently became the first airport in the world to trial an autonomous shuttle service. The electric-powered vehicles transported staff via airside roads between the airport's North and South terminals. An airside trial of Oxbotica's autonomous driving technology was then successfully completed at Heathrow Airport in partnership with IAG Cargo, the first airside trial of an autonomous vehicle at a UK airport. The Oxbotica-designed CargoPod ran autonomously along a cargo route around the airside perimeter for three weeks.

As part of the UK Centre for Connected and Autonomous Vehicles-funded DRIVEN project, Oxbotica is developing and deploying a fleet of Ford Fusion autonomous vehicles running in both London and Oxford on public roads, and in conjunction with its consortium partners, running real-time insurance. AXA XL is partnering with Oxbotica on the development of smart insurance products using Oxbotica's autonomy technology to improve road safety.

In 2018, Oxbotica announced a partnership with London private taxi firm Addison Lee to develop and deploy autonomous taxis in the city of London by 2021. A 3D street mapping exercise was conducted in London's Canary Wharf.

In 2019, Oxbotica deployed a fleet of their autonomous technology within Ford Mondeo cars on public roads in Stratford, London to test their use in city environments. The £13.2 million project is in collaboration with The DRIVEN Project to develop self-driving cars.

== Awards ==
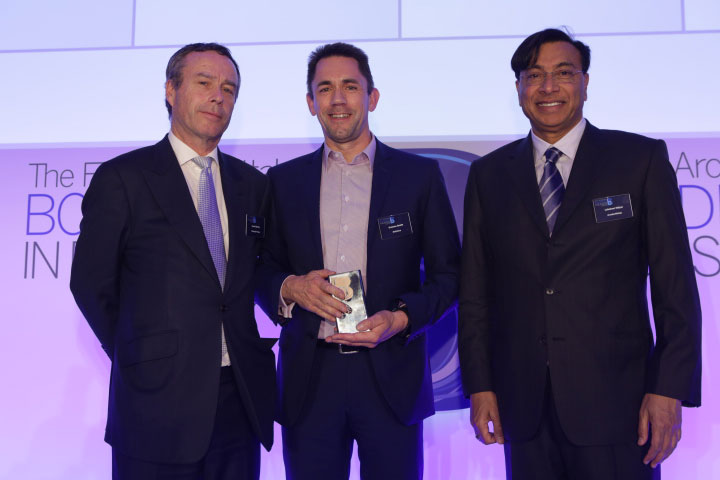
Oxbotica won the Financial Times Boldness in Business Award in 2017.

2019

- Royal Academy of Engineering Silver Medal - Paul Newman

2017

- Financial Times ArcelorMittal Boldness in Business Award
- Barclays Award for Innovation

2016

- Frost & Sullivan Award, Technology Leadership for Autonomous Driving Software

== See also ==
- List of self-driving system suppliers
