= Text-free user interface =

A text-free user interface is a user interface (UI) wholly based on graphical UI techniques and without any writing. Text-free UIs are employed in areas where written language may not be understood by the user. For example, with young children, international UIs where localisation is not feasible or where users may be illiterate.
