= PowderJect =

Pharmaceutical company in England, 1993–2003

PowderJect Pharmaceuticals was a British vaccine, drug and diagnostics delivery company founded by Brian Bellhouse. They developed a needle-free injection system for delivering medications and vaccines.

In 1993, PowderJect was spun out of the University of Oxford with the help of Isis Innovation.

In 2003, the company was taken over by the American Chiron Corporation for £542 million. The company's CEO was Paul Drayson, Baron Drayson, son-in-law of the founder, Brian Bellhouse, and they received £100 million following the takeover. Drayson received £43m for his 8% holding, Bellhouse £19.5m for his 3.6% stake, and their family trusts received £41m.
