= Australian Centre for Field Robotics =

The Australian Centre for Field Robotics (ACFR) is dedicated to the research and teaching of concepts relating to intelligent autonomous systems, at The University of Sydney in NSW, Australia. Originally established as an ARC Key Centre of Teaching and Research in 1999, it now forms part of the ARC Centre of Excellence for Autonomous Systems, along with groups at the University of Technology, Sydney and the University of New South Wales.

== Research direction ==
The Centre undertakes research in a broad range of areas related to the perception, control and learning capabilities of land, air and sea-based autonomous systems. Work at the ACFR is directed to the perception and systems aspects of this larger research area, specifically:

- Perception
  - Sensor Construction and Deployment
  - Sensor Representation
  - Measurement in the presence of uncertainty
  - Decentralised fusion (DDF) of data from disparate and/or dislocated sensors
- Systems
  - Modelling of large-scale systems
  - Design

== See also ==
- University of Sydney
- University of New South Wales
- University of Technology, Sydney
- Australian Research Council
