= Savilian Professor =

Savilian Professor may refer to the following positions at the University of Oxford, England:

- Savilian Professor of Astronomy
- Savilian Professor of Geometry
