= Savilian =

Savilian may refer to:

- Henry Savile (Bible translator) (1549-1622), English scholar
  - Savilian Professor, the professorships he founded at Oxford, namely:
    - Savilian Professor of Astronomy
    - Savilian Professor of Geometry
- Member of the Savile Club
