= James Keill =

Scottish physician

James Keill (27 March 1673 – 16 July 1719) was a Scottish physician, philosopher, medical writer and translator. He was an early proponent of mathematical methods in physiology.

== Life ==
Born in Edinburgh on 27 March 1673 the son of Sarah Cockburn and Robert Keill, an Edinburgh lawyer. He was the younger brother of John Keill, and the nephew of William Cockburn. He was educated partly at home, studying under Andrew Massey and (probably) David Gregory at the University of Edinburgh, and partly on the continent, studying under Nicolas Lemery and (probably) Jean Guichard Duverney in Paris, followed by a period at Leyden University.

He applied himself to anatomy, and, moving to England, acquired a reputation by lecturing on anatomy at Oxford and Cambridge (which conferred on him the degree of MD). With the degree, but without belonging to the College of Physicians, he settled in 1703 as a physician at Northampton, where he continued for the rest of his life. He was elected a Fellow of the Royal Society in 1712.

He died unmarried on 16 July 1719 of mouth cancer, and was buried in St Giles' Church, Northampton, where a monument, with a Latin inscription, was erected to his memory by his brother John.

== Works ==
He was an active supporter of the mechanical or ‘iatro-mathematical’ school of medicine; some of his ideas derived from his brother, a mathematician. He discussed by mathematical methods, combined with experiment, several physiological problems, such as secretion, the amount of blood in the body, muscular motion, and the force of the heart. On the latter point he corrected an exaggerated estimate of Giovanni Alfonso Borelli; but his own results were not satisfactory, and were criticised by James Jurin in the Philosophical Transactions. Keill's essays were, however, esteemed. He also made a series of physiological observations on himself, after the manner of Santorio Sanctorius, published as ‘Medicina statica Britannica,’ in the third edition of his essays.

Keill's major work appeared first as ‘An Account of Animal Secretion, the Quantity of Blood in the Humane Body, and Muscular Motion,’ London, 1708; 2nd edit. enlarged under the new title of ‘Essays on several Parts of the Animal Œconomy,’ London, 1717; 3rd edit. (Latin), ‘Tentamina Medico-Physica, &c. Quibus accessit Medicina statica Britannica,’ London, 1718; 4th edit., containing in addition ‘A Dissertation concerning the Force of the Heart, by James Jurin, M.D., with Dr. Keill's Answer and Dr. Jurin's Reply; also Medicina statica Britannica, &c., explained and compared with the Aphorisms of Sanctorius, by John Quincy, M.D.,’ London, 1738. He wrote also ‘The Anatomy of the Human Body, abridged,’ London, 1698, 15th edit. 1771; ‘An Account of the Death and Dissection of John Bayles of Northampton, reputed to have been 130 years old’ (Phil. Trans. 1706, xxv. 2247); and ‘De Viribus Cordis’ (ib. 1719, xxx. 995).

== Notes ==
Attribution

This article incorporates text from a publication now in the public domain: "Keill, James". Dictionary of National Biography. London: Smith, Elder & Co. 1885–1900.
