= William Fishburn Donkin =

British astronomer and mathematician (1814–1869)

William Fishburn Donkin FRS
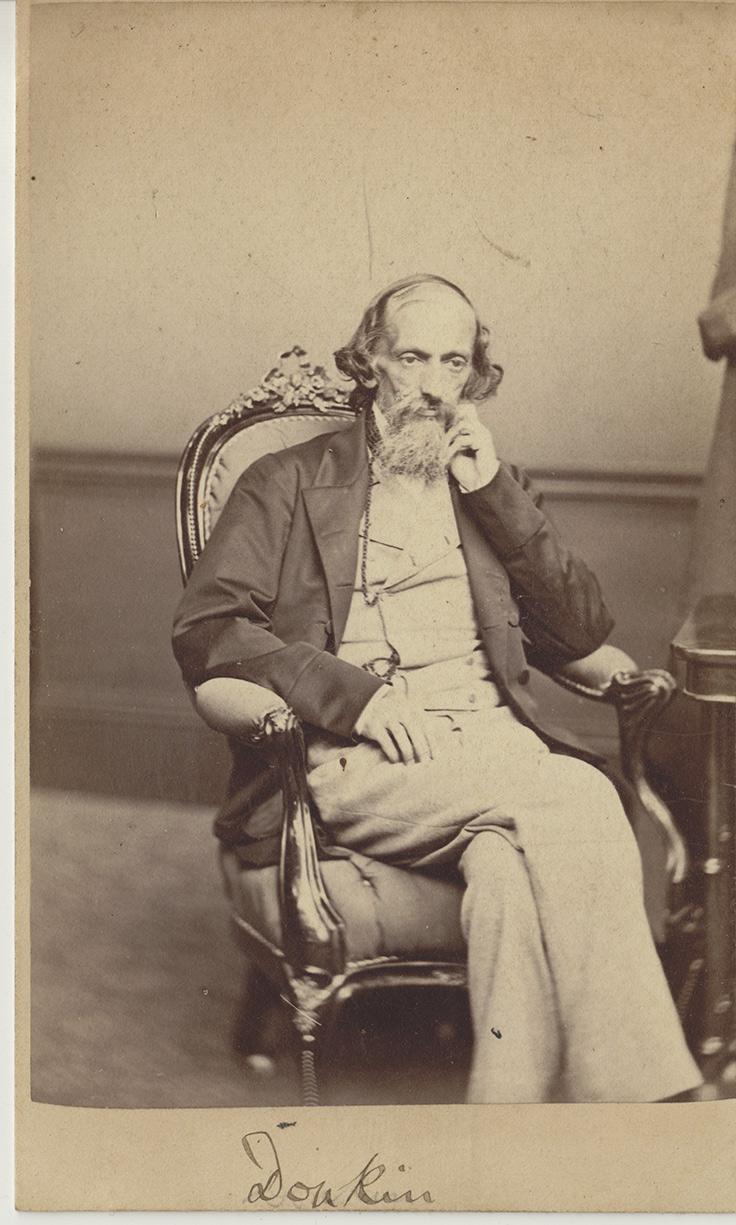
- William F. Donkin (US Naval Observatory Library)
- Born: 16 February 1814; Bishop Burton
- Died: 15 November 1869 (aged 55)
- Education: St Peter's School, York; St Edmund Hall, Oxford; University College, Oxford
- Occupation: Savilian professor of astronomy
- Known for: The Secular Acceleration of the Moon's Mean Motion

William Fishburn Donkin FRS FRAS (16 February 1814 – 15 November 1869) was a British astronomer and mathematician, Savilian Professor of Astronomy at the University of Oxford.

== Life ==
He was born at Bishop Burton, Yorkshire, on 15 February 1814. His parents were Thomas Donkin (1776–1856) and Alice née Bateman (1784–1860). Two of his uncles were Bryan Donkin and Thomas Bateman. He was educated at St Peter's School, York, and in 1832 entered St Edmund Hall, Oxford. In 1834, Donkin won a classical scholarship at University College, in 1836 he obtained a double first in classics and mathematics, and a year later he carried off the mathematical and Johnson mathematical scholarships. He proceeded B.A. 25 May 1836, and M.A. 1839. He was elected as a fellow of University College, and he continued for about six years at St Edmund Hall in the capacity of mathematical lecturer.

In 1842, Donkin was elected Savilian professor of astronomy at Oxford, in succession to George Johnson, a post which he held for the remainder of his life. Soon afterwards he was elected a Fellow of the Royal Society, and also of the Royal Astronomical Society. In 1844, he married the third daughter of the Rev. John Hawtrey of Guernsey.

Donkin's poor health compelled him to live much abroad during the latter part of his life. He died 15 November 1869.

== Works ==
There is a list of his papers, sixteen in number, in the Catalogue of Scientific Papers published by the Royal Society. Early works were an Essay on the Theory of the Combination of Observations for the Ashmolean Society, and articles on ancient Greek music for William Smith's Dictionary of Antiquities.

Between 1850 and 1860, Donkin contributed papers to the Philosophical Transactions, including one on The Equation of Laplace's Functions, and another On a Class of Differential Equations, including those which occur in Dynamical Problems.

In 1861, Donkin read a paper to the Royal Astronomical Society on The Secular Acceleration of the Moon's Mean Motion (printed in Monthly Notices, R. A. Soc., 1861). He was also a contributor to the Philosophical Magazine. In June 1850 he explained the algebra of quaternions and spatial rotation. His last paper, a Note on Certain Statements in Elementary Works concerning the Specific Heat of Gases, appeared in 1864.

In 1867 Donkin began work on Acoustics; the first volume was put to press in 1870 by Bartholomew Price, after Donkin's death. The text studies vibrations, particularly transverse vibrations of an elastic string (chapter 7), longitudinal vibrations of an elastic rod (chapter 8), and lateral vibrations of a thin elastic rod (chapter 9).

== Sources ==
- Harrison, W. J. "Donkin, William Fishburn (1814–1869)". Oxford Dictionary of National Biography (online ed.). Oxford University Press. doi:10.1093/ref:odnb/7813. (Subscription, Wikipedia Library access or UK public library membership required.)
