= Joseph Betts =

English mathematician

- Born: England
- Education: University College, Oxford
- Known for: Savilian Professor of Geometry
- Scientific career
- Fields: Mathematics
- Workplaces: University College, Oxford

Joseph Betts (born 1717/8 – burial date January 1766) was an English mathematician. He held the Savilian Chair of Geometry at the University of Oxford in 1765.

Betts was an undergraduate and Fellow of University College, Oxford, where he was a tutor of William Jones. He had previously sought election as Savilian Professor of Astronomy with the support of the Earl of Lichfield, the Earl of Halifax, and the Earl of Bute. He thanked his patrons for that failed attempt in the dedication to an engraving of the annular solar eclipse of 1 April 1764.
