= Higher education accreditation in the United Kingdom =

The UK does not operate an accreditation system in the way it is understood in the US, i.e. a university (or other institute of higher education) cannot be "accredited" or "unaccredited". Instead there is a system of quality assurance, with reviews carried out by a government-appointed agency, the Quality Assurance Agency for Higher Education (QAA), and external examiners appointed by the institutions. There is also government control over degree-awarding powers and the right to be called a university, the exact details of which vary between different countries of the UK.

Quality assurance reviews by the QAA do not directly assess the quality of courses or qualifications at an institution. Instead, they assess the systems that institutions have in place to assure the quality of their courses and qualifications. QAA reviews are a form of external peer review, being carried out by academics and administrators from other higher education institutions.

Accreditation for professional degrees is carried out by statutory or professional bodies and is awarded on a course-by-course basis.
