= Donald Blackwell =

British astronomer

Donald Eustace Blackwell (27 May 1921 – 3 December 2010) was a British astronomer, who was Savilian Professor of Astronomy at the University of Oxford from 1960 to 1988.

He studied at Sidney Sussex College, Cambridge, and was later appointed as Assistant Director of the university's Solar Physics Observatory, a position that he held from 1950 to 1960. During his career, he visited several countries to carry out astronomical investigations, including Fiji, Bolivia (twice) and Canada. He was President of the Royal Astronomical Society from 1973 to 1975. He held his Oxford professorship in conjunction with a fellowship of New College, Oxford.
