= John Keill =

Scottish mathematician

John Keill FRS
- Born: 1 December 1671; Edinburgh, Scotland
- Died: 31 August 1721 (aged 49); Oxford, England
- Education: Edinburgh University; Balliol College, Oxford
- Known for: Defending Isaac Newton
- Scientific career
- Fields: Mathematician and astronomer
- Workplaces: University of Oxford
- Academic advisors: David Gregory
- Notable students: Brook Taylor; John Theophilus Desaguliers

Notes
- He is the brother of physician James Keill.

John Keill FRS (1 December 1671 – 31 August 1721) was a Scottish mathematician, natural philosopher, and cryptographer who was an important defender of Isaac Newton.

== Biography ==
Keill was born in Edinburgh, Scotland on 1 December 1671. His father was Robert Keill, an Edinburgh lawyer. His mother was Sarah Cockburn. His brother, James Keill, became a noted physician.

Keill studied at Edinburgh University under David Gregory. In 1692, he obtained his bachelor's degree with a distinction in physics and mathematics. Keill then attended Balliol College, Oxford, obtaining an MA on 2 February 1694. After being appointed a lecturer in experimental philosophy at Hart Hall, Keill started giving lectures and performing experiments based on Newton's findings. He instructed his students on the laws of motion, the principles of hydrostatics and optics, and Newtonian propositions on light and colours.

In 1698, Keill published Examination of Dr. Burnet's Theory of the Earth. His volume contained scientific attacks on Burnet, René Descartes, Baruch Spinoza, Thomas Hobbes and Nicolas Malebranche. This publication, along with his teaching, gained Keill notice in the English academic community. In 1700, he was elected a Fellow of the Royal Society. However, after failing to get an academic appointment at Oxford in 1709, Keill left the university to seek a government position. At Hart Hall the innovatory nature of Keill's demonstrations, and his teaching, were continued after 1710 by his student John Theophilus Desaguliers. The methods both used were instrumental in popularising Newtonian ideas and making them more accessible.

In 1709, Keill was appointed treasurer of a charitable fund to resettle war refugees from the German states. He accompanied at least one group of German refugees to the British Province of New York.

In 1711, Keill accepted the position of decypherer to Anne, Queen of Great Britain. His responsibilities included explaining old manuscripts to the sovereign. In 1712, Keill returned to Oxford as Savilian Professor of Astronomy. On 9 July 1713, he was awarded the DM degree.

In his later years, Keill became involved in the controversy regarding Gottfried Leibniz's alleged plagiarisation of Newton's invention of calculus, serving as Newton's chief defender. However, Newton himself eventually grew tired of Keill as he stirred up too much trouble.

In 1717, Keill married Mary Clements, a woman 25 years his junior and the daughter of an Oxford bookbinder. The marriage created great scandal at the time as Clements was from a lower class.

On 31 August 1721, Keill died in London from a sudden illness, possibly food poisoning. It was stated in the old Dictionary of National Biography that Keill left no will. His will is referenced in the Oxford Dictionary of National Biography and is held by The National Archives. It was executed on 12 January 1720 and was proved in the Prerogative Court of Canterbury in October 1721. He spent £500 to his household furniture and plate to his wife and his books, instruments and other money in trust for his son.

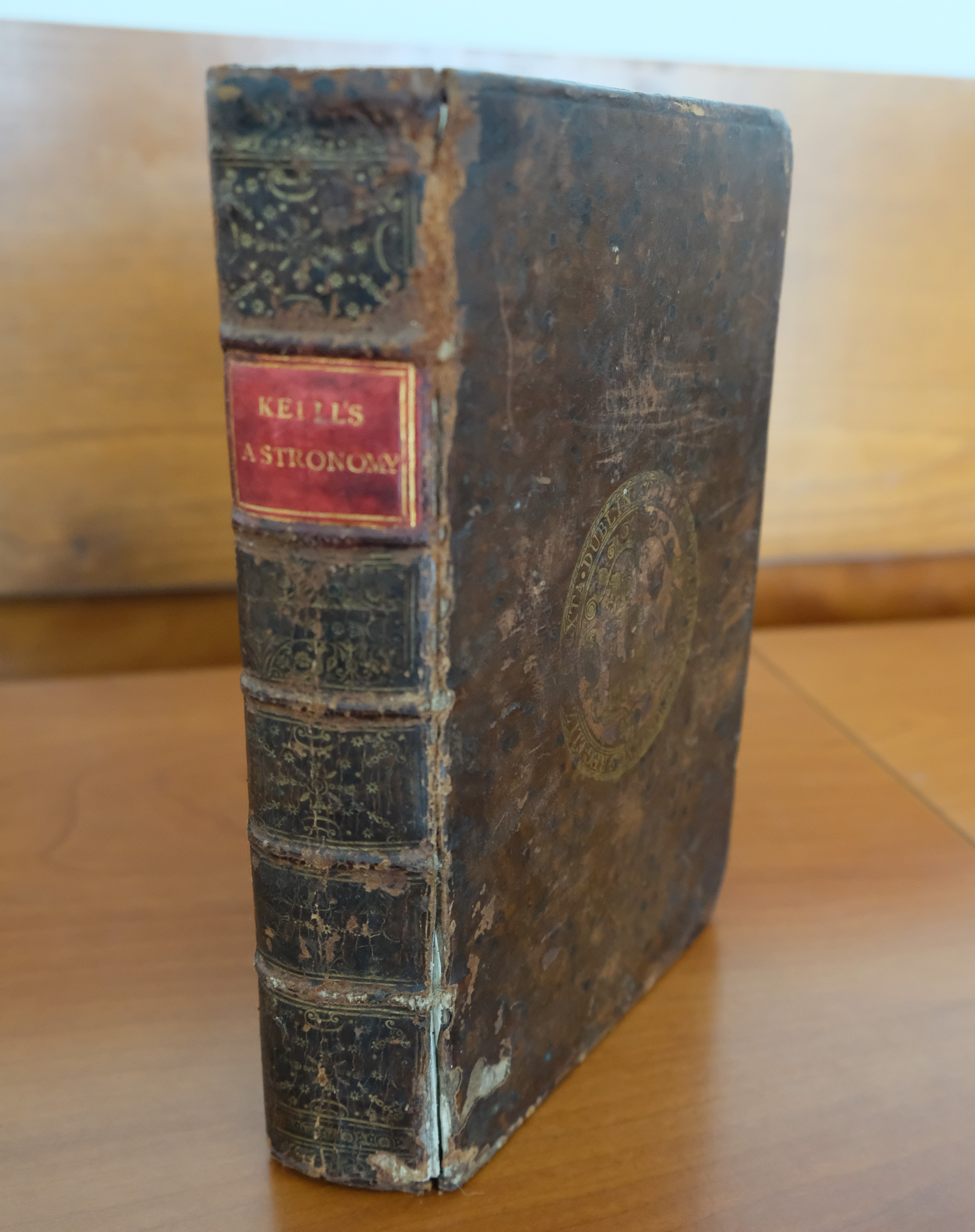
1730 copy of Keill's "An Introduction to the True Astronomy"

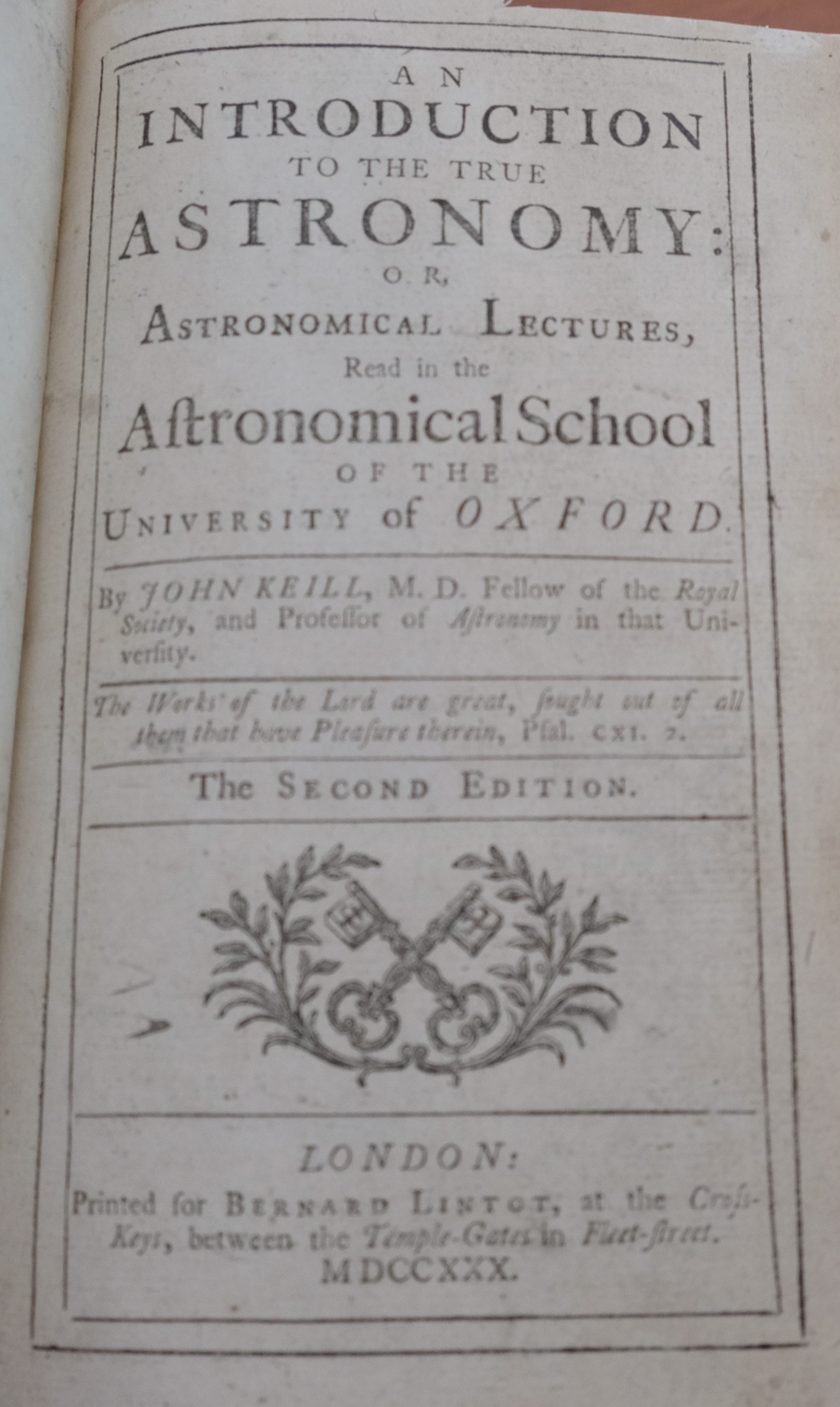
Title page to "An Introduction to the True Astronomy"

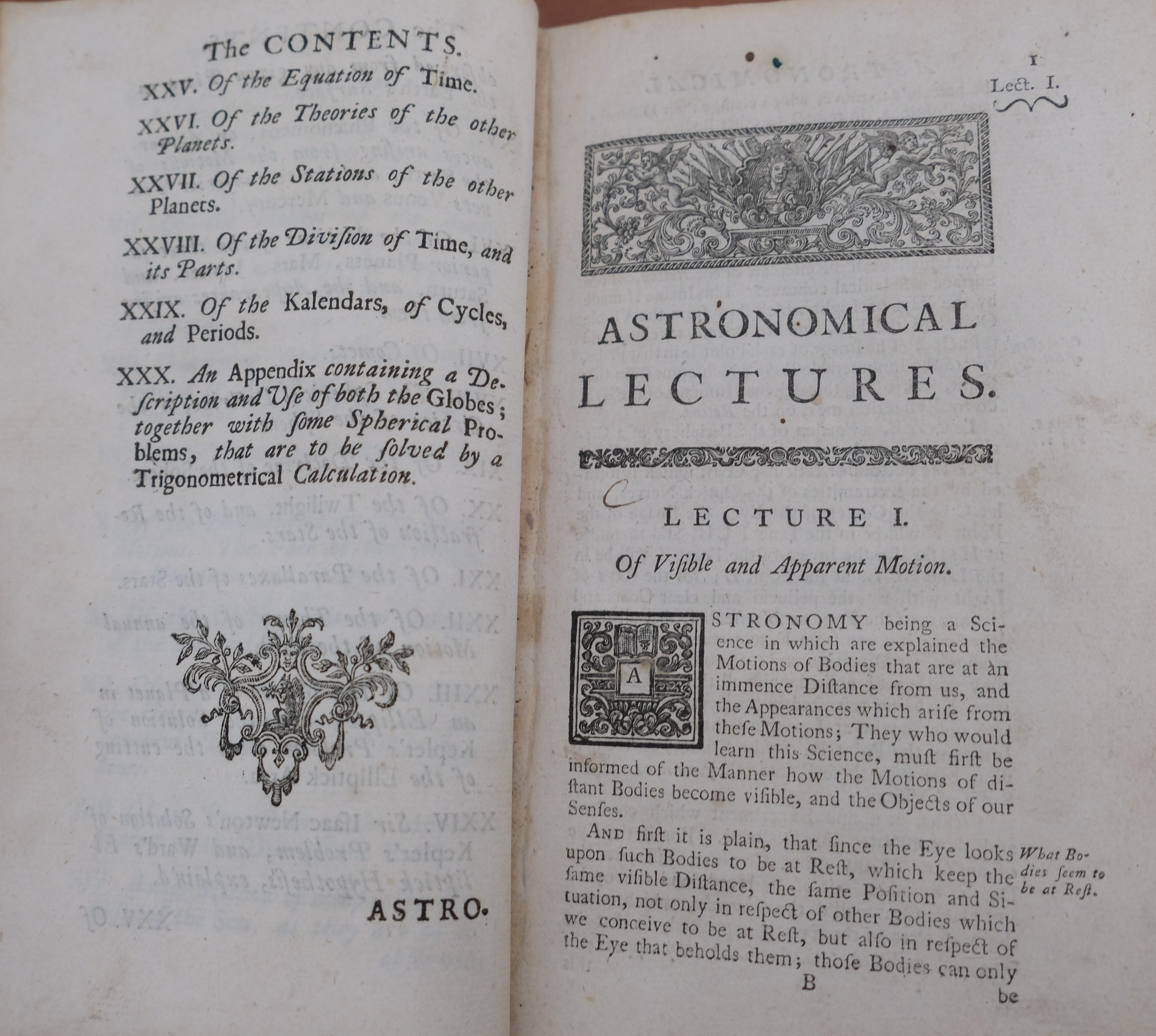
First page of "An Introduction to the True Astronomy"

== Principal publications ==
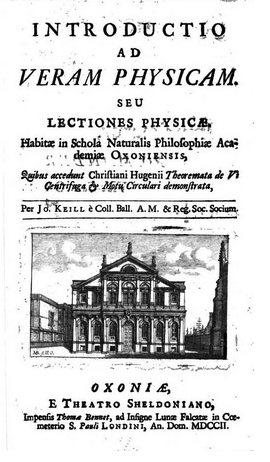

- An Examination of Dr. Burnet's Theory of the Earth. Oxford: 1698.
- Introductio ad Veram Physicam seu Lectiones Physicae. Oxford: Thomas Bennet, 1702.
- Trigonometriae Planae & Sphaericae Elementa. Oxford: Henry Clements, 1715.
- Item de Natura et Arithmetica Logarithmorum tractatus brevis. Oxford: Henry Clements, 1715.
- Introductio ad Veram Astronomiam seu Lectiones Astronomicae. Oxford: Henry Clements, 1718.

Keill's publisher at Oxford, Henry Clements, sometimes bound Keill's Trigonometriae and Logarithmorum with Federico Commandino's translation of Euclid's Elements. This volume appeared as: Euclidis Elementorum Libri Priores Sex. Oxford: Henry Clements, 1715.

After Keill's death, the Verbeek brothers collected Keill's work into a single volume. This volume appeared as: Introductiones ad veram Physicam et veram Astronomiam. Leiden: Jan en Hermanus Verbeek, 1725. This book also contained Keill's long papers De Legibus Virium Centripetarum and De Legibus Attractionis, aliisque Physices Principiis.

All of these works were very popular; they appeared in England and the Continent in many editions from many publishers, in Latin, English, and Dutch.

=== Editions ===
- Introductiones ad veram physicam et veram astronomiam (in Latin). Leiden: Johannes Verbeek & Hermanus Verbeek. 1739.
- Introduction to the true astronomy, or, astronomical lectures, read in the astronomical school of the University of Oxford (in French). Paris: Hippolyte-Louis Guérin & Jacques Guérin. 1746.
