= Stephen Peter Rigaud =

English mathematical historian and astronomer

- Born: 12 August 1774
- Died: 16 March 1839 (aged 64)
- Resting place: St James, Piccadilly, London
- Education: Exeter College, Oxford

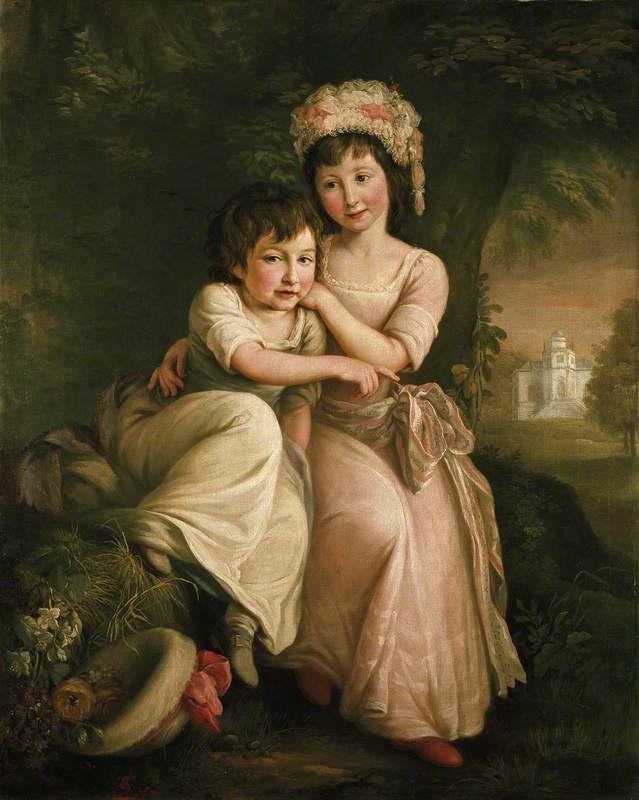
The Rigaud children by John Francis Rigaud, 1778 (Ashmolean Museum)

Stephen Peter Rigaud (12 August 1774 – 16 March 1839) FRAS was an English mathematical historian and astronomer. Rigaud was born into a French Protestant family. His father, Stephen (also known as James Stephen) Rigaud, was Observer at the Kew Observatory. The painter John Francis Rigaud, who painted a portrait of Rigaud, aged four, and his sister Mary Anne was not his uncle but other possible connections are unknown.

He was a Fellow of Exeter College, Oxford, from 1794 to 1810, held the Savilian Chair of Geometry at the University of Oxford from 1810 to 1827, and was Savilian Professor of Astronomy from 1827 to 1839. He lived at 21 Richmond Green in Richmond, Surrey (now Richmond, London) from 1815 to 1826.

"He devoted his leisure to research and authorship in the field of scientific biography. A well-informed friend has said of him, — " He had a peculiar delight in tracing the history of an invention, or illustrating the biography of those who, however eminent in their day, were in after ages known to have lived, flourished for a time, and died. To collect the materials for their lives, to throw light upon their habits, enumerate their works, and do justice to their merits, was a principal source of his amusement; and his perseverance in seeking for materials was exceeded only by the discrimination and impartiality which accompanied his researches and rendered them of permanent value."

== Published works ==
- Historical essay on the first publication of Sir Isaac Newton’s Principia (1838)
- An account of some early proposals for steam navigation (1838)
- Defence of the resolution for omitting Mr Panizzi's bibliographical notes from the catalogue of the Royal Society (1838)
- Correspondence of scientific men of the seventeenth century: including letters of Barrow, Flamsteed, Wallis and Newton, printed from the originals in the collection of the Honorable the Earl of Macclesfield (1841)

== Death and legacy ==
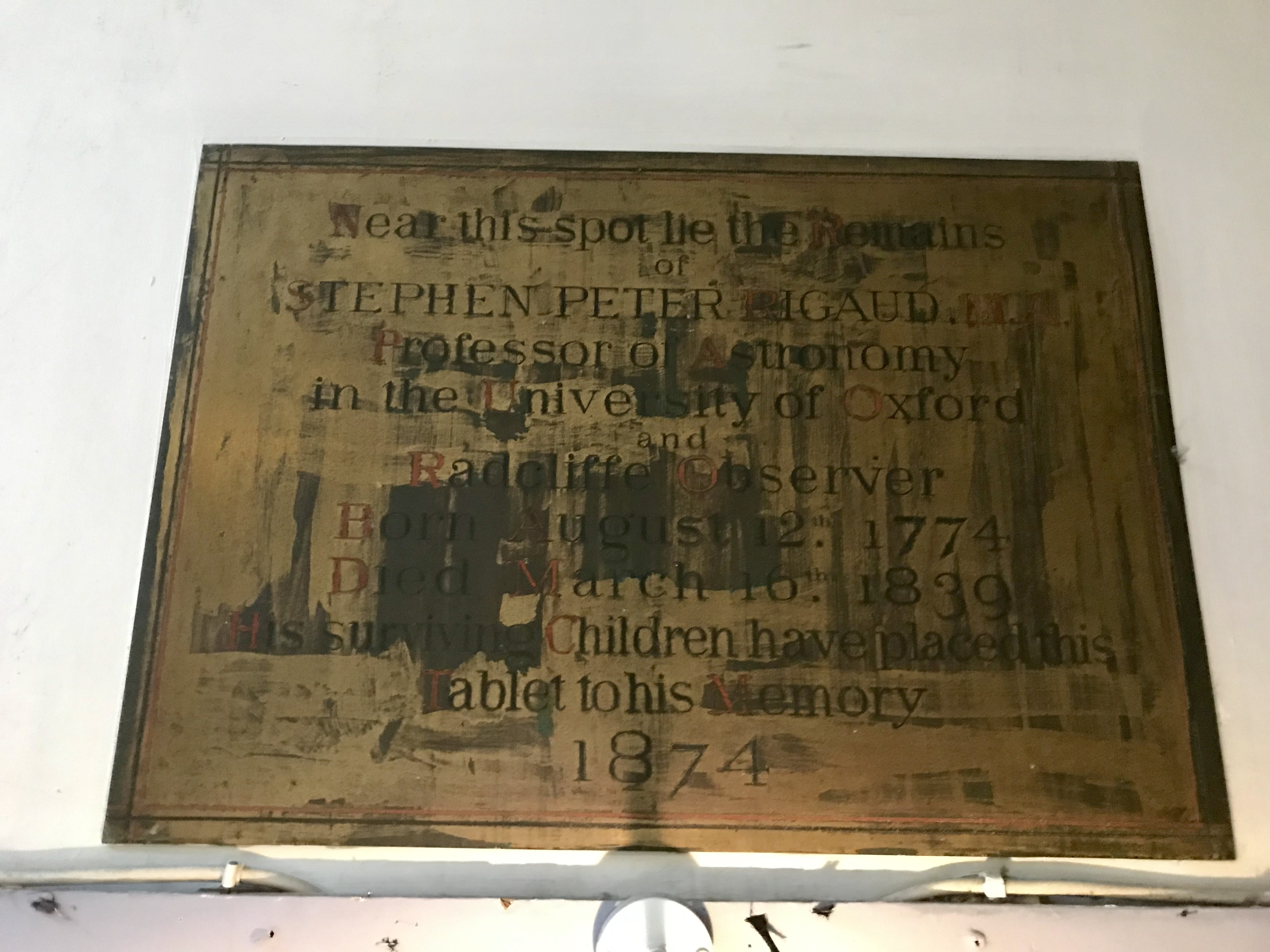
A memorial to Stephen Peter Rigaud in St James's Church, Piccadilly

He died on 16 March 1839 and was buried at St James, Piccadilly, London, where a memorial to him lies in the church. His eldest son, Stephen Jordan Rigaud (1816–1859), was an English clergyman and schoolmaster who became Bishop of Antigua.

Some of his large book collection, concerning astronomy, mathematics and physics, was purchased by the Radcliffe Observatory in Oxford. Some of the remaining materials were presented to the Bodleian Library in 1935 and some were sold at auction. This collection at the Bodleian contains 840 books. The theological, classical and miscellaneous portion of his library was sold at auction in London by R. H. Evans on 6 August 1839 (and two following days); a copy of the catalogue is held at Cambridge University Library (shelfmark Munby.c.145(11)).
