= Edward Bernard =

English scholar and Savilian professor of astronomy

Edward Bernard (1638 – 12 January 1697) was an English scholar and Savilian professor of astronomy at the University of Oxford, from 1673 to 1691.

== Life ==
He was born at Paulerspury, Northamptonshire. He was educated at Merchant Taylors' School and St John's College, Oxford, where he was a scholar in 1655; he became a Fellow in 1658, and graduated M.A. in 1662.

He began to teach astronomy as deputy to Christopher Wren, then Savilian professor. This was from 1669, the year in which Wren became Surveyor-General of the King's Works. Eventually Wren was too busy, and resigned the chair.

In 1673 he became Savilian professor, Fellow of the Royal Society, and chaplain to Peter Mews. In 1676 he went to Paris, as tutor to Henry FitzRoy, 1st Duke of Grafton and George FitzRoy, 1st Duke of Northumberland. From the 1670s he built up good contacts with European scholars. He corresponded with Hiob Ludolf, and met his nephew Heinrich Wilhelm Ludolf in Oxford. He visited Pierre-Daniel Huet, and corresponded with Jean Mabillon and Pasquier Quesnel.

He observed the comet of 1680 and corresponded about it with John Flamsteed. In 1691 he became rector of Brightwell in Oxfordshire.

His biography was written by his friend Thomas Smith.

He died in Oxford on 12 January 1697, and was buried four days later in St John's College chapel.

== Works ==
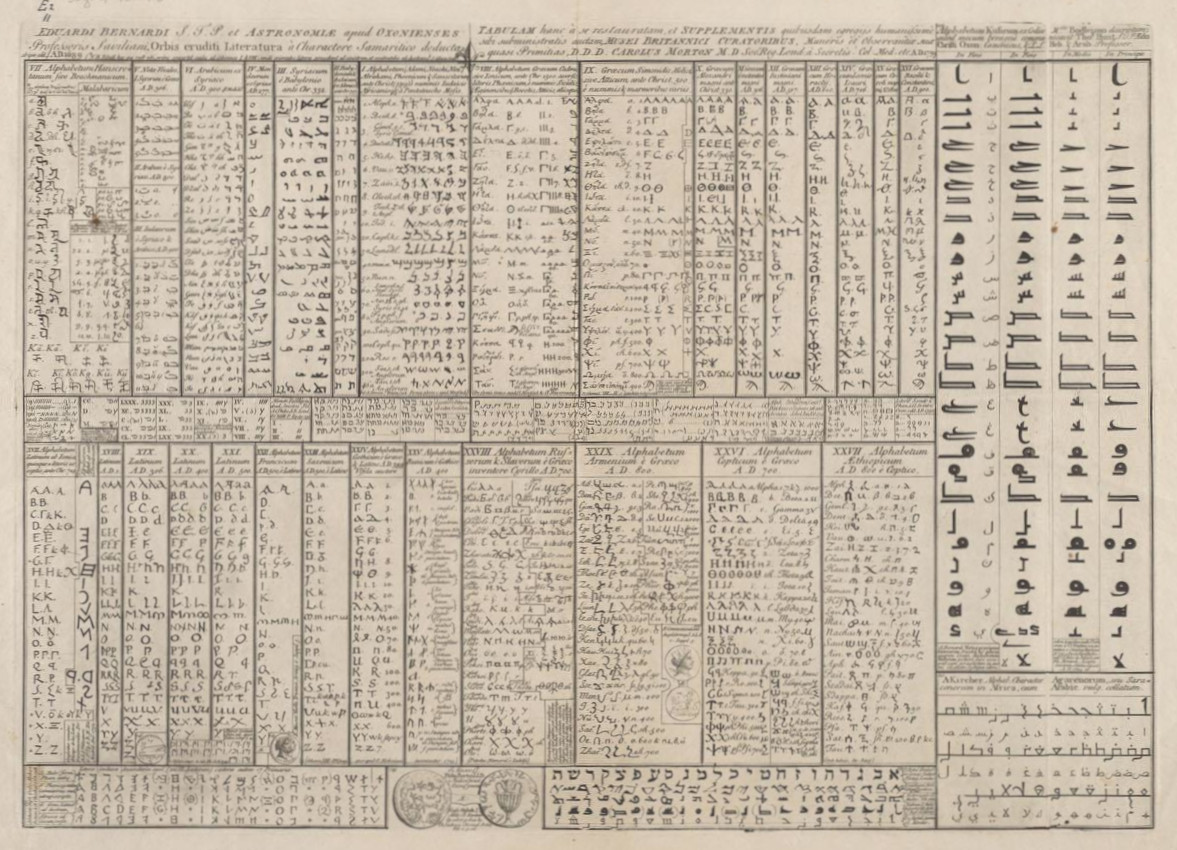
Charles Morton's 1759 updated version of Bernard's "Orbis eruditi", comparing all known alphabets as of 1689.

He spent much time on manuscripts of Apollonius of Perga, travelling to Leiden to look at the manuscript legacies of Joseph Scaliger and Levinus Warner in 1669, and working on Arabic texts in the Bodleian Library. He returned to the Netherlands more than two decades later, to purchase at auction items from the library of Jacobus Golius, on behalf of Narcissus Marsh. In parallel, he began to edit the works of Josephus in the 1680s. The geometrical work remained fragmentary, while the Josephus edition was heavily annotated but incomplete. Clement Barksdale circulated some doggerel about it: "Savilian Bernard's a right learned man;/Josephus he will finish when he can." His transcriptions and translations were later used by Edmund Halley in his translation of Apollonius.

Much of Bernard's scholarly work remained as book annotations, and came back to the Bodleian when it purchased those books from his library after his death.

De mensuris et ponderibus antiquis (1688), on ancient weights and measures, first was an appendix to a work of Edward Pococke, and then published separately in an expanded version. With Humphrey Hody and Henry Aldrich he issued an edition of Aristeas. The Orbis Eruditi was a table of many alphabets.

His Catalogi librorum manuscriptorum Angliæ et Hiberniæ in unum collecti (Oxford, 1697), colloquially "Bernard's Catalogue", was a catalogue of manuscripts in British and Irish libraries, and served as a major tool for scholars. Humfrey Wanley assisted him with this compilation.

Recent sources claim that his assertion that tenth-century Egyptian astronomer Ibn Yunis used a pendulum for time measurement, predating Galileo, has no basis in fact.
