= John Bainbridge (astronomer) =

English astronomer and mathematician

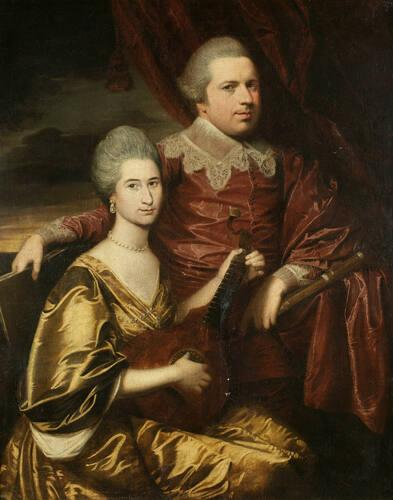
- Bainbridge (right) and his daughter (left), painted by Peter Lely
- Born: 1582; Ashby-de-la-Zouch, Leicestershire
- Died: 3 November 1643 (aged 60–61); Oxford
- Education: Free Grammar School; Emmanuel College, Cambridge
- Known for: Savilian Professor of Astronomy at Oxford University
- Scientific career
- Fields: Astronomy

John Bainbridge (1582 – 3 November 1643) was an English astronomer and mathematician.

== Life ==
Bainbridge was born at Ashby-de-la-Zouch, in Leicestershire to Robert and Anne (née Everard) Bainbridge.

He attended the Free Grammar School in Ashby-de-la-Zouch and then became a student at Emmanuel College, Cambridge. He returned to Ashby where he practiced as a physician for some years, kept a school and studied astronomy. Having been removed to London, he was admitted (6 November 1618) a licentiate of the college of physicians, and was noticed due to a publication concerning the comet of 1618.

In 1618, he became a member of the Puritan group of scholars known as the Gresham Circle. In 1619, Sir Henry Savile (Bible translator) (1549–1622) elected him as the first Savilian Professor of Astronomy at Oxford University. Bainbridge was incorporated of Merton College and became, in 1631 and 1635 respectively, junior and senior reader of Linacre's lectures.

Bainbridge was a puritan.

He died at Oxford on 3 November 1643. He was a friend of Christopher Heydon, the writer on astrology; and also of John Greaves, his successor to both the Savilian chair and Linacre's lectures.

== Works ==
He wrote An Astronomical Description of the late Comet (1619); Canicularia (1648); and translated Proclus' De Sphaera, and Ptolemy's De Planetarum Hypothesibus (1620). Several manuscript works by him exist in the Library of Trinity College, Dublin.
