= John Festing =

English clergyman

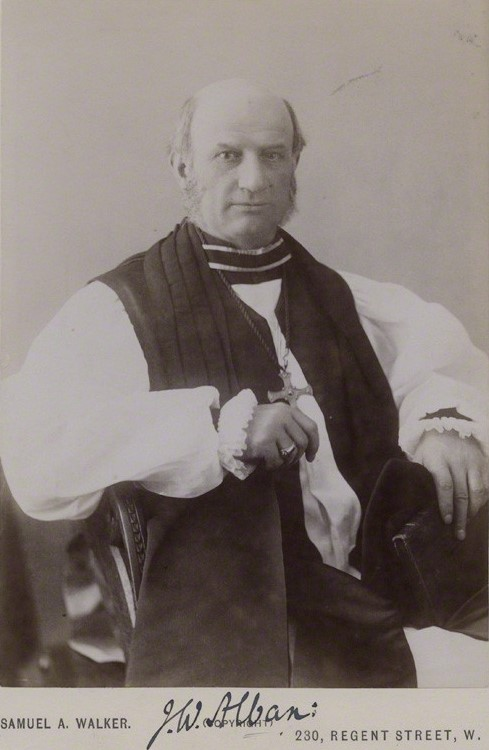
John Wogan Festing, Bishop of St Albans

John Wogan Festing (13 August 1837 in Stourton, England – 28 December 1902) was an English clergyman who was Bishop of St Albans from 1890 to 1902.

== Life ==
Festing was the son of Richard Grindall Festing, of Westminster, and Eliza Mammatt, daughter of Edward Mammatt. He was born in 1837 at Brook House in Stourton, Somerset (now in Wiltshire) and educated at King's School, Bruton and King's College School, London. His younger brother was Major-General Edward R. Festing (1839–1912), a Royal Engineer and chemist who became the first Director of the Science Museum in London.

Festing received a BA degree from Trinity College, Cambridge in 1860. He was ordained deacon in 1860, and priest the following year, and subsequently served as curate of Christ Church, Westminster, London, from 1860 to 1873. In 1873, he became vicar of St Luke's Church, Berwick Street, close to Seven Dials, a parish regarded at the time as demanding due to its poor neighbourhood. After five years, he was on 19 May 1878 appointed vicar of Christ Church, Albany Street, a large parish responsible for several church schools. In 1887, he became rural dean of St Pancras. On 26 June 1888, he became prebendary of Brondesbury in St Paul's Cathedral.

His final clerical appointment was as Lord Bishop of St Albans on 24 June 1890, to which he was recommended by Dr. Henry Liddon, a fellow high churchman. Festing was not well known, and the appointment was unexpected, and apparently not one he himself had wished, as he regarded himself as a poor preacher. The diocese had been created in 1877, had only had one bishop, and was not well established. It covered a large area in the two counties of Essex and Hertfordshire, had a comparably small income, and there was no residence. In a contemporary obituary, he was described as a ″businesslike and energetic Bishop of a very difficult diocese″, who was a "diligent student of theological science" and a ″quiet and sympathetic friend to his clergy″.

Festing received a DD degree in 1890. He was President of the Universities' Mission to Central Africa (1892–1902).

Festing was unmarried, and his house was kept for him by his sister. In early October 1902 he was reported to have been seized by angina pectoris, and he died at his residence two months later on 28 December 1902.

He was buried at St Albans Cathedral in Hertfordshire.

Religious titles
Preceded by Thomas Legh Claughton	Bishop of St Albans; 1890–1902	Succeeded by Edgar Jacob
