= Thomas Legh Claughton =

British academic, poet and clergyman

The Right Reverend Thomas Legh Claughton
- Bishop of St Albans
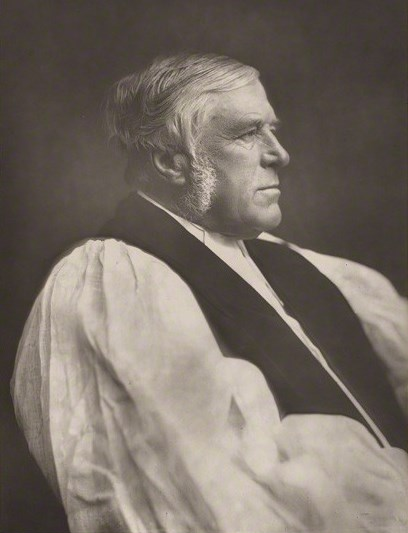
- Church: Church of England
- Diocese: Diocese of St Albans
- Installed: 1877
- Predecessor: Himself (as Bishop of Rochester)
- Successor: John Festing
- Other posts: Bishop of Rochester; 1867–1877; Oxford Professor of Poetry; 1852–1857

Orders
- Ordination: 1834
- Consecration: c. 1867

Personal details
- Born: 6 November 1808 Haydock Lodge, Winwick
- Died: 25 July 1892 (aged 83) Danbury Palace, Essex
- Buried: St Albans Cathedral
- Denomination: Anglican
- Residence: Danbury Palace, Essex
- Parents: Thomas Claughton MP & Maria
- Spouse: Hon Julia Ward
- Children: Sir Gilbert Claughton, Bt; Amelia, Duchess of Argyll; Revd Thomas Claughton; Hon Mrs Ronald Campbell
- Profession: Academic; poet
- Education: Trinity College, Oxford

Thomas Legh Claughton (6 November 1808 – 25 July 1892) was a British academic, poet, and clergyman. He was professor of poetry at Oxford University from 1852 to 1857; Bishop of Rochester; and the first Bishop of St Albans.

== Biography ==
Claughton was born at Haydock Lodge in Haydock, then in Lancashire. He was the son of Lancashire MP Thomas Claughton and his wife, Maria. Educated at The King's School, Chester and Rugby School, he was admitted in 1826 to Trinity College, Oxford, where he took a first in Literae Humaniores in 1831.

Remaining at Oxford, he held the post of select preacher to the University four times between 1841 and 1868 and from 1852 to 1857 he held the office of Professor of Poetry.

In 1836 he served as external examiner for the final examination for the degree of B.A. at the University of Durham alongside George Johnson (priest). This makes him one of the first two external examiners to serve in the UK.

Ordained in 1834, Claughton was assigned no cure until 1841, when he was appointed vicar of Kidderminster. This post he held for 26 years and was widely acclaimed for his work. In April 1867, Claughton was nominated Bishop of Rochester on the recommendation of Lord Derby, for whose installation as Chancellor of Oxford Claughton had written an ode.

In 1877, the Diocese of St Albans was created. Essentially land north of the Thames in the counties of Essex and Hertfordshire, previously ministered under Claughton's see, the Diocese of Rochester, formed the new diocese. Possibly as he already resided in the newly created Diocese, Claughton chose to become the first Bishop of St Albans, a post which he held until 1890.

== Family ==
Claughton married the Honourable Julia Susannah Ward, eldest daughter of William Humble Ward, 10th Baron Ward, and had five sons and four daughters:

- Amelia Maria Claughton (1843–1894), who married 1st Augustus Henry Archibald Anson and 2nd George John Douglas Campbell, 8th Duke of Argyll
- Hyacinthe Anne Claughton (1844–1845)
- William Claughton (1845–1860)
- The Rev. Canon Thomas Legh Claughton (1846–1915), a clergyman who married Henrietta Louisa Horatia Mildmay, granddaughter of Sir Henry St John-Mildmay Bt MP
- Katharine Susannah Claughton (1848–1934), who married Ronald George Elidor Campbell, son of John Campbell, 2nd Earl Cawdor
- The Rev. Piers Leopold Claughton (1850–1939), a clergyman
- Lucy Ellinor Claughton (1852–1939)
- Robert Dudley Claughton (1854–1855)
- Sir Gilbert Henry Claughton Bt (1856–1921), a businessman and politician

From his enthronement as 98th Bishop of Rochester to his resignation from the bishopric of St Albans in 1890, Claughton resided at Danbury Palace (near Chelmsford), where he died. It was a distinguished occupancy as his elder daughter, Amelia, married (for her second time) the Duke of Argyll at a ceremony at the Palace. He is buried in St Albans Cathedral.

His widow died at the Priory, Dudley, on 28 May 1902, aged 84.

== Selected works ==
- "Voyages of Discovery to the Polar Regions" (1829), poem – winner of the Newdigate prize for 1829
- Questions on the Collects, Epistles, and Gospels (1853–57), 2 vols.

Church of England titles
Preceded by Joseph Wigram	Bishop of Rochester; 1867–1877	Succeeded by Anthony Thorold
New diocese	Bishop of St Albans; 1877–1890	Succeeded by John Festing
