= Abraham Robertson =

Scottish mathematician and astronomer

- Born: 4 November 1751; Duns, Berwickshire, Scotland
- Died: 4 December 1826 (aged 75); Radcliffe Observatory, Oxford, Oxfordshire, England

Abraham or Abram Robertson FRS (4 November 1751 – 4 December 1826), was a Scottish mathematician and astronomer. He held the Savilian Chair of Geometry at the University of Oxford from 1797 to 1809.

Robertson was born at Duns, Berwickshire, the son of Abraham Robertson, “a man of humble station”. He attended school at Great Ryle in Northumberland, and later at Duns. At age 24, he moved to London, he had hopes of travelling to the East Indies, but his patron died. During the 1770s, Robertson completed a Bachelor of Arts and Master in Arts.

In 1795, the Royal Society elected him a fellow in recognition of his work on conic sections.

In 1792, Robertson published Sectionum conicarum libri septem.
