= George Johnson (priest) =

British clergyman and academic

George Henry Sacheverell Johnson FRS (1808 – 5 November 1881) was a British clergyman and academic who was Dean of Wells and a professor at the University of Oxford.

== Life and career ==
Johnson studied at The Queen's College, Oxford, winning a college scholarship, the Ireland scholarship and the university mathematics scholarship. He matriculated there in 1825, aged 17, graduating B.A. in 1829 with a first-class degree, and M.A. in 1833. He was a Fellow of the college from 1829 to 1855.

Johnson was ordained into the Church of England in 1834 and elected as a Fellow of the Royal Society in 1838. He was appointed Savilian Professor of Astronomy in 1839, although his lack of astronomical knowledge led to the separation of the chair from the post of Radcliffe Observer. In 1842, he changed professorships to become White's Professor of Moral Philosophy, a post he held for three years. He advocated reform of Oxford and its colleges, an unpopular stance which he believed scuppered his chances of becoming Provost (head) of his college, although he was appointed as a commissioner under the Oxford University Act 1854. In 1854, Johnson was appointed Dean of Wells, where his time was marred by a dispute about his unpopular decision to hold a parish position in Wells in addition to the deanery to supplement his income. He published Optical Investigations (1835), a book of sermons in 1857 and Science and Natural Religion: a Sermon (which went to two editions).

In 1836 he served as external examiner for the final examination for the degree of B.A. at the University of Durham alongside Thomas Legh Claughton. This makes him one of the first two external examiners to serve in the UK.

Church of England titles
Preceded by Richard Jenkyns	Dean of Wells; 1854–1881	Succeeded by Edward Plumptre
