= Savilian Professor of Geometry =

Mathematics professorship at the University of Oxford

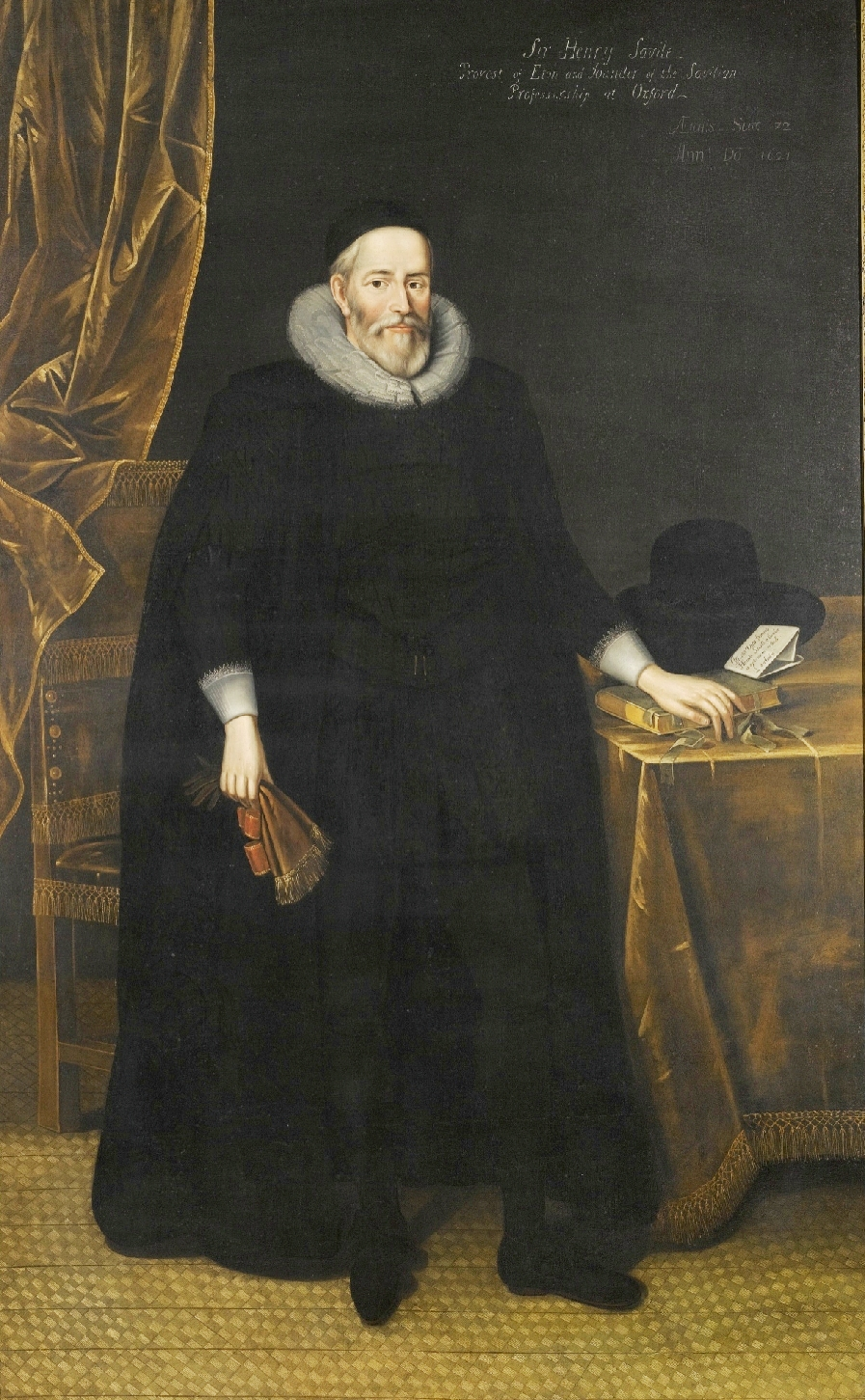
Sir Henry Savile, founder of the professorship

The position of Savilian Professor of Geometry was established at the University of Oxford in 1619. It was founded (at the same time as the Savilian Professorship of Astronomy) by Sir Henry Savile, a mathematician and classical scholar who was Warden of Merton College, Oxford, and Provost of Eton College, reacting to what has been described by one 20th-century mathematician as "the wretched state of mathematical studies in England" at that time. He appointed Henry Briggs as the first professor. Edward Titchmarsh (professor 1931–63) said when applying that he was not prepared to lecture on geometry, and the requirement was removed from the duties of the post to enable his appointment, although the title of the chair was not changed. The two Savilian chairs have been linked with professorial fellowships at New College, Oxford, since the late 19th century. Before then, for over 175 years until the middle of the 19th century, the geometry professors had an official residence adjoining the college in New College Lane.

There have been 20 professors; Frances Kirwan, the current (as of 2020) and first female holder of the chair, was appointed in 2017. The post has been held by a number of distinguished mathematicians. Briggs helped to develop the common logarithm, described as "one of the most useful systems for mathematics". The third professor, John Wallis, introduced the use of ∞ for infinity, and was regarded as "one of the leading mathematicians of his time". Both Edmond Halley, who successfully predicted the return of the comet named in his honour, and his successor Nathaniel Bliss held the post of Astronomer Royal in addition to the professorship. Stephen Rigaud (professor 1810–27) has been called "the foremost historian of astronomy and mathematics in his generation". The life and work of James Sylvester (professor 1883–94) was commemorated by the Royal Society by the inauguration of the Sylvester Medal; this was won by a later professor, Edward Titchmarsh. Two professors, Sylvester and Michael Atiyah (professor 1963–69), have been awarded the Copley Medal of the Royal Society; Atiyah also won the Fields Medal while he was professor.

== Foundation and duties ==
Sir Henry Savile, the Warden of Merton College, Oxford, and Provost of Eton College, was deeply saddened by what the 20th-century mathematician Ida Busbridge has termed "the wretched state of mathematical studies in England", and so founded professorships in geometry and astronomy at the University of Oxford in 1619; both chairs were named after him. He also donated his books to the university's Bodleian Library "for the use chiefly of mathematical readers". He required the professors to be men of good character, at least 26 years old, and to have "imbibed the purer philosophy from the springs of Aristotle and Plato" before acquiring a thorough knowledge of science. The professors could come from any Christian country, but he specified that a professor from England should have a Master of Arts degree as a minimum. He wanted students to be educated in the works of the leading scientists of the ancient world, saying that the professor of geometry should teach Euclid's Elements, Apollonius's Conics, and the works of Archimedes; tuition in trigonometry was to be shared by the two professors. As many students would have had little mathematical knowledge, the professors were also permitted to provide instruction in basic mathematics in English (as opposed to Latin, the language used in education at Oxford at the time).

== Appointment ==
Savile's first choice for the professorship of geometry was Edmund Gunter, Professor of Astronomy at Gresham College, London. It was reported that Gunter demonstrated the use of his sector and quadrant, but Savile regarded this as "showing of tricks" rather than geometry, and instead appointed Henry Briggs, the Gresham Professor of Geometry, in 1619. Briggs took up the chair in 1620 at an annual salary of £150 (Note: In 2013 terms (the last year for which updating figures are available as of January 2015), £150 in 1620 would be equivalent to about £27,290 updated for inflation using the Retail Price Index or about £5,345,000 updated to represent an equivalent share of gross domestic product.) and thus became the first person to hold the first two mathematical chairs established in Britain.

Savile reserved to himself the right to appoint the professors during his lifetime. After his death, he provided that vacancies should be filled by a majority of a group of "most distinguished persons": the Archbishop of Canterbury, the Lord Chancellor, the Chancellor of the university, the Bishop of London, the Secretary of State, the Chief Justice of the Common Pleas, the Chief Justice of the King's Bench, the Chief Baron of the Exchequer and the Dean of the Court of Arches. The Vice-Chancellor of the university was to inform the electors of any vacancy, and could be summoned to advise them. The appointment could either be made straight away, or delayed for some months to see whether "any eminent mathematician can be allured" from abroad.

As part of reforms of the university in the 19th century, the University of Oxford commissioners laid down new statutes for the chair in 1881. The professor was to "lecture and give instruction in pure and analytical Geometry", and was to be a Fellow of New College. The electors for the professorship were to be the Warden of New College (or a person nominated by the college in his place), the Chancellor of the University of Oxford, the President of the Royal Society, the Sedleian Professor of Natural Philosophy at Oxford, the Sadleirian Professor of Pure Mathematics at the University of Cambridge, a person nominated by the university council and one other nominated by New College. Edward Titchmarsh (professor from 1931 to 1963) said when applying that he was not prepared to lecture on geometry, and the requirement was removed from the duties of the professor to enable his appointment, although the title of the chair was not changed. Changes to the university's internal legislation in the 20th and early 21st centuries abolished specific statutes for the duties of, and rules for appointment to, individual chairs such as the Savilian professorships. The University Council is now empowered to make appropriate arrangements for appointments and conditions of service, with the college to which any professorship is allocated (New College in the case of the Savilian chairs) to have two representatives on the board of electors.

== Professors' house ==
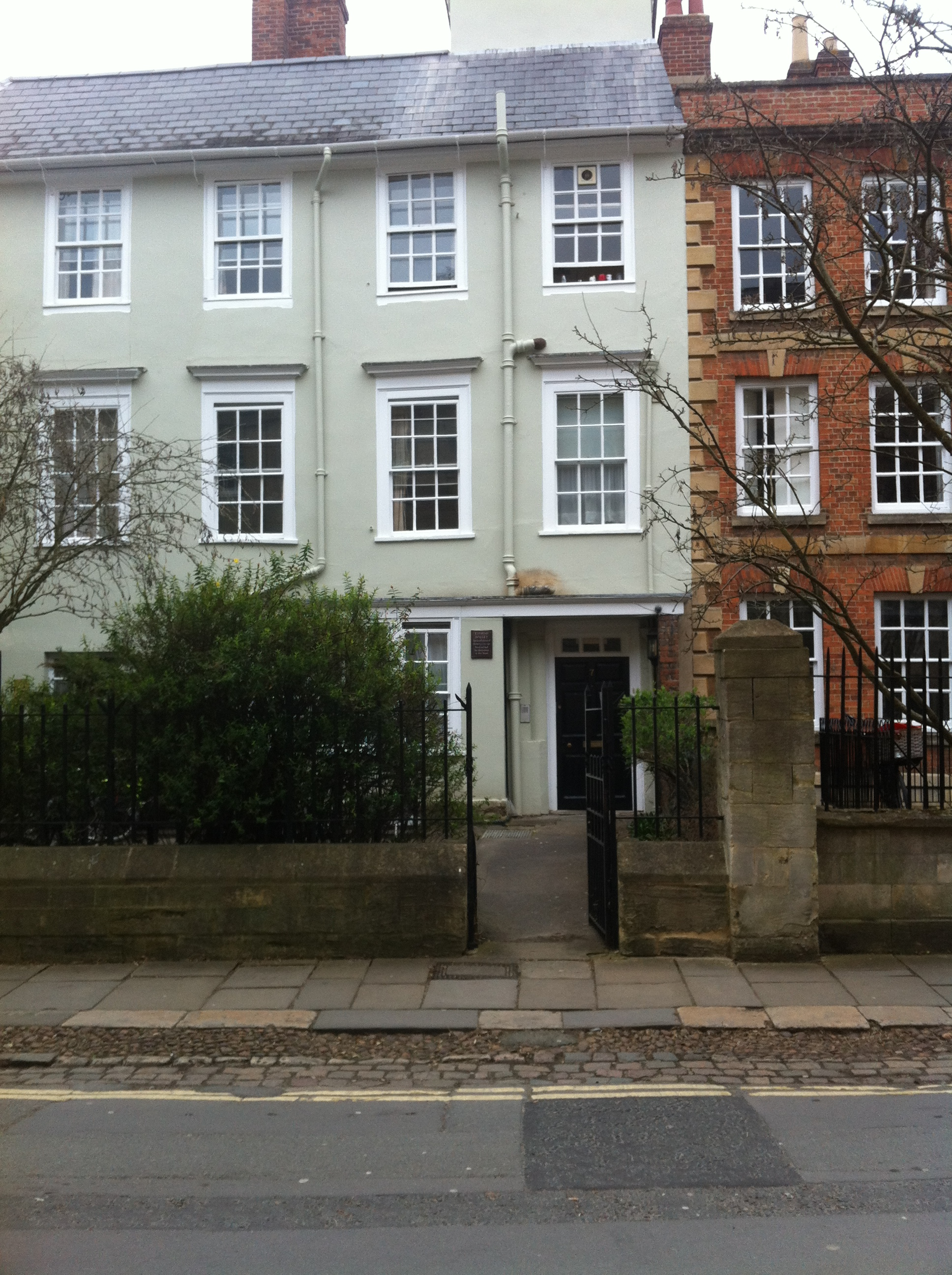
The house on New College Lane formerly used by the geometry professors

John Wallis (professor 1649–1703) rented a house from New College on New College Lane from 1672 until his death in 1703; at some point, it was divided into two houses. Towards the end of his life, David Gregory (the Savilian Professor of Astronomy) lived in the eastern part of the premises: although no lease between Wallis and Gregory survives (if one was ever made between the two friends), Gregory's name appears for the first time in the parish rate-book of 1701. Wallis's son gave the unexpired portion of the lease to the university in 1704 in honour of his father's long tenure of the chair, to provide official residences for the two Savilian professors. New College renewed the lease at a low rent from 1716 and thereafter at intervals until the last renewal in 1814. Records of who lived in each house are not available throughout the period, but surviving documentation shows that the professors often sub-let the houses and for about twenty years in the early 18th century the premises were being used as a lodging house. Stephen Rigaud lived there from 1810 until he became the astronomy professor in 1827; thereafter, Baden Powell lived there with his family. The geometry professors were associated with the houses for longer than the astronomy professors: when the Radcliffe Observatory was built in the 1770s, the post of Radcliffe Observer was coupled to the astronomy professorship, and they were provided with a house in that role; thereafter, the university sublet the astronomy professor's house itself. In the early 19th century, New College decided that it wished to use the properties for itself and the lease expired in 1854.

== List of professors ==
Summary of the professors in time order
Portrait	Name	Years	Education (Note: At the University of Oxford, unless otherwise indicated)	College as Professor	Notes
	Henry Briggs	1619–1631	University of Cambridge (St John's College)	Merton College (Note: Briggs resided at Merton, and incorporated as a member of the university through it, but was not a fellow.)	Briggs was a lecturer in mathematics and in physic (medicine) at Cambridge, also becoming the first professor of geometry at Gresham College, London, in 1597. He had become acquainted with the principles of Napier's logarithm by 1615: logarithms aided the calculations of astronomy and navigation that were carried out at Gresham since they allowed multiplication of multi-digit numbers to be carried out through the addition of their logarithms. The innovation that Briggs suggested to Napier was to use steps of 10 (the common logarithm). After two visits by Briggs to John Napier in Edinburgh, they agreed a redefinition of the logarithm process, but Napier wrote in 1617 that the calculations would have to be carried out by others, including Briggs, because of his own ill health. Briggs is regarded as having created "one of the most useful systems for mathematics". In 1624, his main work, Arithmetica logarithmica, was published with calculations of the logarithms of 1 to 20,000 and 90,001 to 100,000 to fourteen decimal places. He died in Merton in 1631 and was buried in the choir of Merton College chapel.
	Peter Turner	1631–1648	St Mary Hall and Christ Church	Merton College	Turner succeeded Briggs as professor of geometry at Gresham College, London, in 1620; he succeeded him in the Savilian professorship and resigned as Gresham professor in 1631. Before this, he had been asked by William Laud (Archbishop of Canterbury and Chancellor of the University of Oxford) to help draft new statutes to govern the university; the final draft was his work, and was published in 1634. During the English Civil War, he fought on the side of the Royalists and was captured near Stow-on-the-Wold in 1641; he was imprisoned in Southwark until an exchange of prisoners in 1643. He was evicted from his fellowship at Merton and from the professorship by the Parliamentary visitors in charge of the university in 1648, and died in poverty in 1652. He appears to have published little of substance, despite a good contemporary reputation as a mathematician and classical scholar.
	John Wallis	1649–1703	University of Cambridge (Emmanuel College)	Exeter College (Note: Wallis incorporated as a member of the university through Exeter College, but was not a fellow of the college.)	Before he entered Cambridge, Wallis was taught some mathematics at the age of 15 by his elder brother. He later claimed to have been self-taught in mathematics thereafter, saying in his autobiography that he had studied it as "a pleasing Diversion, at spare hours", adding that it then was regarded as more for "Traders, Merchants, Seamen, Carpenters, Surveyors of Lands, or the like" than as a subject for academical study at university level. He developed an interest in cryptography, working on behalf of the Parliamentarians during the English Civil War. He was one of the founding members of the Royal Society, writing over sixty papers and book reviews for it. After his appointment to the chair, he developed his mathematical skills such that he became "one of the leading mathematicians of his time": he introduced ∞ as the sign for infinity, influenced Isaac Newton with his writings, and took part in various mathematical debates with scholars such as Blaise Pascal and Thomas Hobbes. He was appointed Keeper of the Archives for the university in 1658, and continued in his posts after the Restoration of Charles II in 1660 until his death at the age of 86.
	Edmond Halley	1704–1742	The Queen's College	The Queen's College (Note: Halley was a member of Queen's, but not appointed to a fellowship.)	Halley, who later calculated the orbit of what became known as Halley's Comet, was already in correspondence with European astronomers as an undergraduate, writing three scientific papers in this time. He left Oxford to travel to St Helena for the 1677 transit of Mercury, so that he could calculate the distance of the Sun; his work brought him a leading reputation in Europe and election to the Royal Society aged 22. He questioned Isaac Newton on the orbits of the planets, leading Newton to renew his study of the topic and write his Principia Mathematica in 1687; Halley supervised and paid for its publication. He failed to be appointed as Savilian Professor of Astronomy in 1691, but was appointed by Newton to a position in the Royal Mint instead. His own works included discussion of rainbows, optics and barometers, and he calculated the site of Julius Caesar's invasion of Britain by reference to the tides. He also carried out navigational surveys on behalf of the Royal Navy and drew up tables calculating the positions of the Sun, Moon and planets for many centuries. He was appointed Astronomer Royal in 1721.
	Nathaniel Bliss	1742–1764	Pembroke College	Pembroke College (Note: Bliss was a member of Pembroke, but not appointed to a fellowship.)	Bliss was appointed rector of St Ebbe's Church, Oxford, in 1736. When he applied to succeed Halley, his supporters included James Bradley (the Astronomer Royal) and Robert Smith (professor of astronomy at the University of Cambridge). As professor, he established an observatory (the fourth in the city) by attaching his instruments to a part of Oxford city wall near his official house. He provided astronomical measurements to Bradley and George Parker, 2nd Earl of Macclesfield, who had an observatory at Shirburn Castle. Bliss succeeded Bradley as Astronomer Royal in 1762, but died suddenly in 1764.
	Joseph Betts	1765–1766	University College	University College	Betts tried and failed to be elected as Savilian Professor of Astronomy in 1763, the post going to Thomas Hornsby instead. His supporters at that election included George Lee, 3rd Earl of Lichfield (the university's Chancellor), John Stuart, 3rd Earl of Bute (Prime Minister 1762–1763), and George Montagu-Dunk, 2nd Earl of Halifax (Secretary of State). He expressed his thanks to them in the dedication of a print of the annular solar eclipse of 1 April 1764.
	John Smith	1766–1796	Balliol College and St Mary Hall	St Mary Hall	Smith studied at Balliol from 1744 onwards, receiving his Bachelor of Arts degree in 1748, his Master of Arts degree in 1751 and his Bachelor of Medicine degree in 1753. He obtained his Doctor of Medicine degree as a member of St Mary Hall, and was working as a doctor in Cheltenham in 1784, when Abraham Robertson deputised for him. Smith built a stable and a small tenement behind his official house, destroying part of the medieval city wall as he did so, and bequeathed both additions to his successors in the chair in a "rather pompous" clause in his will.
	Abraham Robertson	1797–1810	Christ Church	Christ Church (Note: Robertson was a chaplain of Christ Church before the college appointed him as vicar of a parish in Northampton, but he continued to reside in Oxford; he was not appointed to a college fellowship.)	Robertson started studying at Oxford aged 24, having previously unsuccessfully run an evening school in Oxford for mechanics. He was supported by John Smith, and deputised for him in 1784 as Smith was working as a doctor in Cheltenham. He was well-regarded as a lecturer, noted for his clarity and the assistance he gave in encouraging students. He was elected as a Fellow of the Royal Society in 1795 to mark his work on conic sections (the subject of his main work, Sectionum conicarum libri septem, in 1792) and his "literary attainments and diligence in the pursuit of science". He also oversaw publication of an edition of the works of Archimedes. He succeeded Smith in 1797, and became Savilian professor of astronomy in 1810.
	Stephen Rigaud	1810–1827	Exeter College	— (Note: Rigaud was a fellow of Exeter College until 1810; thereafter he is not recorded as holding a college appointment.)	Rigaud, whose father was the observer at Kew Observatory, made his first recorded observations in astronomy when at Exeter College, and was elected to a fellowship of the college when still an undergraduate. From about 1805, he substituted for Thomas Hornsby, Savilian Professor of Astronomy and reader in experimental philosophy, because of Hornsby's illness. When Robertson succeeded Hornsby in 1810, Rigaud was appointed to the geometry chair; he succeeded his father at Kew in 1814, becoming joint observer with his grandfather. He succeeded Robertson in the astronomy and experimental philosophy positions in 1827. His wife died in the same year, and Rigaud devoted himself to his children and his work; he has been described as "the foremost historian of astronomy and mathematics in his generation", and as "renowned for his personal and scholarly integrity".
	Baden Powell	1827–1860	Oriel College	— (Note: Powell is not recorded as holding a college appointment.)	Powell carried out experiments in the areas of heat and light when he was a parish priest in Kent and London, although he found it difficult to keep abreast with mathematical advances in physics and some of the papers he offered to the Royal Society in the 1830s had considerable mistakes. He resigned his parish position when appointed to the chair, and was an active member of scientific organisations and commissions, with many publications to his credit. He was also noted for his stance on theological issues, opposing the work of the Oxford Movement (a group within the Church of England, sometimes referred to as "Tractarians", who aimed to reform the church by reasserting its links with the early Catholic church), denying miracles and defending the theories of Charles Darwin. He advocated reform within the university, including improving the position of scientific studies, but opposition to his stance left him isolated at Oxford. He moved to London in 1854, and mixed with leading individuals from science and literature. One of his sons was Robert Baden-Powell, the founder of the Scout Movement.
	Henry Smith	1861–1883	Balliol College	Balliol College and Corpus Christi College (Note: Smith carried on lecturing in mathematics at Balliol for financial reasons until 1871, when he was appointed to a sinecure fellowship at Corpus Christi; he was made an honorary fellow of Balliol as well.)	Smith's undergraduate studies at Oxford were interrupted by smallpox and malaria, but he studied in Paris during his convalescence and obtained first-class degrees in classics and also in mathematics in the same year. A fellow and lecturer in mathematics at Balliol, Smith also oversaw the college's laboratory and taught chemistry; he also arranged for lectures in mathematics to be given jointly with other colleges, a system that was adopted by other colleges and subjects and later grew into a university-based lecture system. From 1874, he was also Keeper of the Oxford University Museum of Natural History. He was heavily involved with university committees, advocating the place of science and mathematics at Oxford, and with royal commissions on scientific instruction and on universities. His mathematical research in geometry, elliptic function theory and (in particular) number theory was highly regarded.
	James Sylvester	1883–1894	University of London and University of Cambridge (St John's College)	New College	Sylvester started at the University of London aged 14 but left after allegedly assaulting another student; he later studied at Cambridge and was Second Wrangler (second in the university mathematics examinations) but could not be awarded a degree or prizes, or be made a college fellow, because he was Jewish. He then became professor of natural philosophy at University College, London for three years before moving to the University of Virginia in 1841, resigning after a dispute with university authorities in 1842. Back in England, he worked as an actuary, carrying out mathematical research in elimination theory in his spare time, before appointment as professor of mathematics at Royal Military Academy, Woolwich, in 1855. After compulsory retirement aged 55, he spent a few years writing poetry and enjoying his club before returning to the United States in 1876 as professor of mathematics at the newly opened Johns Hopkins University, in Baltimore, Maryland. The move reinvigorated his research on invariant theory and matrix theory; he published the results in the American Journal of Mathematics, which he founded. During this time, he was awarded the Copley Medal by the Royal Society. Homesick, he applied for the Savilian professorship (Oxford having lifted the bar on Jewish academics) and resigned from Johns Hopkins before receiving news of his appointment. He delayed his inaugural lecture until 1885 because he had difficulty finding a suitable topic. With his health failing, a deputy was appointed for him in 1892; he resigned in 1894. The Royal Society inaugurated the Sylvester Medal in his honour in 1901.
	William Esson	1897–1916	St John's College	New College	Esson, a fellow of Merton College from 1860, acted as deputy professor from 1894 until his appointment in 1897, when he became a fellow of New College. His work with Augustus Harcourt on the rate of chemical change (published in three papers in the Philosophical Transactions of the Royal Society, spread over 30 years) led to the award of fellowship of the Royal Society in 1869; one obituary notice said that the remainder of his publications were "neither numerous nor of great importance." In his obituary, The Times called him "a distinguished veteran in mathematical science", who had "devoted himself to higher mathematics and its connexions with natural science with eminent success".
	G. H. Hardy	1919–1931	University of Cambridge (Trinity College)	New College	Hardy was awarded a prize fellowship at Trinity College in 1900, and published the first of his research papers (which eventually totalled over 350) in the same year. His collaboration with J. E. Littlewood began in 1911, a partnership described as "the most famous in the history of mathematics", with more than 100 joint papers on topics such as distribution of prime numbers, mathematical analysis, analytic number theory, and solving the Waring problem. He also worked with the Indian mathematical prodigy Srinivasa Ramanujan. He was a friend and colleague of the philosopher Bertrand Russell and was upset by Russell's treatment by Cambridge for his pacifist views during the First World War. He was happier in Oxford, but returned to Cambridge in 1931 to take up the position of Sadleirian Professor of Pure Mathematics. His contribution to population genetics is known as the Hardy–Weinberg principle, described by a biographer of Hardy (the Cambridge mathematician Béla Bollobás) as one of the few exceptions to Hardy's claim that nothing he had done, "for good or ill", had made or was likely to make "the least difference to the amenity of the world".
	Edward Titchmarsh	1931–1963	Balliol College	New College	Titchmarsh studied with Hardy and acted as his secretary before obtaining a lectureship at University College, London in 1923; he was also a non-resident fellow of Magdalen College, Oxford, between 1924 and 1930. He was professor of pure mathematics at the University of Liverpool from 1929 until succeeding Hardy at Oxford in 1931. As Titchmarsh (unlike Hardy) had said when applying that he was unwilling to lecture on geometry, one of the requirements of the Oxford chair, the stipulation was removed for him. He was a leading figure in Oxford mathematics thereafter, publishing extensively and winning the Sylvester Medal of the Royal Society in 1955, but had little enthusiasm for lecturing.
	Michael Atiyah	1963–1969	University of Cambridge (Trinity College)	New College	Atiyah taught and carried out research in Cambridge and in the United States (at Princeton University, New Jersey). He then moved to Oxford in 1961, initially as a Fellow of St Catherine's College and Reader in Mathematics, before he succeeded Titchmarsh. He moved back to Princeton to take up a chair in 1969, although returned to Oxford in 1973 as Royal Society Research Professor. In 1990, he became Master of Trinity College, Cambridge (a post he held until 1997), and was later President of the Royal Society of Edinburgh (2005–2008). He was knighted in 1983 and made a member of the Order of Merit in 1992. Mathematical awards include the Fields Medal (1966) for his work on K-theory and the Atiyah–Singer index theorem (work which has been used by theoretical physicists) and the Copley Medal of the Royal Society (1988).
	Ioan James	1970–1995	The Queen's College	New College	After studying at Oxford, James moved to the United States to carry out research at Princeton University in New Jersey and at University of California, Berkeley, returning to a research fellowship at Gonville and Caius College, Cambridge. In 1957, James became Reader in Pure Mathematics at Oxford, and also was a senior research fellow at St John's College from 1959 until his appointment to the Savilian professorship in 1970. He retired in 1995, becoming professor emeritus. His research topics were in the field of topology, especially homotopy, and he has also written on the history of topology and edited a journal on the subject.
	Richard Taylor	1995–1996	University of Cambridge (Clare College)	New College	Taylor studied at Cambridge and in the United States at Princeton University, New Jersey, before becoming a fellow of Clare College in 1988. He moved to Oxford in 1995, but resigned after one year to take up a chair at Harvard University. He has worked on Langlands program and, with others, proved the Sato–Tate conjecture, and collaborated with Andrew Wiles on the solution to Fermat's Last Theorem. He was awarded the Shaw Prize in 2007 (along with Robert Langlands) "for initiating and developing a grand unifying vision of mathematics that connects prime numbers with symmetry."
	Nigel Hitchin	1997–2016	Jesus College and Wolfson College	New College	Hitchin taught in the United States at Princeton University in New Jersey and at New York University, then returned to Wolfson College for further research before becoming a fellow and tutor at St Catherine's College. He was a professor of mathematics at Warwick University before becoming Rouse Ball Professor of Mathematics at the University of Cambridge in 1994. His research areas include differential geometry, algebraic geometry, Hyperkähler geometry and special Lagrangian geometry.
	Frances Kirwan	2017 - 2025	University of Cambridge (Clare College) and Balliol College	New College	Kirwan held a Junior Fellowship at Harvard from 1983 to 1985, and held a fellowship at Magdalen College, Oxford, from 1983 to 1986, before becoming a fellow at Balliol College, Oxford. Her research interests include moduli spaces in algebraic geometry, geometric invariant theory (GIT), and in the link between GIT and moment maps in symplectic geometry. Her work endeavours to understand the structure of geometric objects by investigation of their algebraic and topological properties.
	Dominic Joyce	2025 onwards	Merton College	New College	Joyce completed a D.Phil in geometry at Merton College, Oxford, supervised by Simon Donaldson, in 1992. He subsequently held short-term research posts at Christ Church, Oxford, as well as at Princeton University and the University of California, Berkeley. Since 1995 he has been a lecturer in mathematics at Oxford and a tutorial fellow at Lincoln College, becoming Professor of Mathematics in 2006. Joyce's main contributions include: constructing the first known examples of compact 7- and 8- manifolds with exceptional holonomy groups G2 and Spin(7); writing the standard reference text 'Compact Manifolds with Special Holonomy', identifying and studying singularities in calibrated submanifolds; contributing to the theory of counting invariants for Calabi-Yau moduli spaces (Donaldson-Thomas theory); and developing a new framework in derived geometry to give rigorous footing to moduli space constructions in symplectic and algebraic geometry.

== See also ==
- Gresham Professor of Geometry
- List of professorships at the University of Oxford
