= External examiner =

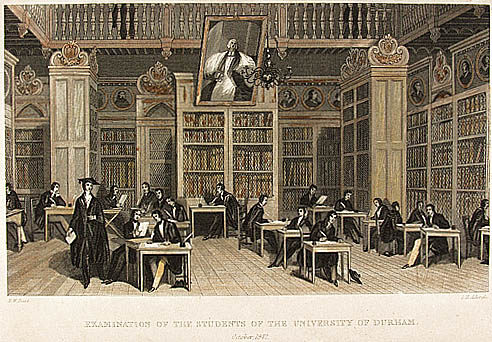
Examination at Durham University in 1842, where the external examiner system originated.

The external examiner plays an important role in degree-level examinations in higher education in the United Kingdom. The external examiner system originated in 1832 with the establishment of the University of Durham, and was then adopted by other British universities in the 19th century before spreading to other countries.

== Development and spread ==
The first recorded requirement for external oversight was a 1788 law in the Kingdom of Denmark-Norway that required independent verification of the competence of newly trained doctors by censors, although the actual examination was held by the professors alone.

The system of external experts participating in university examinations as external examiners originated in 1832 with the establishment of the University of Durham, the first university in England since the University of Cambridge was founded 600 years earlier. Durham used examiners from the University of Oxford to assure the public that its degrees were a similar standard to Oxford's. The first two external examiners were George Johnson of Queen's College, Oxford, and Thomas Legh Claughton of Trinity College, Oxford, both of whom had recently been examiners at the University of Oxford.

The establishment of more universities in England from the 1880s was accompanied by a requirement that examinations be conducted by internal and external examiners. Following the introduction of external examination in Britain in the 19th century, this was adopted by other countries including Denmark, Sweden, New Zealand, India and Malaysia.

While the role of the external examiner varies with the culture and level of examination, the purpose of the system remains the same: to ensure that standards are kept the same across universities, and to provide an assurance of fair play given that internal examiners might be prejudiced for or against a candidate. In consequence, (by convention and often by regulation) if examiners disagree, the view of the external examiner takes precedence. External examination is one of the oldest systems of quality control within higher education.

== Practice by level of higher education ==
=== Undergraduate and taught postgraduate examinations ===
In undergraduate and taught postgraduate examinations, external examiners typically see and have to approve draft examination questions before the papers are set; and they will review the marks and the work of at least a sample of candidates. They are often asked to adjudicate when candidates are on borderlines or when internal examiners have disagreed about a candidate's marks. Externals are expected to make a report both to the department and also to the university authorities; they have wide licence to comment on all aspects of the degree programme, including its staffing and teaching, not just on the examination process. Where viva voce examinations are still held as part of the final degree assessment, it is common for external examiners to take part in them. Students may have the right to ask for their work to be considered by the external examiner. External examiners are typically appointed for a period of three or four years, and it is common to consult them about changes to the programme that are being introduced during their period of office. In the case of examinations in broad disciplines, there are commonly several external examiners with different areas of expertise on a board of examiners.

=== PhD examinations and appointees ===
While the external examiner in the form described above (and in many cases, the use of the title "external examiner") is specific to British or British-influenced higher education, the use of examiners from other universities (and often other countries) is widespread in other countries, especially for PhD examinations. In some countries, e.g. Australia, New Zealand and India, externals commonly send their opinions by post, though there may also be a "local" external examiner who is present at the viva.

Whatever the level of examination, it is normal to appoint as externals senior academics of acknowledged expertise – though in the case of PhD exams, expertise takes priority over seniority if the two criteria cannot both be met, as is often the case with highly specialised subjects. An invitation or appointment to serve as an external examiner is therefore usually seen as something of an honour, though often an inconvenient one: although a fee or honorarium is paid to external examiners, it is usually small, and a considerable amount of work is involved, often at the busiest time of the academic year.

== Use around the world ==
=== United Kingdom ===
As of the 2022 revision of the Office for Students' regulatory framework for higher education, external examiners are not explicitly required for undergraduate examinations at English universities. However, they remain an established and recognised part of the academic infrastructure promoting comparability and common standards, and there is guidance that an institution applying for degree awarding powers must demonstrate that "the organisation makes scrupulous use of external examiners including in the moderation of assessment tasks and student assessed work".

In other countries of the UK (i.e. Wales, Scotland and Northern Ireland), there is a requirement that providers "[use] external expertise, assessment and classification processes that are reliable, fair and transparent", with guidance making it clear that this includes using external examiners.

In doctoral examinations within the UK, there are normally only two or three examiners, and the external examiner usually takes the lead in questioning the candidate in the viva voce examination, which is the key stage of the assessment.

== Bibliography ==
- Enakshi Sengupta; Patrick Blessinger; Andrew Ssemwanga; Barbara Cozza (17 May 2021). The Role of External Examining in Higher Education: Challenges and Best Practices. Emerald Group Publishing. ISBN 9781839098802.
- "External Examining Principles" (PDF). Quality Assurance Agency for Higher Education. UK Standing Committee for Quality Assessment. August 2022.
