= Savilian Professor of Astronomy =

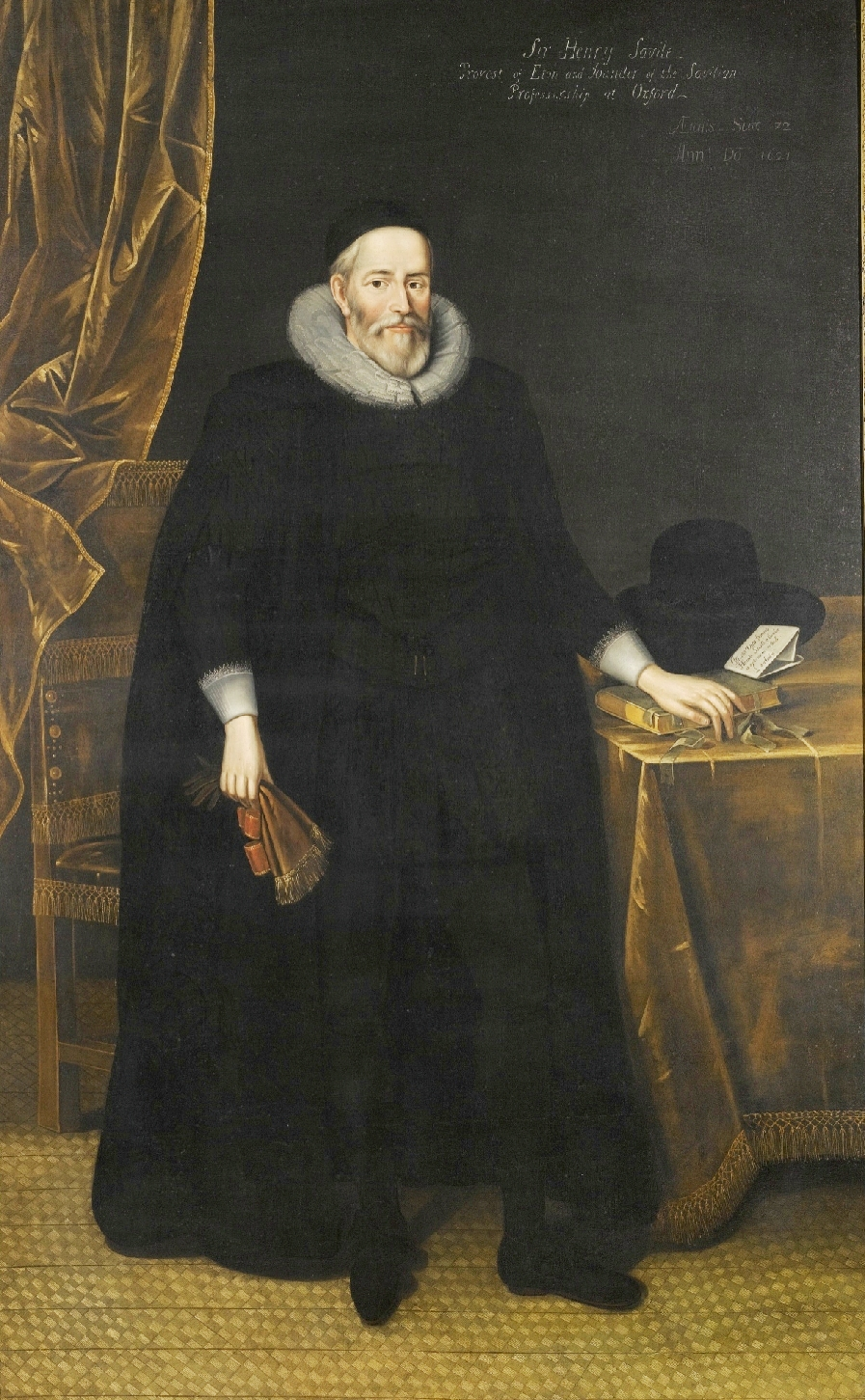
Sir Henry Savile, founder of the professorship

The position of Savilian Professor of Astronomy was established at the University of Oxford in 1619. It was founded (at the same time as the Savilian Professorship of Geometry) by Sir Henry Savile, a mathematician and classical scholar who was Warden of Merton College, Oxford, and Provost of Eton College. He appointed John Bainbridge as the first professor, who took up his duties in 1620 or 1621.

There have been 21 astronomy professors in all; Steven Balbus, the current professor, was appointed in 2012. Past professors include Christopher Wren (1661–73), architect of St Paul's Cathedral in London and the Sheldonian Theatre in Oxford; he held the professorship at the time of his commission to rebuild the cathedral after it was destroyed by the Great Fire of London in 1666. Three professors have been awarded the Gold Medal of the Royal Astronomical Society: Charles Pritchard (1870–93), Harry Plaskett (1932–60) and Joseph Silk (1999–2012). The two Savilian chairs have been linked with professorial fellowships at New College, Oxford, since the late 19th century. In the past, some of the professors were provided with an official residence, either near New College or at the Radcliffe Observatory, although this practice ended in the 19th century. The astronomy professor is a member of the Sub-Department of Astrophysics at Oxford.

== Foundation and duties ==
Sir Henry Savile, the Warden of Merton College, Oxford, and Provost of Eton College, was deeply saddened by what the 20th-century mathematician Ida Busbridge has described as "the wretched state of mathematical studies in England", (Note: Savile began the Latin document by which he established the professorships thus: "I, Henry Savile, Knight, seeing that Mathematical studies are uncultivated by our countryman, and being desirous of supplying a remedy in a quarter almost given up in despair, and to redeem so far as in me lies, almost from destruction, sciences of the noblest kind, do, of the King's authority, and with the consent of the University of Oxford, found and establish for all future times in the said University, two lectureships or public professorships in the Mathematical sciences, one in Geometry and the other in Astronomy.") and so founded professorships in geometry and astronomy at the University of Oxford in 1619; both chairs were named after him. He also donated his books to the university's Bodleian Library. He required the professors to be men of good character, at least 26 years old, and to have "imbibed the purer philosophy from the springs of Aristotle and Plato" before acquiring a thorough knowledge of science. The professors could come from any Christian country, but he specified that a professor from England should have a Master of Arts degree as a minimum. He wanted students to be educated in the works of the leading scientists of the ancient world; in addition, the astronomy professor should cover Copernicus and the work of Arab astronomers. Tuition in trigonometry was to be shared by the two professors. As many students would have had little mathematical knowledge, the professors were also permitted to provide instruction in basic mathematics in English (as opposed to Latin, the language used in education at Oxford at the time). He also required the astronomy professor "to take astronomical observations as well by night as by day (making choice of proper instruments prepared for the purpose, and at fitting times and seasons)", and to place in the library records of his discoveries. Savile prohibited the professors from practicing astrology or preparing horoscopes, and stated that accepting any position as a priest or as an officer of the university or of a college would cause forfeiture of the professorship. Each professor was required to lecture in public for 45 minutes twice weekly during the university terms and would be fined 10 shillings for every day missed (except in cases of "grievous bodily ailment", although this excuse was only permitted for three weeks before the professor was required to provide a substitute lecturer). Students who were required to attend, but who failed to do without good cause, were to be fined sixpence. Savile provided that the rents from specified properties in Kent and Essex were to be divided equally between the professors, giving each £160 annually. (Note: Updating for inflation using the Retail Price Index (RPI), £160 in 1619 was worth approximately £27,500 in 2013 (the latest year for which data is available as of February 2015). Updating the sum to represent an equivalent share of the United Kingdom's gross domestic product (GDP), £160 in 1620 was worth approximately £6.3M in 2013.)

== Appointment ==
Savile selected John Bainbridge to be the first astronomy professor; Bainbridge had impressed him with a description of a comet seen in 1618. In the documents establishing the professorship (sealed by Savile and the university in August 1619), Savile reserved to himself the right to appoint the professors during his lifetime, although he died in 1622 before the position fell vacant. He provided that after his death, vacancies should be filled by a majority of a group of "most distinguished persons": the Archbishop of Canterbury, the Lord Chancellor, the Chancellor of the university, the Bishop of London, the Secretary of State, the Chief Justice of the Common Pleas, the Chief Justice of the King's Bench, the Chief Baron of the Exchequer and the Dean of the Court of Arches. The Vice-Chancellor of the university was to inform the electors of any vacancy, and could be summoned to advise them. The appointment could either be made straight away, or delayed for some months to see whether "any eminent mathematician can be allured" from abroad.

As part of reforms of the university in the 19th century, the University of Oxford commissioners laid down new statutes for the chair in 1881, replacing Savile's original instructions and requirements. The 1881 statute provided that the professor was to "lecture and give instruction in theoretical and practical Astronomy", and was to be a Fellow of New College. The electors for the professorship were to be the Warden of New College (or a person nominated by the college in his place), the Chancellor of the university, the President of the Royal Society, the Astronomer Royal, the Radcliffe Observer, a person nominated by the university council and one other nominated by New College. Changes to the university's internal legislation in the 20th and early 21st centuries abolished specific statutes for the duties of, and rules for appointment to, individual chairs such as the Savilian professorships. The University Council is now empowered to make appropriate arrangements for appointments and conditions of service, with the college to which any professorship is allocated (New College in the case of the Savilian chairs) to have two representatives on the board of electors. The professorship is one of two permanent chairs attached to Oxford's Sub-Department of Astrophysics.

== Professors' houses ==
Two official residences have been provided for the astronomy professor. The first was in New College Lane, in central Oxford. John Wallis (geometry professor 1649–1703) rented a house there from New College from 1672 until his death in 1703; at some point, it was divided into two houses. Towards the end of his life, David Gregory (astronomy professor 1691–1708) lived in the eastern part of the premises. Wallis's son gave the unexpired portion of the lease to the university in 1704 in honour of his father's long tenure of the geometry chair, to provide official residences for the two Savilian professors. New College renewed the lease at a low rent from 1716 and thereafter at intervals until the last renewal in 1814. Records of who lived in each house are not available throughout the period, but surviving documentation shows that the professors often sub-let the houses and that for about 20 years in the early 18th century the premises were being used as a lodging house.

The second official residence was built during the time of Thomas Hornsby (astronomy professor 1763–1810), who proposed that an observatory should be built at a site to the north of the city centre. In 1772, construction began of the Radcliffe Observatory and of an adjoining house for the astronomy professor, to which Hornsby moved. Thereafter the university sub-let his former residence. Both of his successors, Abraham Robertson (1810–1827) and Stephen Rigaud (1827–1839), were the geometry professor at their appointment to the astronomy chair, and in turn they moved from New College Lane to the Radcliffe Observatory. The university then sub-let the astronomy professor's house. The link between the professorship and the observatory was broken in 1839 with the appointment of George Johnson; he had little practical astronomical experience and the officers in charge of the observatory appointed Manuel Johnson as Radcliffe Observer instead. In the early 19th century, New College decided that it wished to use the properties for itself and the lease expired without renewal in 1854. Charles Pritchard (1870–1893) had a new observatory built in the University Parks, but his attempts to persuade the university to add a residence for the Savilian professor were unsuccessful.

== List of professors ==
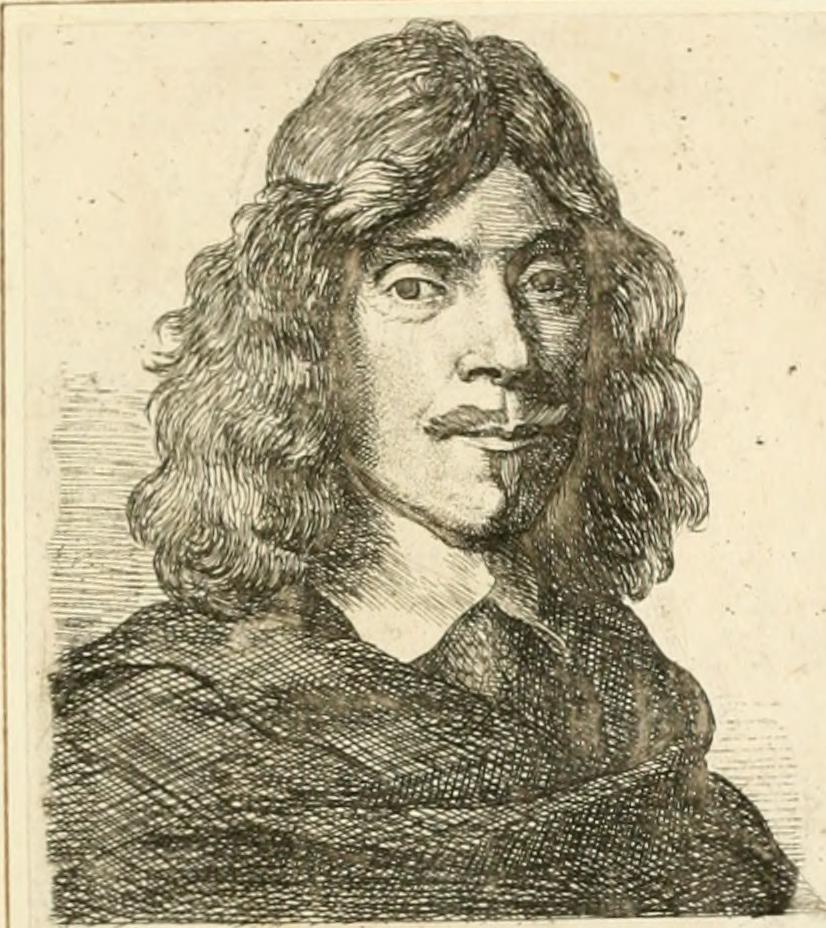
John Greaves, professor 1643–1648, also an Orientalist who surveyed the Great Pyramid of Giza.

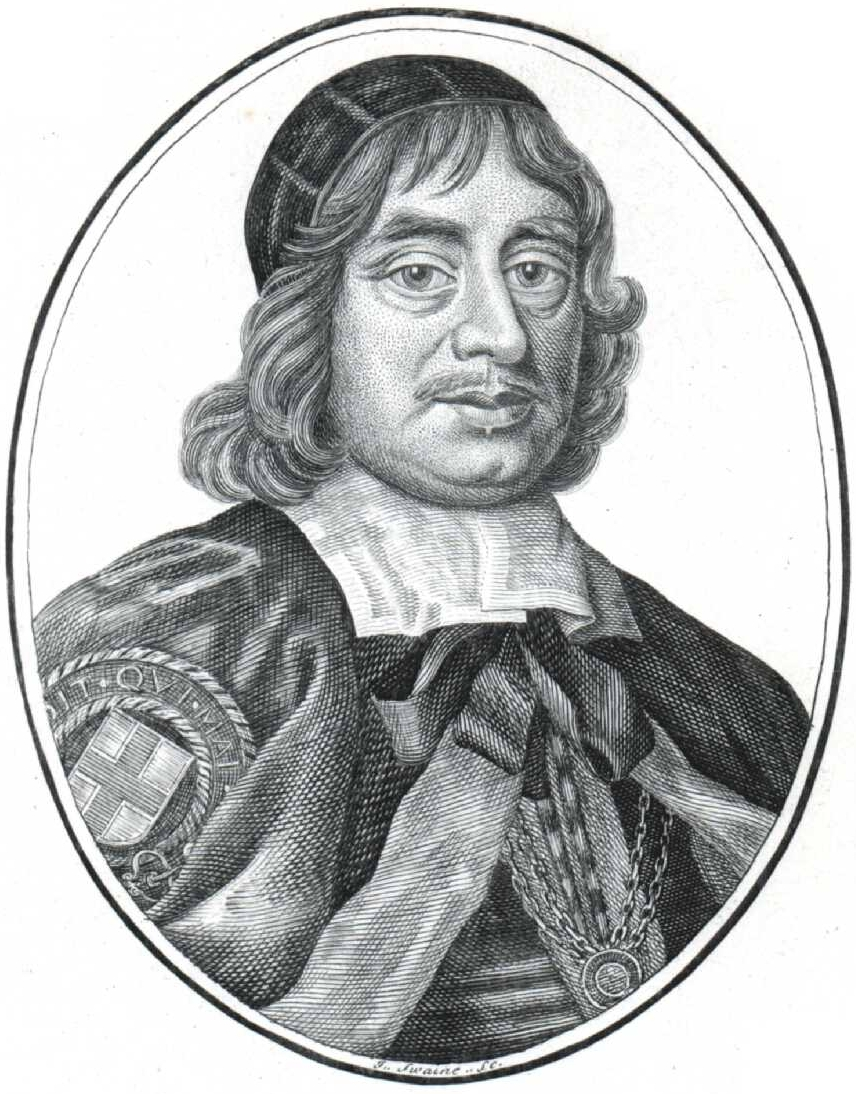
Seth Ward, professor 1649–1660 and later Bishop of Salisbury

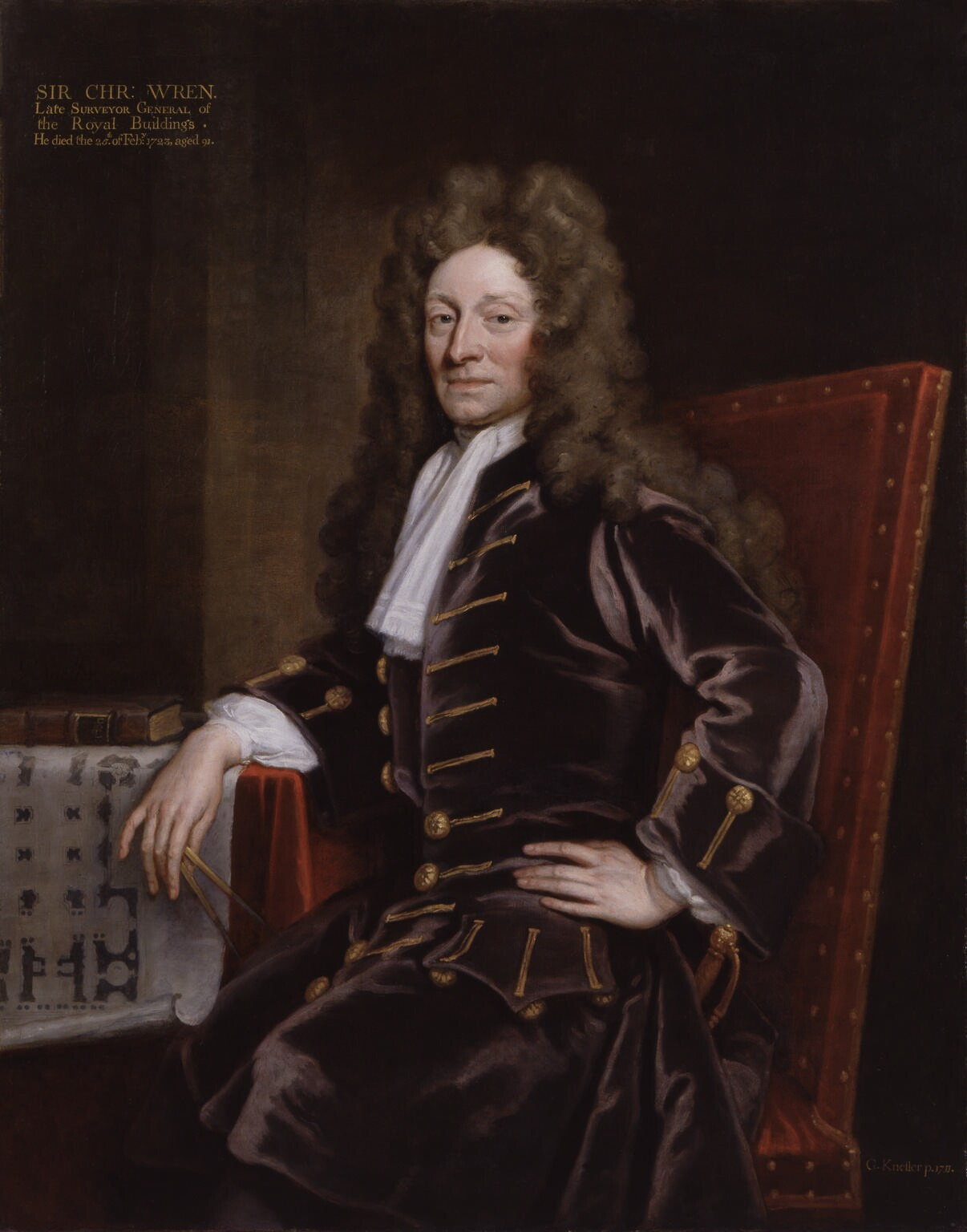
The architect Christopher Wren (painted here by Sir Godfrey Kneller in 1711) was astronomy professor from 1661 to 1673.

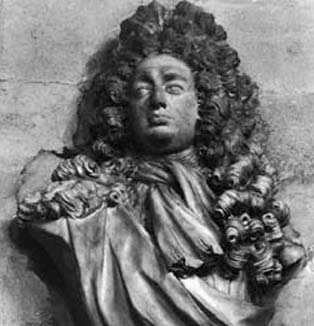
The Scottish mathematician David Gregory was astronomy professor from 1691 to 1708.

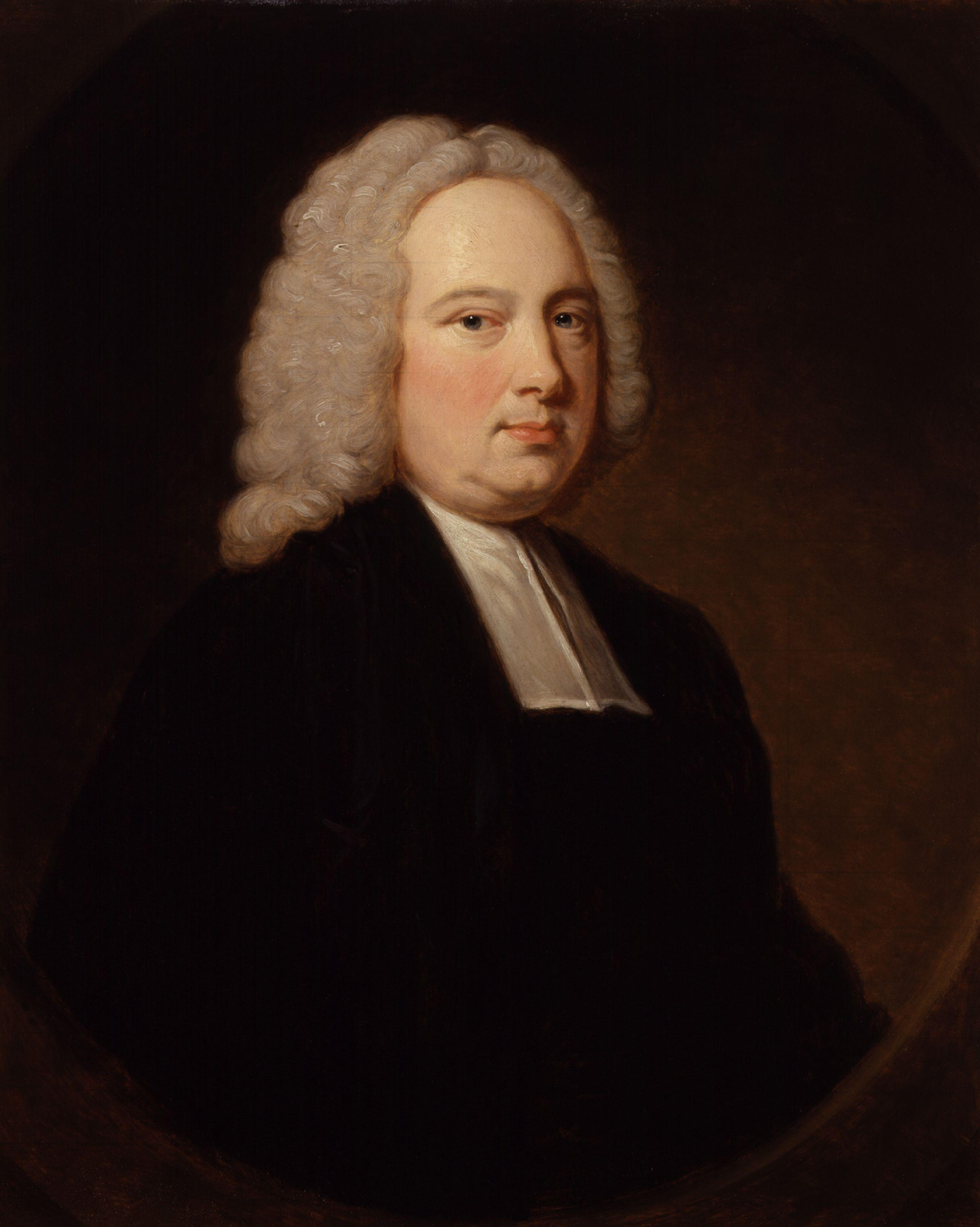
James Bradley (professor 1721–1762) was also Astronomer Royal for 20 years.

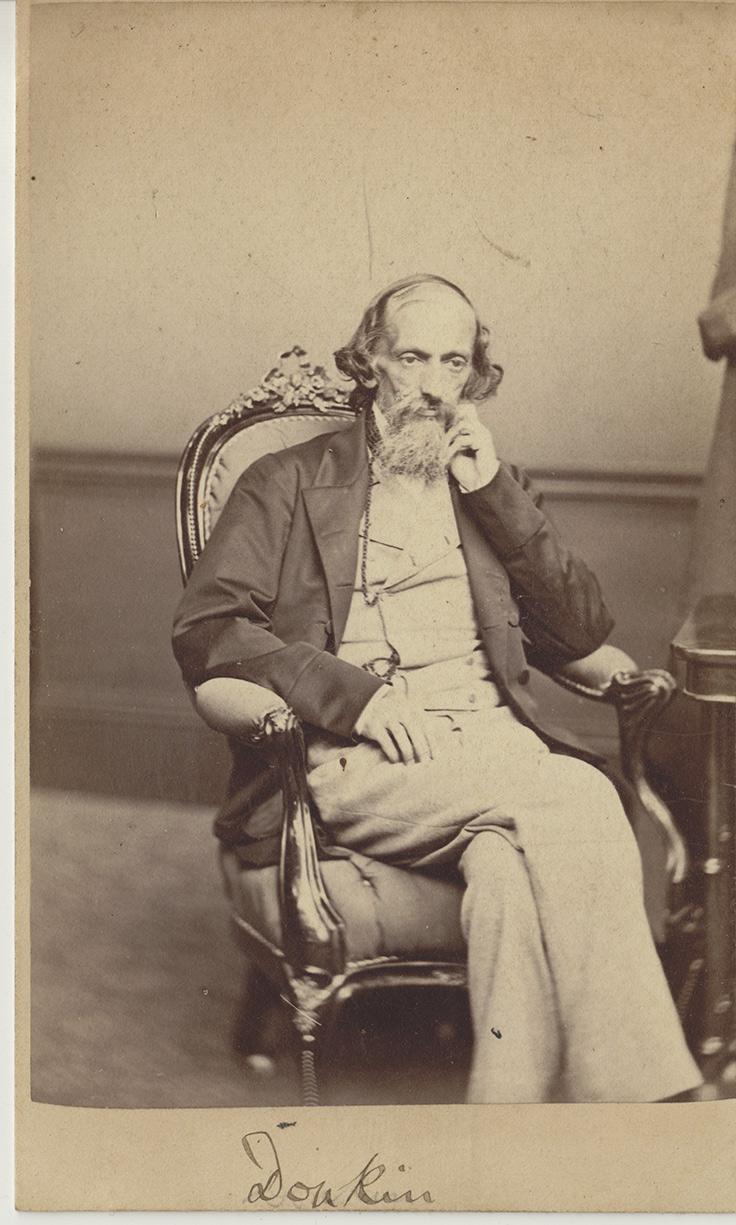
William Donkin held the chair from 1842 to 1869.

Details about the professors and their work
Name	Years	Education (Note: At the University of Oxford, unless otherwise indicated)	College as professor (Note: As a Fellow of the college, unless otherwise indicated)	Notes
John Bainbridge	1620 or 1621 – 1643 (Note: The Oxford Dictionary of National Biography entry for Bainbridge says that he was appointed in 1620; a list of the professors published by the university in the 19th century gives 1621 as his starting date.)	University of Cambridge (Emmanuel College)	Merton College	Bainbridge practised as a physician in Leicestershire and London after leaving Cambridge. His first book, An Astronomicall Description of the Late Comet, was published in 1619 and described the comet of the previous year. He was already known by this time to Sir Henry Savile and Henry Briggs (who Savile appointed as his first geometry professor). After his appointment to the chair, Bainbridge also lectured and practised in medicine. Although only a few other publications of his survive, they have been said to "reveal an acute intellect and deep learning." He demonstrated a knowledge of contemporary developments in astronomy, such as the work of Johannes Kepler, and studied Arabic to acquire details of astronomical observations in ancient sources. He also exposed the many mistakes that Joseph Scaliger made when attempting to explain the origins of the Julian calendar in observations of Sirius from ancient Egypt – an achievement that was recorded by his successor John Greaves on his memorial in Merton College Chapel.
John Greaves	1643–1648	Balliol College	Merton College	Greaves began studying astronomical texts in Greek, Arabic and Persian at about the time that he was appointed to a fellowship of Merton College in 1624. He was appointed Professor of Geometry at Gresham College, London, in 1631. He undertook an expedition to the Levant region of the Mediterranean in 1637 to carry out astronomical observations and to acquire learned books in oriental languages for William Laud (Chancellor of the University of Oxford and Archbishop of Canterbury). Some of the instruments he took with him are now held by the Museum of the History of Science in Oxford. He returned home in 1640, and succeeded Bainbridge in 1643. During the English Civil War, he was expelled from Oxford by the Parliamentary authorities in charge of the university in 1648, and moved to London, where he published various works drawing upon the research carried out in his expedition. He was a friend of Seth Ward and was able to help him succeed to the chair that he had been forced to vacate.
Seth Ward	1649–1660	University of Cambridge (Sidney Sussex College)	Wadham College and Trinity College	When still an undergraduate, Ward impressed John Bainbridge (the first astronomy professor) during a mathematical disputation. Ward was appointed as university lecturer in mathematics at Cambridge in 1643, but was deprived of his fellowship in the following year for refusing to agree to the religious oaths required by the Parliamentary authorities. He spent the following years tutoring and improving his mathematical knowledge, before succeeding his friend John Greaves in the Savilian chair, with Greaves's assistance. University lectures in astronomy were resumed under Ward, who was the first Savilian professor to teach the Copernican discovery that the Earth and other planets revolved around the Sun. He studied comets and the movements of the planets, observing them from the room at the top of the tower of Wadham College in which he lived; he also preached and published theological works. He was elected Principal of Jesus College, Oxford, in 1657, but Oliver Cromwell installed Francis Howell instead, raising Ward's stipend as compensation. He was President of Trinity College, Oxford, from 1659 but resigned 1660 at The Restoration in favour of his ejected predecessor; he also gave up the professorship in the same year. He later became Bishop of Exeter and then Bishop of Salisbury, where he did much to restore the cathedrals, but did not continue his astronomical studies.
Christopher Wren	1661–1673	Wadham College	All Souls College	As an undergraduate, Wren joined the circle of mathematicians and natural scientists at Wadham under the leadership of the Warden, John Wilkins. He developed an interest for telescopes and astronomy, building with Wilkins an 80-foot (24 m) long instrument to observe the Moon in 1655. Oliver Cromwell appointed Wren in 1657 as Professor of Geometry at Gresham College, London, on the recommendation of Wilkins; Wren lectured on Saturn (the appearance and phases of which he had earlier studied), Kepler's works, light, and lenses. He provided partial solutions in 1658 to problems relating to curves set by Blaise Pascal, the answers to which would help calculations for planetary orbits. He resigned from Gresham College upon his appointment to the Savilian chair, lecturing on topics such as spheres and navigation. He developed an interest in architecture from his mathematical studies, with early work including the chapel of Pembroke College, Cambridge, and the Sheldonian Theatre in Oxford. His architectural skills led to his role in rebuilding London after the Great Fire of 1666 (including St Paul's Cathedral) and his appointment as Surveyor of the King's Works in 1669. Isaac Newton described him as "one of the foremost geometers of this age". Wren appointed Edward Bernard as his deputy in the chair in 1669, on his appointment as Surveyor of the King's Works, and Bernard succeeded him four years later.
Edward Bernard	1673–1691	St John's College	St John's College	Bernard studied Hebrew, Arabic, Syriac and Coptic with Edward Pococke (Laudian Professor of Arabic at the university) and mathematics with John Wallis (Savilian Professor of Geometry). When Christopher Wren was appointed as Surveyor of the King's Works in 1669, he appointed Bernard as his deputy in the astronomy chair; he succeeded Wren in 1673 and was elected a Fellow of the Royal Society on the same day. Bernard's interests, as demonstrated in his lectures, were more in ancient mathematics and astronomy than in modern developments; he published comparatively few works. Tiring of his academic duties, he moved to Paris to tutor two of the illegitimate sons of King Charles II, the Duke of Grafton and the Duke of Northumberland, but returned after falling out with their mother, the King's mistress. He unsuccessfully sought other positions abroad, including the chair of Arabic at the University of Leiden. He resigned in 1691 when appointed to a lucrative parish position as rector of Brightwell-cum-Sotwell near Oxford.
David Gregory	1691–1708	Marischal College and University of Aberdeen, and Leiden University	Balliol College	Gregory studied in his native Scotland and befriended the Edinburgh physician Archibald Pitcairne before travelling through Europe and continuing his education. He inherited the papers of his uncle James Gregory, a mathematician and astronomer, which he studied carefully. He succeeded his uncle at the University of Edinburgh in 1683, giving a history of the progress of mathematics as his inaugural lecture. In 1690, Gregory refused to swear an oath of loyalty to the regime of William III and Mary II but was not removed from his post. He enlisted the support of Isaac Newton and John Flamsteed, the Astronomer Royal, in his efforts to obtain the Oxford chair, and was elected in December 1691, becoming a Fellow of Balliol and obtaining an Oxford doctorate in February 1692. As professor, he lectured less often than required by the terms of his appointment, and covered only relatively uncomplicated material rather than Newton's work. He moved to London in 1704 and was appointed overseer of the Scottish Mint in 1707 to supervise recoinage in Scotland. He died in 1708. He has been described as "not a notable observational astronomer", but instead a talented "correspondent, communicator and teacher".
John Caswell	1709–12	Wadham College	Hart Hall	Caswell matriculated at Wadham College, Oxford, when he was 16 years old, and studied with John Wallis (Savilian Professor of Geometry). He worked with the cartographer John Adams on the survey of England and Wales that Adams began in the late 17th century. He was also vice-principal of Hart Hall, and wrote a book on trigonometry.
John Keill	1712–1721	University of Edinburgh and Balliol College	Balliol College (Note: Keill was a member of Balliol, but there is no record in Alumni Oxoniensis that he was appointed to a fellowship of the college.)	Keill studied in Edinburgh with David Gregory and moved to Balliol with him in 1691 when Gregory was appointed as the Savilian astronomy professor. An accomplished pupil of Gregory, Keill was the first to teach a course on Newtonian principles at Oxford or Cambridge, lecturing in experimental philosophy at Hart Hall. He began deputising for Thomas Millington (Sedleian Professor of Natural Philosophy) in 1699 but after Millington died in 1704 Keill was not appointed as his successor, nor were his hopes of succeeding Gregory realised. After serving in various government roles, including decipherer to Queen Anne, he was elected to succeed Carswell. Described as "one of the most influential natural philosophers in Britain" for his work on Newtonian principles. He was one of the first to suggest that there might be attractions between invisible particles within matter that caused states such as elasticity and fluidity. His publications included his lectures on astronomy.
James Bradley	1721–1762	Balliol College	— (Note: There is no mention in Alumni Oxoniensis of Bradley holding a college fellowship.)	Bradley was the nephew of James Pound, a leading astronomer who was a colleague of Edmond Halley and Isaac Newton, and helped his uncle with his observations near London even when Bradley was appointed as vicar of a church in Monmouthshire. He had a particular interest in the moons of Jupiter, correcting errors in published astronomical tables, Mars and nebulae, and was highly regarded by Halley. Bradley resigned as a clergyman on appointment to the chair in 1721. His major discovery, in 1725, was the aberration of light, in which stars appeared to move position as the Earth moved, which led him to be able to calculate the speed of light and the time it took to travel from the Sun to the Earth. He moved to the Savilian professors' house in 1732, and succeeded Halley as Astronomer Royal in 1742, improving the state of the buildings and instruments at the Greenwich observatory. His continued observations on the positions of the stars (to help with navigation), the Moon, and comets led to the discovery of nutation: the "nodding" of the Earth on its axis as it travelled around the Sun. He recorded observations for 18 years to measure the phenomenon, which helped to show (as Newton argued) that the Earth was flatter at the poles. He was awarded the Copley Medal of the Royal Society for this work. He carried on his astronomical observations, receiving many honours from home and abroad, until his death in 1762. Legal disputes about whether the state or his inheritors owned his papers led to a long delay in publication of his papers, but they eventually formed the starting point for further important work about the positions of the stars.
Thomas Hornsby	1763–1810	Corpus Christi College	Corpus Christi College	Hornsby, who had an observatory at Corpus Christi, gained a high reputation for his lectures, and was the first Savilian astronomy professor required to provide courses each year. He presented papers about the transits of Venus in 1761 and 1769 and the solar eclipse of 1764 to the Royal Society, of which he was a Fellow. He proposed that an observatory should be built at Oxford for the professor, and construction of the Radcliffe Observatory (and an adjoining house for him) began in 1772. The observatory began operation in 1774 and was completed in 1797. He was called upon to prepare the papers of his predecessor, James Bradley, for publication, but ill-health and his other duties as astronomy professor, experimental philosophy professor (from 1763), Sedleian Professor of Natural Philosophy (from 1782) and Radcliffe Librarian (from 1783) caused delays. He has been described as "a lucid lecturer" and "a remarkably accurate observer".
Abraham Robertson	1810–1826	Christ Church	Christ Church (Note: Robertson was a chaplain of Christ Church before the college appointed him as vicar of a parish in Northampton, but he continued to reside in Oxford. There is no record in Alumni Oxoniensis of him holding a college fellowship.)	Robertson started studying at Oxford aged 24, having previously run (unsuccessfully) an evening school in Oxford for mechanics. He was supported by John Smith (Savilian Professor of Geometry 1766–96), for whom he deputised in 1784 before succeeding him in 1797. He held the post of Radcliffe Observer in addition to the astronomy chair. Robertson was well-regarded as a lecturer, noted for his clarity and the assistance he gave in encouraging students. He was elected as a Fellow of the Royal Society in 1795 to mark his work on conic sections (the subject of his main work, Sectionum conicarum libri septem, in 1792) and his "literary attainments and diligence in the pursuit of science". He also oversaw publication of an edition of the works of Archimedes.
Stephen Rigaud	1827–1839	Exeter College	— (Note: Rigaud was a Fellow of Exeter College until 1810; thereafter he is not recorded in Alumni Oxoniensis as holding a college appointment.)	Rigaud, whose father was the observer at Kew Observatory, made his first recorded observations in astronomy when at Exeter College, and was elected to a fellowship of the college when still an undergraduate. From about 1805, he substituted for Thomas Hornsby, astronomy professor and reader in experimental philosophy, because of Hornsby's illness. When Abraham Robertson succeeded Hornsby in 1810, Rigaud was appointed as Savilian Professor of Geometry; he succeeded his father at Kew in 1814, becoming joint observer with his grandfather. He succeeded Robertson in the astronomy and experimental philosophy positions in 1827. His wife died in the same year, and Rigaud devoted himself to his children and his work; he has been described as "the foremost historian of astronomy and mathematics in his generation", and as "renowned for his personal and scholarly integrity".
George Johnson	1839–1842	The Queen's College	The Queen's College	Johnson was a mathematician and priest with little practical knowledge of astronomy. His appointment led to the Radcliffe Trust, which oversaw the Radcliffe Observatory, appointing Manuel Johnson as the Radcliffe Observer instead. George Johnson became White's Professor of Moral Philosophy in 1842 and then Dean of Wells in 1854, where his time was marred by a dispute about his unpopular decision to hold a parish position in Wells in addition to the deanery to supplement his income.
William Donkin	1842–1869	St Edmund Hall and University College	University College	Donkin, a talented linguist, mathematician and musician, published papers on various astronomical and mathematical topics, including the movements of the Moon. He found new ways of solving Laplace's equation and applied his mathematical knowledge to questions of acoustics, although he did not finish a proposed book on the topic before his death.
Charles Pritchard	1870–1893	University of Cambridge (St John's College)	New College (Note: Pritchard became a member of New College in 1870 and was appointed to a college fellowship in 1883.)	After leaving Cambridge, Pritchard was headmaster of a grammar school in Stockwell, south London, but left after a year because of disagreements with the school's owners about his wish to teach science. His reforms were popular with some of the parents, however, and they established a school for him nearby in Clapham, where he was headmaster from 1834 to 1862 and installed an observatory and other scientific equipment. He was a member, and later president, of the Royal Astronomical Society, taking part in observations and the 1860 expedition to Spain to observe the solar eclipse. An ordained priest, he was appointed Hulsean lecturer at Cambridge in 1867, but never held a parish post. At the age of 62, he was appointed to the Savilian chair and (in the words of the Oxford Dictionary of National Biography) "entered upon his new duties with the ardour of youth". During his time in the position, an observatory was built in the University Parks, making Oxford one of the leading observatories in Europe. His use of photography to assist his observations and calculations of stellar parallax was rewarded with the Gold Medal of the Royal Astronomical Society (1886) and the Royal Medal of the Royal Society (1892).
Herbert Turner	1893–1930	University of Cambridge (Trinity College)	New College	Turner was second wrangler (achieved the second-highest marks in the Cambridge mathematics examinations) in 1882, and became chief assistant at the Royal Greenwich Observatory in 1884. He was involved with an international project to conduct a photographic survey and catalogue of stars, and devised a method of calculating a star's true position, making the work much easier. This was recognised by the award of the Bruce Medal of the Astronomical Society of the Pacific (1927). After his appointment to the Oxford professorship, his attempts to have a house built for him at the university's observatory were unsuccessful, as the dispute between the university and the Radcliffe Observatory that had begun with George Johnson's appointment in 1839 continued. He supported the decision of the Radcliffe trustees to move their observatory to a better site, in South Africa, in 1929, but was attacked by fellow Oxford academics in the struggles for improving science facilities at the university thereafter. He was heavily involved in the work of the Royal Astronomical Society and international astronomical groups, and developed interests in geophysics and seismology, where he was one of the first to suggest that the Earth's core was liquid.
Harry Plaskett	1932–1960	University of Toronto and Imperial College, London	New College	Plaskett, a solar physicist, was the son of the Canadian astronomer John Stanley Plaskett. After serving in the Canadian Corps during the First World War, he studied spectroscopy with Alfred Fowler at Imperial College for a few months before taking up an appointment under his father at the Dominion Astrophysical Observatory, British Columbia. He taught at Harvard College from 1928, becoming professor of astrophysics in 1930, and concentrated on solar research (which he preferred to lecturing). During this time he met the Oxford mathematician and astrophysicist Edward Arthur Milne, and they became close friends. On the death of Herbert Turner in 1930, Milne warned Plaskett about the antiquated observatory at Oxford and the lack of university support and resources for the work of the Savilian professor, but Plaskett was undeterred and was appointed to the position. He constructed England's first solar tower telescope to attract new researchers to Oxford, and reduced the work carried out at the observatory on seismology that Turner had begun, eliminating it in 1946. He ended undergraduate tuition at the observatory and, with Milne, set up the first school of astrophysics in the country, based on the teaching of graduate students through research initiatives. He retired in 1960, but continued his observations with his successor's permission until he turned eighty in 1973. Like his father, he was awarded the Gold Medal of the Royal Astronomical Society.
Donald Blackwell	1960–1988	University of Cambridge (Sidney Sussex College)	New College	Blackwell was assistant director of the Solar Physics Observatory at Cambridge from 1950 to 1960, when he took up the Savilian professorship. He was President of the Royal Astronomical Society from 1973 to 1975, and visited various countries for his research.
George Efstathiou	1988–1997	Keble College and the University of Durham	New College	After completing his studies at Oxford and Durham, Efstathiou worked as an astronomy research assistant at the University of California Berkeley for one year, then became a Fellow of King's College, Cambridge. Before his appointment as Savilian professor, he was Assistant Director of Research at the Institute of Astronomy, Cambridge. After nine years in Oxford, he returned to Cambridge to take up a professorship, and became Director of the university's Kavli Institute for Cosmology in 2008. He has been awarded the Maxwell Medal and Prize of the Institute of Physics (1990) and the Gruber Prize in Cosmology (2011).
Joseph Silk	1999–2012	University of Cambridge (Clare College) and Harvard University	New College	After obtaining his doctorate from Harvard, Silk returned to England to carry out research at the Institute of Astronomy, Cambridge. After a year at the Princeton University observatory, he moved to the University of California at Berkeley in 1970, becoming Professor of Astronomy in 1978. His astronomical interests include the formation of galaxies, dark matter detection, and temperature changes in space. His publications include The Big Bang (1980) and A Short History of the Universe (1994).
Steven Balbus	2012–	Massachusetts Institute of Technology and the University of California, Berkeley	New College	Balbus received degrees in mathematics and physics from the Massachusetts Institute of Technology (MIT), his PhD in physics from the University of California at Berkeley, and held postdoctoral positions at MIT and Princeton University. He joined the faculty of the University of Virginia in 1985, and moved to the École Normale Supérieure de Paris in 2004, accepting the Savilian Chair in the spring of 2012. Balbus is a theoretical astrophysicist with research interests in gasdynamical processes, and is known for his work with John F. Hawley on turbulence in accretion disks. He was the recipient of a Chaire d'excellence in 2004, and has been a Spitzer Lecturer at Princeton University and a Miller Visiting Professor at UC Berkeley. For his work on accretion disks, Balbus shared the 2013 Shaw Prize in Astronomy with Hawley.

== See also ==
- List of professorships at the University of Oxford
