= David Gregory (mathematician) =

Scottish mathematician and astronomer

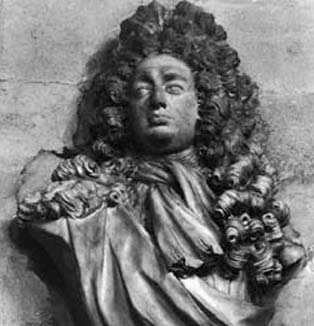
- Born: 3 June 1659; Aberdeen, Scotland
- Died: 10 October 1708 (aged 49); Maidenhead, Berkshire, England
- Education: Marischal College, University of Aberdeen; University of Leiden
- Known for: Development of infinite series
- Scientific career
- Fields: Mathematics
- Workplaces: University of Edinburgh; Balliol College, Oxford
- Notable students: John Keill; John Craig

Notes
- He is the nephew of James Gregory.

David Gregory (originally spelt Gregorie) FRS (3 June 1659 – 10 October 1708) was a Scottish mathematician and astronomer. He was professor of mathematics at the University of Edinburgh, and later Savilian Professor of Astronomy at the University of Oxford, and a proponent of Isaac Newton's Principia.

== Biography ==
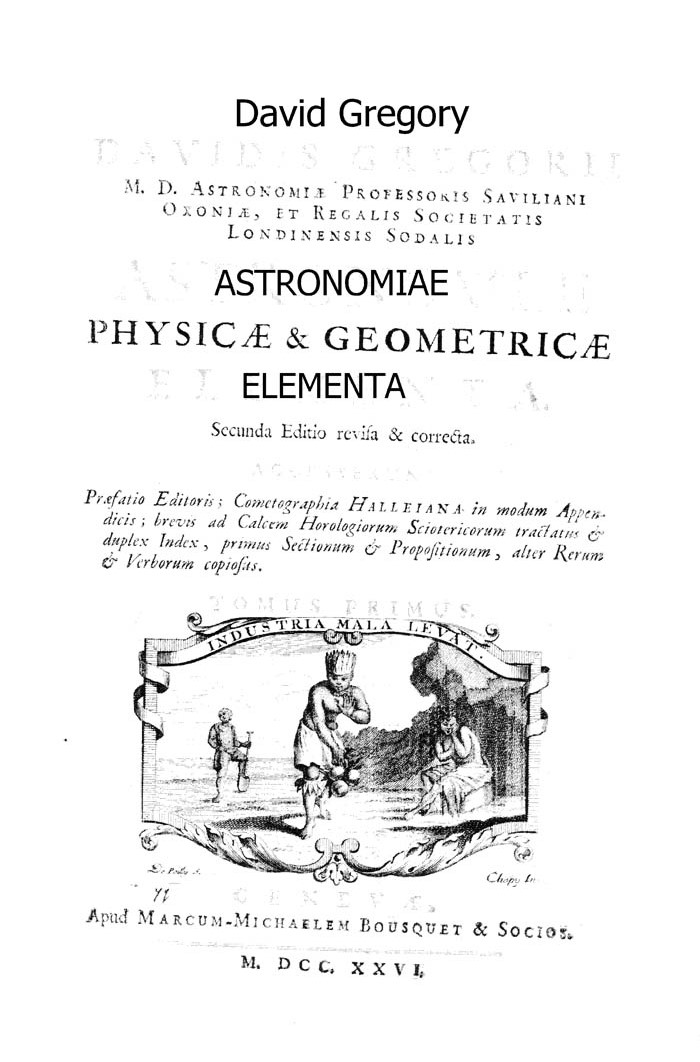
Astronomiae physicae et geometricae elementa, 1726

The fourth of the fifteen children of David Gregorie, a doctor from Kinnairdy, Banffshire, and Jean Walker of Orchiston, David was born in Upper Kirkgate, Aberdeen. The nephew of astronomer and mathematician James Gregory, David, like his influential uncle before him, studied at Aberdeen Grammar School and Marischal College (University of Aberdeen), from 1671 to 1675. The Gregorys were Jacobites and left Scotland to escape religious discrimination. Young David visited several countries on the continent, including the Netherlands (where he began studying medicine at Leiden University) and France, and did not return to Scotland until 1683.

On 28 November 1683, Gregory graduated M.A. at University of Edinburgh, and in October 1683 he became Chair of Mathematics at University of Edinburgh. He was "the first to openly teach the doctrines of the Principia, in a public seminary...in those days this was a daring innovation."

Gregory decided to leave for England where, in 1691, he was elected Savilian Professor of Astronomy at the University of Oxford, due in large part to the influence of Isaac Newton. The same year he was elected to be a Fellow of the Royal Society. In 1692, he was elected a Fellow of Balliol College, Oxford.

Gregory spent several days with Isaac Newton in 1694, discussing revisions for a second edition of Newton's Principia. Gregory made notes of these discussions, but the second edition of 1713 was not due to Gregory.

In 1695 he published Catoptricae et dioptricae sphaericae elementa which addressed chromatic aberration and the possibility of its correction with achromatic lens.

In 1705 Gregory became an Honorary Fellow of the Royal College of Physicians of Edinburgh. At the Union of 1707, he was given the responsibility of re-organising the Scottish Mint. He was an uncle of philosopher Thomas Reid.

Gregory and his wife, Elizabeth Oliphant, had nine children, but seven died while still children.

On his death in Maidenhead, Berkshire he was buried in Maidenhead churchyard.

== Works ==
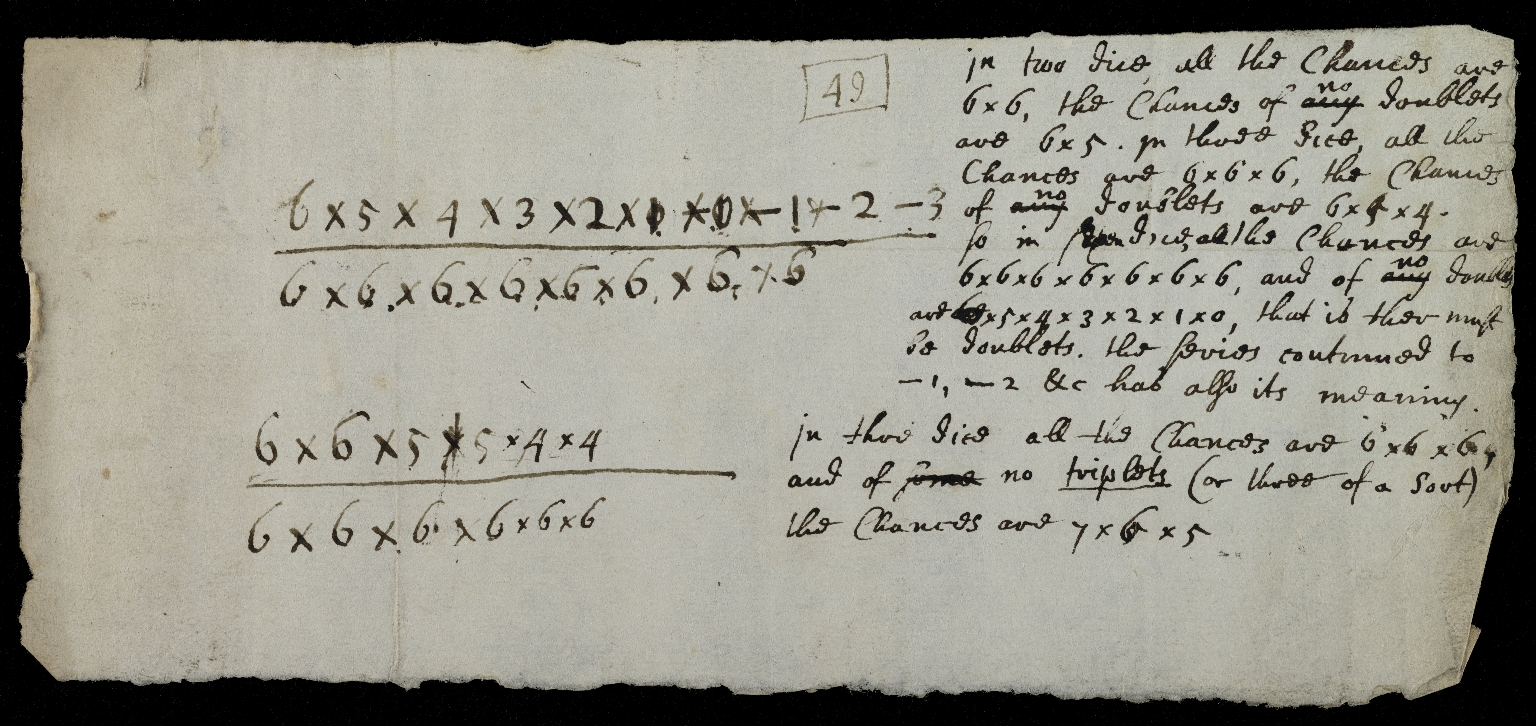
Hand-written note on game theory, from the papers of David Greory.

- 1684: Exercitatio geometrica de dimensione figurarum, via Google Books
- 1695: Catoptricæ et dioptricæ sphæricæ elementa - digital facsimile from the Linda Hall Library
- 1703: (editor) Euclides quae supersunt omnia (collected works of Euclid)
- Gregory, David (1726). Astronomiae physicae et geometricae elementa: Secunda Editio revisa & correcta (in Latin). Genevæ: Apud Marcum-Michaelem Bousquet & Socios.
- 1745: (Colin Maclaurin editor) Treatise of Practical Geometry via Internet Archive
