= Academy Royale International =

Educational organisation in Oxford, England

- Formerly: Oxford Royale Academy
- Type: Private
- Industry: Education
- Founded: 2004
- Headquarters: The Punt House, St Catherine's College, Oxford, United Kingdom
- Website: www.academyroyaleinternational.com

Academy Royale International (ARI) (formerly known as Oxford Royale Academy (ORA)) is an educational organisation based in Oxford, United Kingdom.

== History ==
The Academy was established in 2004 by alumni of the Universities of Oxford, Cambridge and London. The organisation was founded in the city of Oxford, where it has provided educational courses each summer since it was established.

ORA is now based at St Catherine's College, one of the constituent colleges of the University of Oxford. It was located at Yarnton Manor, in Yarnton, Oxfordshire, between 2014 and 2021. ORA acquired Yarnton Manor from the Oxford Centre for Hebrew and Jewish Studies in September 2014.

In September 2026, the organisation rebranded from Oxford Royale Academy to Academy Royale International, announcing an expansion of its international portfolio.

== Awards ==
ORA was included in the list of winners of the Queen's Awards for Enterprise 2012, in the International Trade category. This was in recognition of growing student enrolments.

ORA won a second Queen's Awards for Enterprise in 2016 and a third in 2019.

ORA also won a King's Awards for Enterprise in 2024.

It was also awarded Best Educational Product at the annual British Youth Travel Awards from 2010, 2011, 2012, 2013 and 2015. ORA was chosen based on a range of criteria including customer service; quality of content; creativity in business thinking; improving or innovating a product; and commitment to health and safety.

ORA was also named as a finalist for this award in 2016 and 2017.

ORA is accredited by the British Council and the British Accreditation Council (BAC), and is a member of the World Youth Student & Educational Travel Confederation (WYSE), EnglishUK and StudyUK. In February 2012, Oxford Royale Academy became a supporting member of the Council of British International Schools. Its courses are also accredited by City and Guilds.

== Oxbridge campuses ==
ORA contracts with institutions such as the University of Oxford and the University of Cambridge, to use their facilities and also hires instructors from these institutions. However, it operates independently and not under the universities' aegis.

In Oxford, ORA students reside in St. Peter's College, St. Catherine's College, Balliol College (including their Jowett Walk annexe), St Hugh's College, Merton College, University College, Lady Margaret Hall, and The Queen's College.

In Cambridge, St Catharine's College, Clare College, St Edmund's College form the three current colleges where ORA students can live and take classes.

In addition to operating its summer courses in Oxford and Cambridge, ORA also offers summer programmes in London, Ascot, and St Andrews. For the first time in July 2018, ORA also offered programs in the United States, including courses at Yale University and Stanford University.
