= Mansfield Road, Oxford =

Road in central Oxford, England

Coordinates: 51.7572°N 1.2520°W

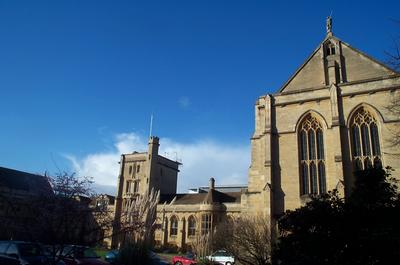
Mansfield College on Mansfield Road.

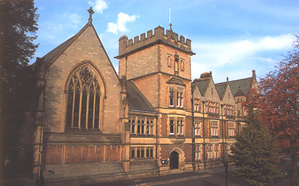
Harris Manchester College on Mansfield Road.

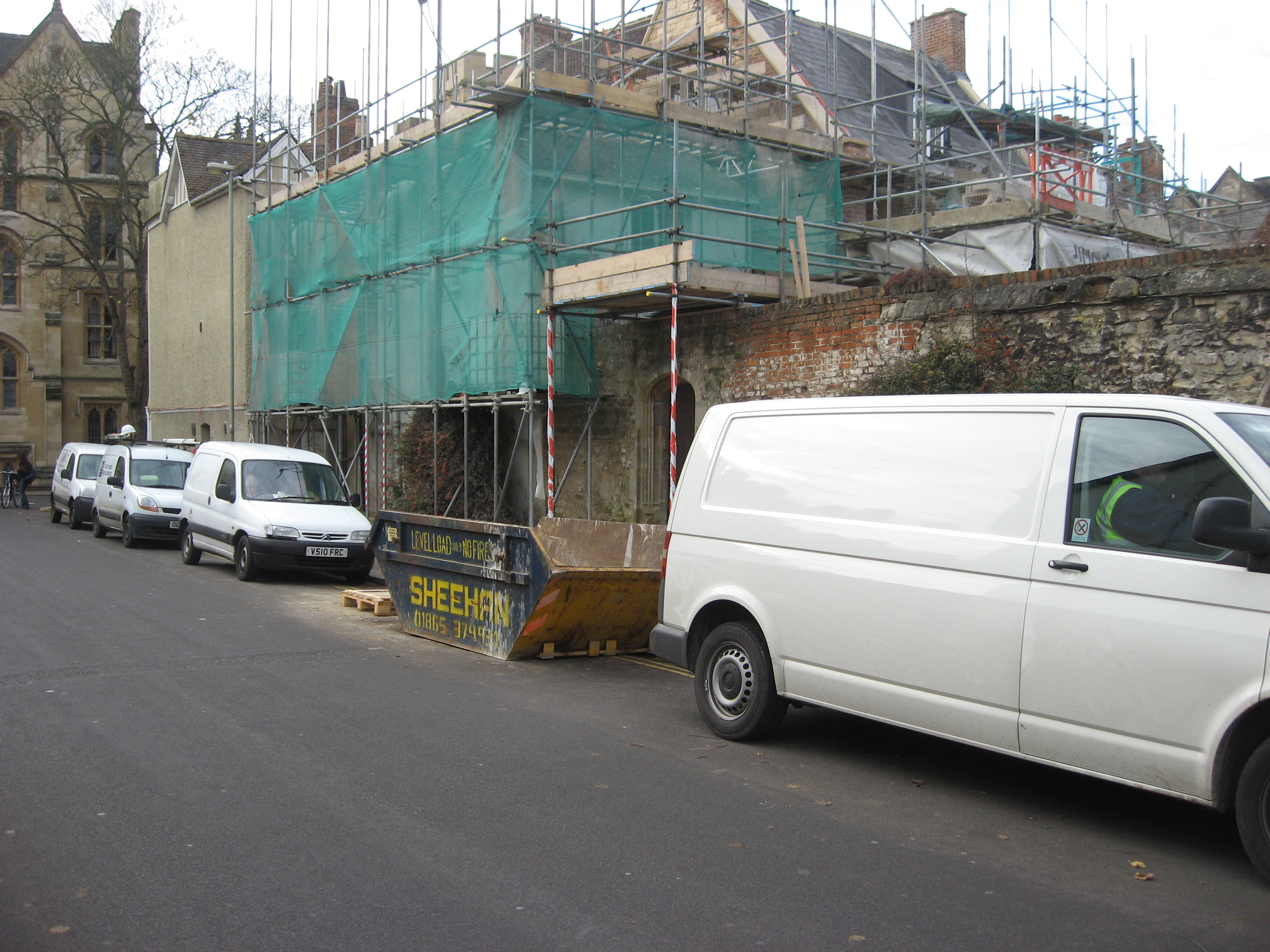
Building work at the southern end of Mansfield Road.

Location of Mansfield Road within central Oxford

Mansfield Road is a road in central Oxford, England. It runs north–south with two of Oxford University's colleges on it, Mansfield College and Harris Manchester College, and Queen Elizabeth House which houses the Oxford Department of International Development.

To the north is South Parks Road and the university's main Science Area. To the south is Holywell Street. Also off this road to the east near its southern end is Jowett Walk, named after Benjamin Jowett, a Master of Balliol College in Victorian times. On the northern corner with Jowett Walk is the former Geography Department of the university, since 2006 the Oxford Department of International Development (No. 3 Mansfield Road).

Savile Road is a cul-de-sac to the west with New College School (associated with New College in Holywell Street close by) just to the north. The University Club sports ground, for use by graduate students and University staff, is based on Mansfield Road, and hosts a football team named after the road, Mansfield Road Football Club, playing in the Morrells of Oxford Premier League, and the Mansfield Road Cricket Club, or Oxford University Club Cricket Club (OUCCC).

The Oxford University Club Hurriers (OUCH) were formerly known as the Mansfield Road Runners.

Halifax House, a social club for people associated with Oxford University, was located to the east of the northern end of Mansfield Road at 8 South Parks Road from 1961. The building has since been demolished to make way for new university science facilities. Evidence of Bronze Age barrows together with later prehistoric and early Roman field systems was found on the site.

== Mansfield Road Club ==
The Mansfield Road Club was established in 1960 by Jack Cox and Rupert Cecil as a successor to the informal staff club which first met in the old Zoology Department in the Oxford University Museum of Natural History, and which later moved to a basement room in Keble Road. Jack Cox joined the Biochemistry Department in 1926 at the age of 15, and retired after 50 years' service in 1976. He was responsible for designing attachments for the Svedberg ultracentrifuge and other specialized equipment, and in 1978 he was awarded an MA for services to Oxford University. A twenty-over cricket competition, the Jack Cox Cup, is now played each year in recognition of his contribution to the club.
