= Jowett Walk =

Road in central Oxford, England

Coordinates: 51.7555°N 1.2502°W

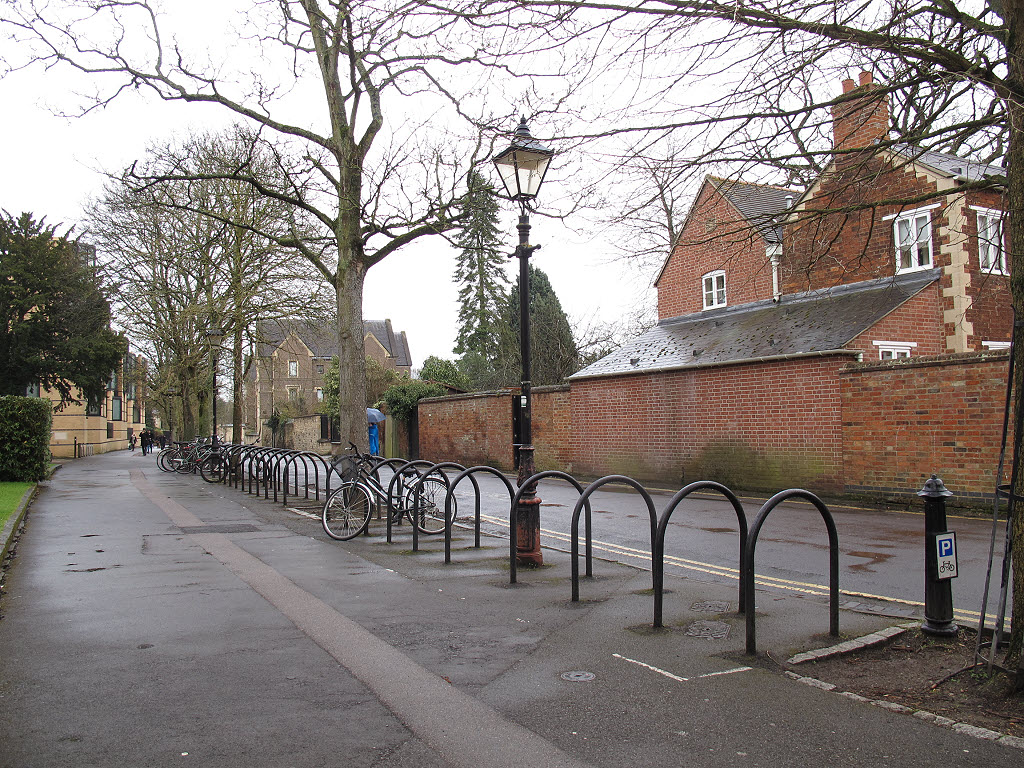
Looking along Jowett Walk

Jowett Walk is a road in central Oxford, England. It connects Mansfield Road to the west with St Cross Road to the east, running parallel with and north of Holywell Street.

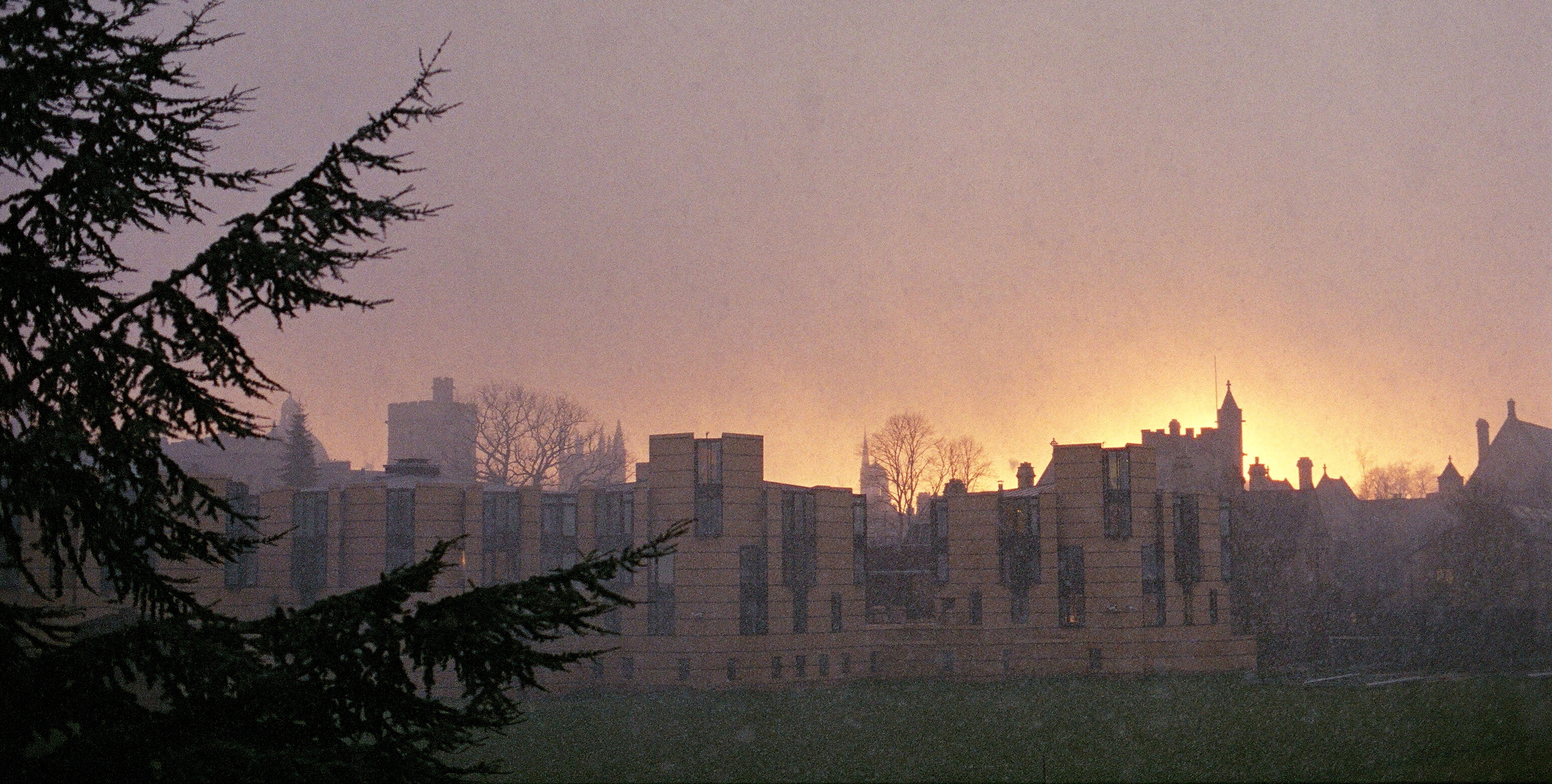
View of Balliol College buildings on Jowett Walk

The road was formerly named Love Lane and used to continue north to South Parks Road on what is now Mansfield Road. It is now named after the well-known Victorian Master of Balliol College, Benjamin Jowett (1817–1893). Much of the land in the area is owned by Balliol College, including the playing fields to the north and student housing. The Michael Pilch Studio, owned by Balliol College, is a black box theatre located in Jowett Walk.

Merton College has a graduate annexe to the south of Jowett Walk at the eastern end. The Oxford Department of International Development is on the corner with Mansfield Road.
