= Michael Pilch Studio =

Studio theatre in Oxford, England

- Interactive map of Michael Pilch Studio
- Full name: The Michael Pilch Studio Theatre
- Address: Jowett Buildings, Jowett Walk; Oxford OX1 3TS; United Kingdom
- Coordinates: 51.75569°N 1.25046°W
- Owner: Balliol College, Oxford
- Operator: Balliol College Drama Society
- Seating type: Flip-up seats
- Capacity: 50–90 (typically 70)
- Type: Studio theatre

Construction
- Built: 1996
- Opened: 1997
- Renovated: 2016
- Architect: MJP Architects

Website
- pilchstudio.com No Longer Correct

The Michael Pilch Studio is a theatre in Oxford, England. It opened in 1997, has a capacity of 50–90 people depending on the configuration, and is located on Jowett Walk in central Oxford, England.

The theatre was built as part of a phased development of buildings by Balliol College, mainly for student accommodation, on Jowett Walk during 1996–2004 (Phase 1 completed September 1996, Phase 2 completed July 2004), undertaken by MJP Architects.

As a "black box" studio, the theatre is suitable for in-the-round staging and other non-standard layouts. It run by Balliol College Drama Society and is owned by Balliol College. The theatre is named after Michael Pilch (1927–2021), who was the benefactor who enabled the theatre to be built. The theatre stages a variety of productions, including Shakespeare. The theatre was renovated in 2016.

== See also ==
- Burton Taylor Theatre
- Old Fire Station Theatre
- Oxford Playhouse
