= Balliol College, Oxford =

College of the University of Oxford

Balliol College
- University of Oxford
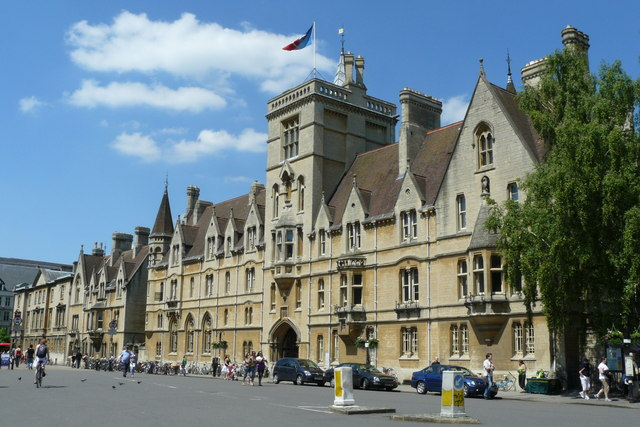

- Arms: Azure, a lion rampant argent, crowned or, impaling Gules, an orle argent
- Location: Broad Street, Oxford
- Coordinates: 51.7547°N 1.2578°W
- Full name: The Master and Scholars of Balliol College in the University of Oxford
- Latin name: Collegium Balliolensis, Collegium de Balliolo
- Established: 1263; 763 years ago
- Named for: John I de Balliol
- Sister college: St John's College, Cambridge
- Master: Seamus Perry
- Undergraduates: c.395 (2023)
- Postgraduates: c.405 (2023)
- Endowment: £146 m (2023)
- Website: balliol.ox.ac.uk
- JCR: www.ballioljcr.org
- MCR: www.balliolmcr.com
- Boat club: Balliol College Boat Club

Map
- Location within Oxford city centre

Balliol College (/ˈbeɪliəl/ BAY-lee-əl) is a constituent college of the University of Oxford, England. Founded in 1263 by nobleman John I de Balliol, it has a claim to be the oldest college in Oxford and the English-speaking world.

With a governing body of a master and around 80 fellows, the college's main buildings are located on Broad Street with additional buildings to the east in Jowett Walk and Holywell Manor. As one of the larger colleges of Oxford University, Balliol typically has around 400 of both undergraduates and graduates. The college pioneered the PPE degree in the 1920s.

Balliol has notable alumni from a wide range of disciplines. These include 13 Nobel Prize winners and 4 British prime ministers.

== History ==
=== Foundation and origins ===
Balliol College was founded in about 1263 by John I de Balliol under the guidance of Walter of Kirkham, the Bishop of Durham. According to legend, the founder had abducted the bishop as part of a land dispute and as a penance he was publicly beaten by the bishop and had to support a group of scholars at Oxford. After de Balliol's death in 1268, his widow, Dervorguilla of Galloway (their son would go on to become King of Scotland), made arrangements to ensure the permanence of the college in that she provided capital and in 1282 formulated the college statutes, documents that survive to the present.

Balliol lays claim to being the oldest Oxford college, though this is disputed by both University College and Merton. Balliol's claim is that a house of scholars was established by the founder in Oxford in around 1263, in contrast to Merton, which was the first college to be granted an official statute in 1274, and University College, which, while provisionally founded by will in 1249, was only officially established around 1280. However, Balliol also acknowledges that the other two have legitimate claims on their respective bases, depending on what criteria are used to define the oldest.

=== Women at Balliol ===
For more than 700 years, Balliol College admitted men only. New College had in 1964 resolved to admit women, but had been prevented from doing so without the approval of the university, which averred that this would be detrimental to the existing women's colleges. On 2 June 1971, a consilium at Balliol voted 26–2 to admit women and at the subsequent college meeting on 6 December 1971 it was resolved 30–8 to admit women "as soon as the change in its Statutes permitting this was approved by the Privy Council". Permission was granted by the university on 8 March 1977. With the appointment of Carol Clark to a Tutorial Fellowship in Modern Languages in 1973, Balliol became the first ancient all-male college to appoint a female fellow.

Before the full admission of women as undergraduates, the college had decided to establish a co-educational graduate institution. The decision was made on 16 March 1964 and the senior tutor approached St Anne's College shortly after this. The creation of the Balliol–St Anne's Graduate Institution with St Anne's in 1967 led to the coeducation of men and women on the Holywell Manor site. Following the arrival of women at Balliol and men at St Anne's in 1979, the joint Graduate Institution was terminated in 1984 by the consent of both colleges. Holywell Manor is now solely a part of Balliol College.

In 1979, along with many other previously all-male colleges, Balliol accepted its first cohort of female students. One of the first woman undergraduates to live at Balliol was Elena Ceva-Valla, who arrived on 16 September 1979. Other female undergraduates who arrived that term were Cressida Dick, Katy Koralek and Penny Phillips. In 2010, the college unveiled a sundial in the Garden Quad commemorating the thirtieth anniversary of the admission of women to the college, inscribed with the phrase "About Time". The first portrait of a woman in hall since that of the co-founder, Dervorguilla of Galloway, was unveiled in 2012, depicting benefactor and Oxford Internet Institute founder Dame Stephanie Shirley. This portrait has since been joined by portraits of Carol Clark and the mathematician Dame Frances Kirwan.

In 2018, Dame Helen Ghosh succeeded Sir Drummond Bone to become the college's first female master. In the same year, Dame Frances Kirwan became the twentieth Savilian Professor of Geometry and the first woman to hold that post.

In 2021, students sent an open letter to the college and protested regarding their welfare following an alleged incident of sexual assault on a female graduate student that was covered by Al Jazeera English.

== Governance ==
=== Academics and fellows ===
Balliol has a more or less permanent teaching staff, known as fellows. The college statutes provide for various categories of fellows and these include both tutorial fellows and professorial fellows. Professorial fellows are professors and readers of the university who are allocated to the college by the university. One of these professorships is the Beit Professor of Commonwealth History, which is currently held by James Belich. The Professorship of Internet Studies is currently held by political scientist Philip N. Howard. Other professorships include the Boden Professor of Sanskrit and the Montague Burton Professor of International Relations. Official fellows are those who hold tutorial or administrative appointments in the college. There are also senior and junior research fellows. The college can also elect "distinguished persons" to honorary fellowships.

The fellows are supplemented by academics on short-term contracts. In addition, there are visiting international academics who come to Oxford for periods of up to a year, an example of this is the George Eastman Visiting Professorial Fellowship.

=== Masters ===
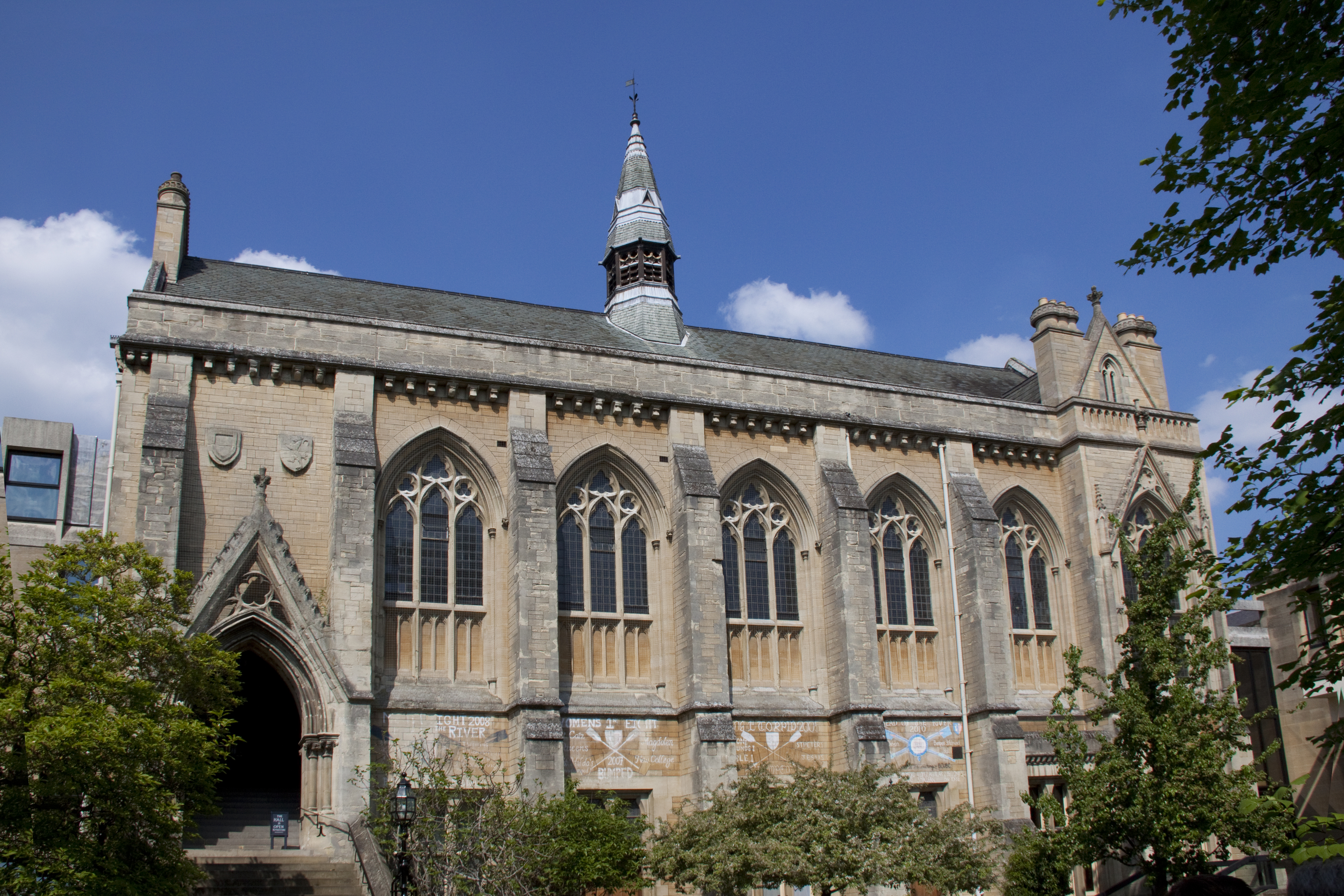
Balliol College Hall and SCR (from Fellows' Garden), Oxford

Balliol College is run by the master and fellows of the college. The master of the college must be "the person who is, in their [the Fellows] judgement, most fit for the government of the College as a place of religion, learning, and education". The current master is Professor Seamus Perry.

Although the rules in no way suggest there is a preference for an alumnus or fellow of the college to be chosen, there have been few who were not. Only one in the twentieth century had no previous connection. A former student of the college, Baruch Blumberg, was the first American master and the first Nobel Laureate, receiving his prize in medicine for the identification of the hepatitis B virus. The former Master of Balliol, Sir Drummond Bone, was a post-graduate student (Snell Exhibitioner from Glasgow University) and a scholar of the Romantic poet Lord Byron, and held the post from October 2011 to April 2018.

== Buildings and grounds ==
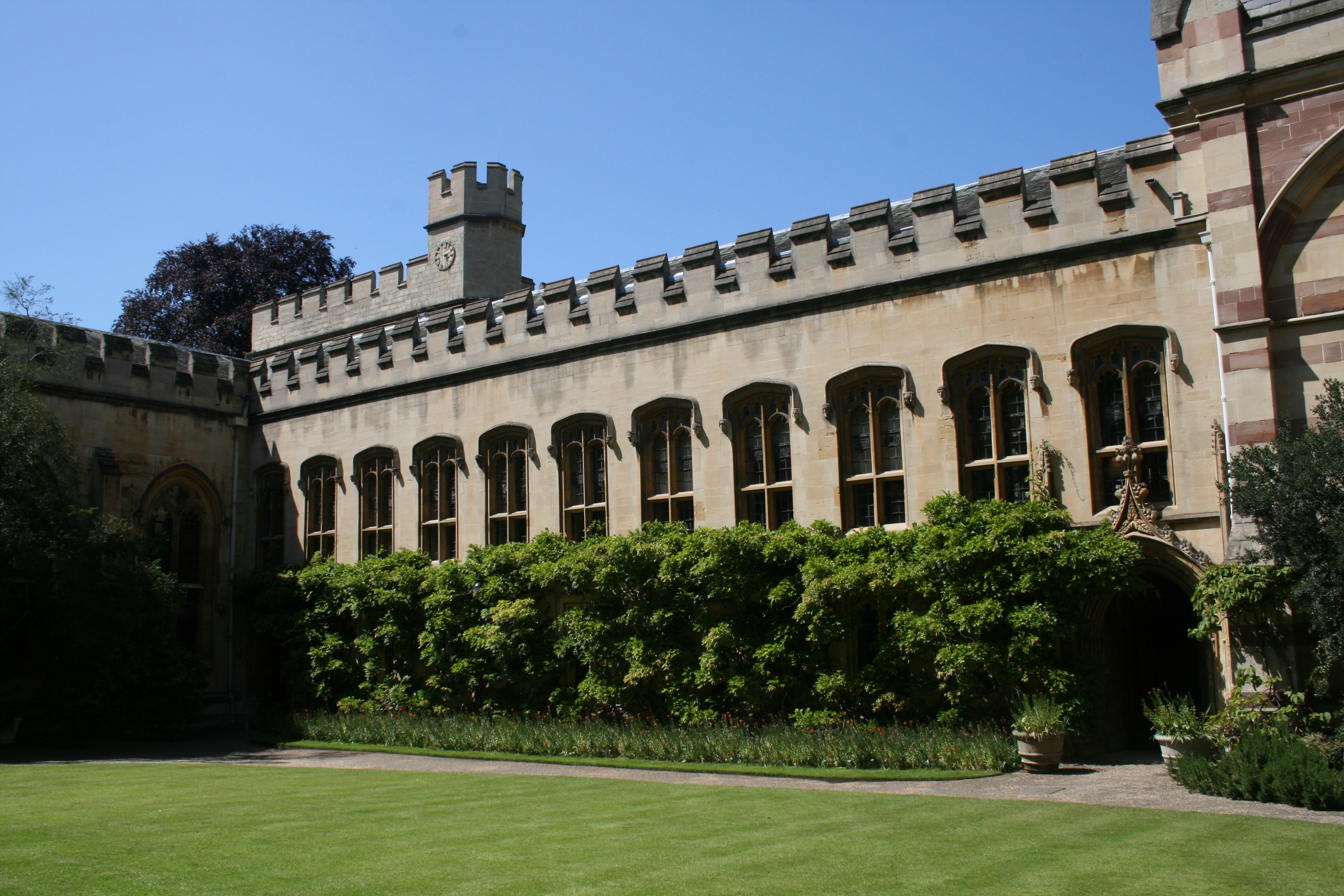
Front Quadrangle, Old Library

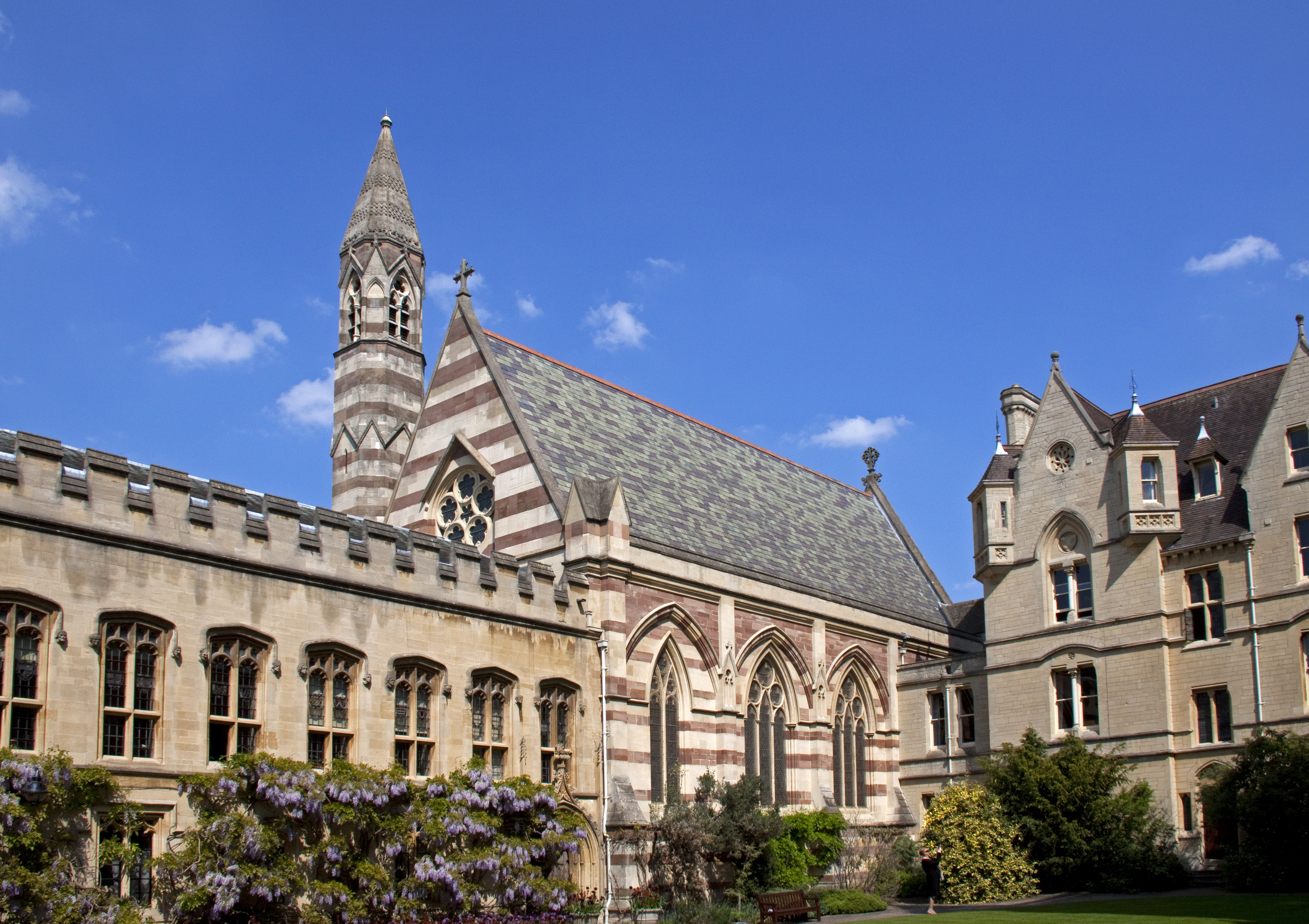
William Butterfield's chapel

The college has been on its present site since its inception by Balliol's scholars as their residence with 1263 considered the traditional "foundation" date.

=== Front quadrangle ===
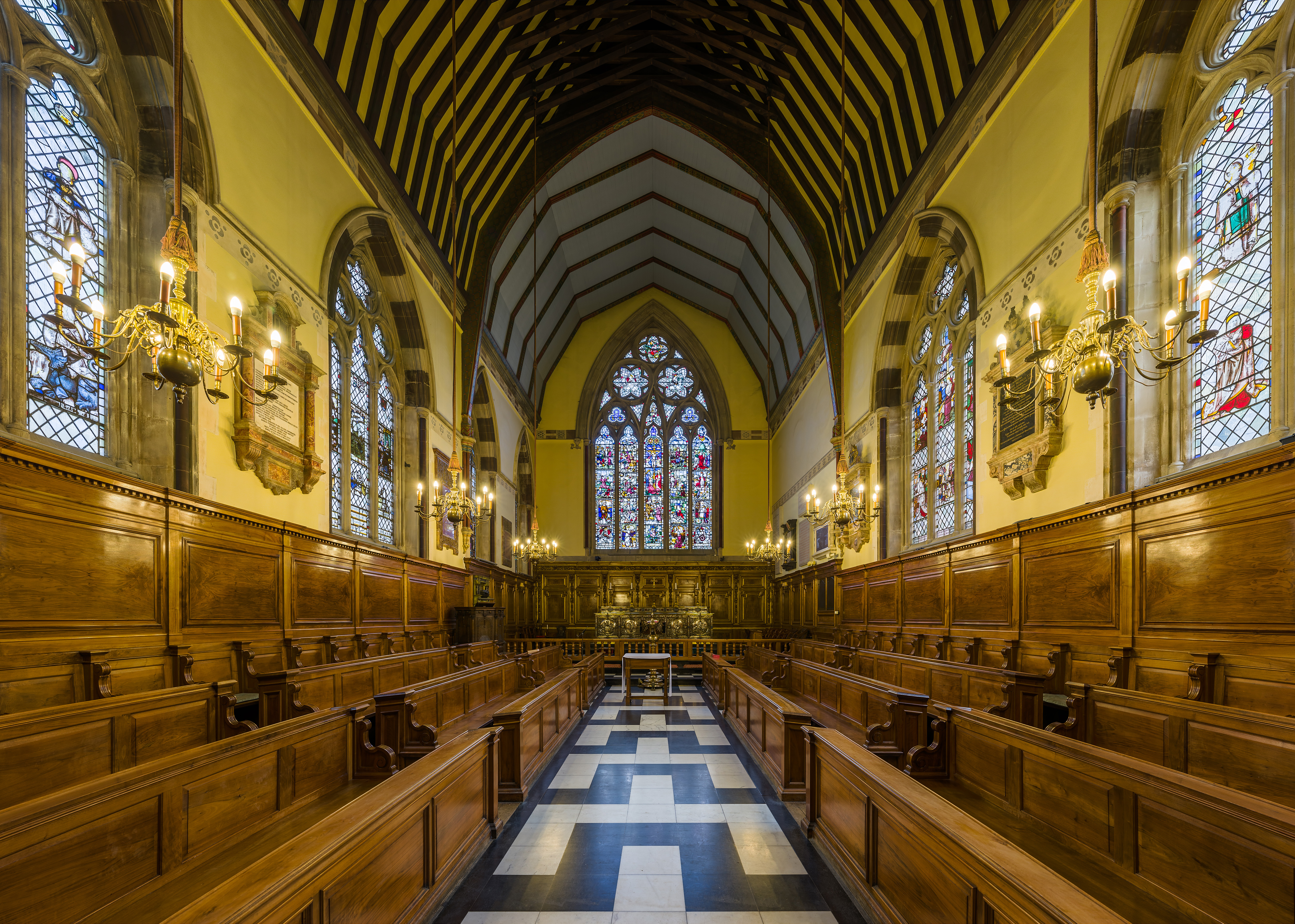
Interior of the chapel

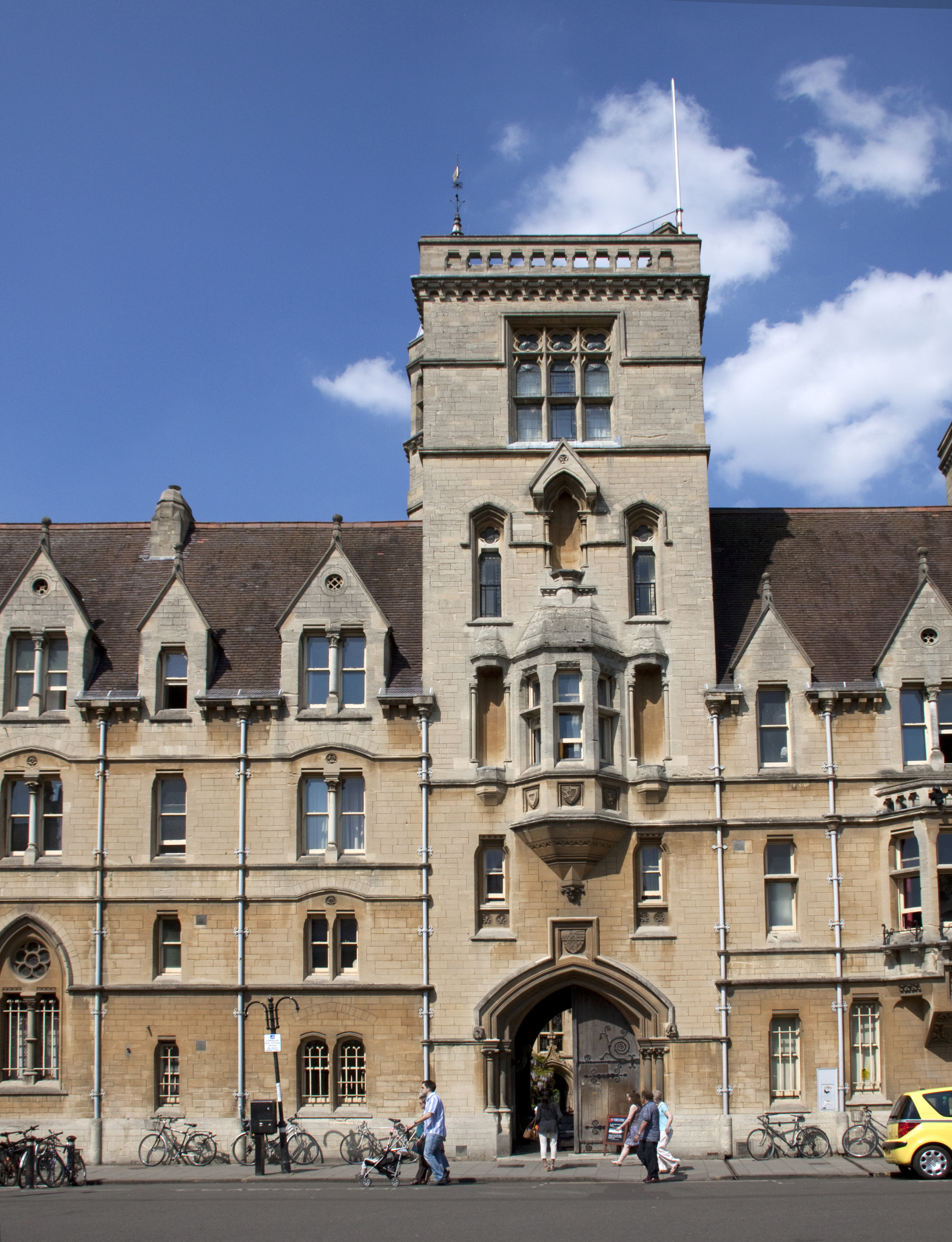
Gateway to Balliol, designed by Alfred Waterhouse

The oldest parts of the college are the north and west ranges of the front quadrangle, dated to 1431, respectively the medieval hall, west side, now the "new library" and the "old library" first floor north side. The ground floor is the Old Senior Common Room. Balliol's second library pre-dates the publication of printed books in Europe. There is a possibility that the original Master's Chamber, south west side, adorned with a fine oriel window, is earlier than these; it is now the Master's Dining Room.

William Grey, Bishop of Ely, was a benefactor of the college in the 15th century. Grey devoted much care to the collection of manuscripts, and wherever he lived constantly employed scribes to make copies of books he could not otherwise obtain. Many of these he had adorned with costly miniatures and initial letters by the skill of an artist who worked for him at Florence. It was his desire to make his collection the nucleus of a library for Balliol College, to the building of which, as well as to that of the master's lodgings and of the old buttery and hall, he contributed largely. The work was finished about 1477 by Robert Abdy, then master of the college, and enriched with some two hundred manuscripts, the bishop's gift. Of these, many were destroyed in the reign of Edward VI and during the great rebellion, and by Wood's time few of the miniatures in the remaining volumes had escaped mutilation. But by 1890, no less than 152 of Grey's codices were still in the possession of the college, and form a large part of Roger Mynors's 1963 catalogue of the college's manuscripts. The bishop's coat of arms (gules, a lion rampant, within a bordure engrailed argent) is displayed on two windows of the Old Library, and in the panels below the window of the Master's dining room. The chapel is the third (perhaps fourth) on the site and was designed by William Butterfield in 1857.

Alfred Waterhouse designed the main Broad Street frontage of the college (1867–68), along with gateway and tower, known as the Brackenbury Buildings after philanthropist and donor Hannah Brackenbury, replacing earlier structures (Staircases I–VII). The first staircase next to the chapel contains the organ scholar's lodgings.

=== New Inn Hall ===
Under a statute of 1881, New Inn Hall, one of the remaining medieval halls, was merged into Balliol College in 1887. Balliol acquired New Inn Hall's admissions and other records for 1831–1887 as well as the library of New Inn Hall, which largely contained 18th-century law books. The New Inn Hall site was later sold and is now part of St Peter's College, Oxford.

=== Garden Quadrangle ===
South-side is the front part of the Master's Lodgings on Broad Street from the Waterhouse improvements of the 1860s of the front quad. This building incorporates the original Master's chamber, seen in the old quadrangle, which is now the Master's dining room. The neighbour to this is the Fisher Building of 1759 (Stc X) The undistinguished looking Stc XI, south west side, is in fact the oldest structure in this quadrangle, 1720, originally intended as accommodation for scholars from Bristol, hence its name. Continuing the west-side Stc XII–XIV dates from 1826, by George Basevi, and marks the beginnings of the college's academic renaissance being required for the increasing number of commoners applying for places. Stc XV by Warren of 1912 filled in the last gap of the quadrangle; the ground floor and basement is the principal Junior Common Room. This obscures the lines of the Salvin designed Stc XVI–XIX with the tower of 1853, as does the 1968 building by Beard Stc XX, replacing a Victorian structure. This completely hides a formal gateway similar to that at the Broad Street main entrance, this can be viewed outside from Little Magdalen Street, through the gap marked XIX is the small function room "Massey Room". At the north side of Stc XX is the "Back Gate" which is part of the 1906 Warren building, west and north side, Stc XXI. 1 St Giles' is its neighbour which is part of the college and houses the Oxford Internet Institute. Beard's Stc XXII replaces Victorian rooms, which were provided from the Vivian Bulkeley-Johnson benefaction. Beard's Stc XX and XXII are connected by the Snell Bridge accommodation at third-floor level, which was provided from Glasgow University's Snell Benefaction.

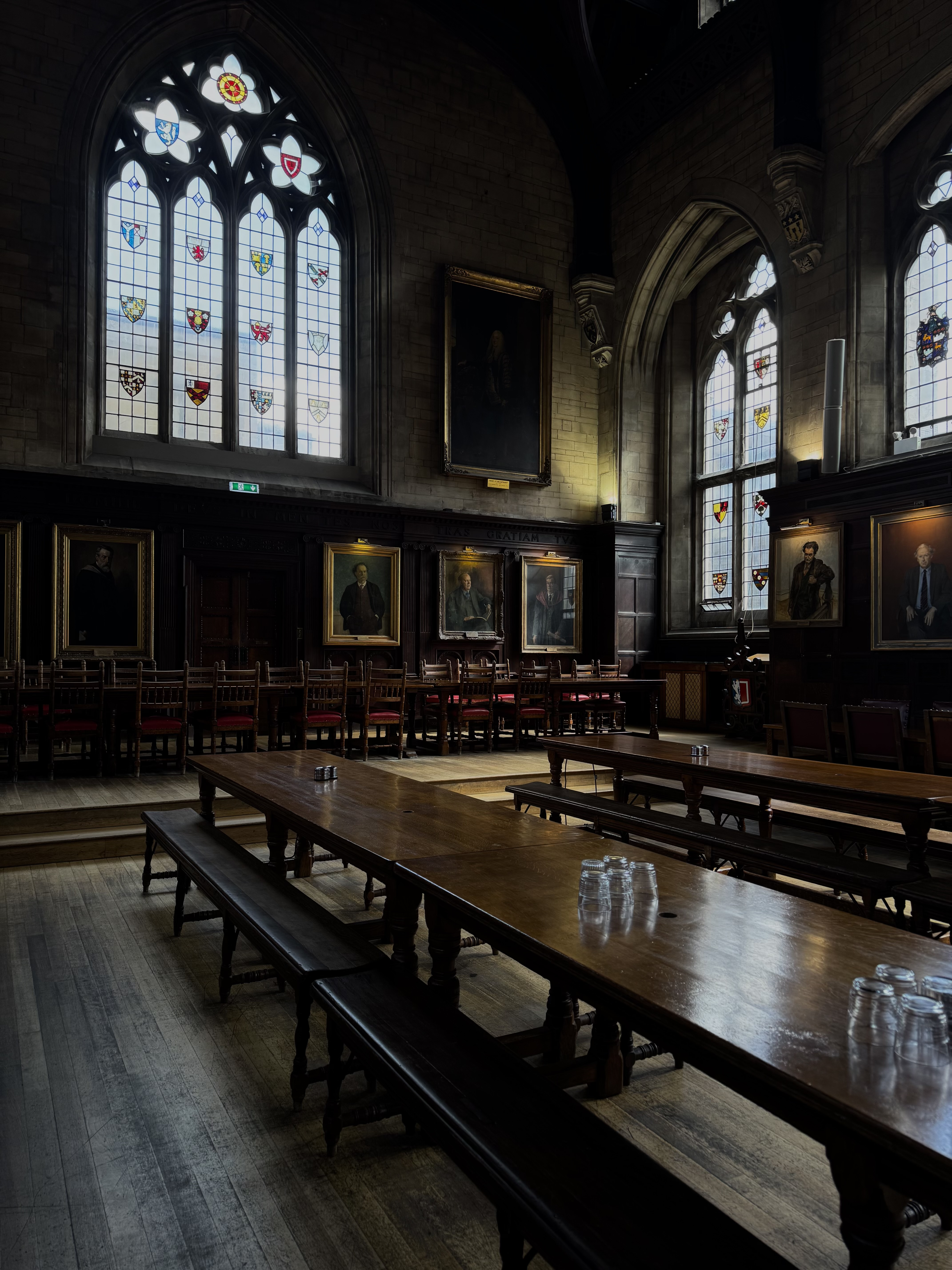
Dining Hall of Balliol College

The college's dining hall was built in 1877, replacing an older hall in the front quadrangle, which had become too small for the college's population. The land w for this was purchased by and donated to the college by its then Master, Benjamin Jowett. Designed by Alfred Waterhouse, the hall is built in geometric style, using Bath stone and Tisbury stone, with roof and woodwork made of oak. The hall features a Willis organ, also instituted by Jowett to allow the hall's use for secular music concerts. The old hall became part of the library.

The ground floor contains the college bar and shop, known as "The Buttery" (west side) and the Senior Common Room lunch room (east side). The 1966 new Senior Common Room range (Stc XXIII) (northern and eastern sides) was a benefaction of the Bernard Sunley Foundation and contains some smaller rooms and the principal SCR lounge, replacing Victorian facilities. Below this is a Lecture Room ("LR XXIII").

The east side of the quad is a neighbouring wall with Trinity College, at the southern end is the Master's Garden, in front of the chapel, and the Fellows' Garden in front of the "Old" (Senior) Common Room. The Tower forming the corner between the "Old Hall" and "Old Library" is also by Salvin, of 1853 and balances that at Stc XVI–XIX.

Underneath part of the Garden Quad and extending into Trinity were the Balliol-Trinity Laboratories, the most prominent Oxford physical and chemical laboratories in late nineteenth and early twentieth centuries, in which physical chemist Henry Moseley (originator of the atomic number) and Nobel Laureate Cyril Hinshelwood worked. These are now disused, following the construction of the university Physical and Theoretical Chemistry Laboratory on South Parks Road.

=== Holywell Manor, Manor Road and Jowett Walk ===
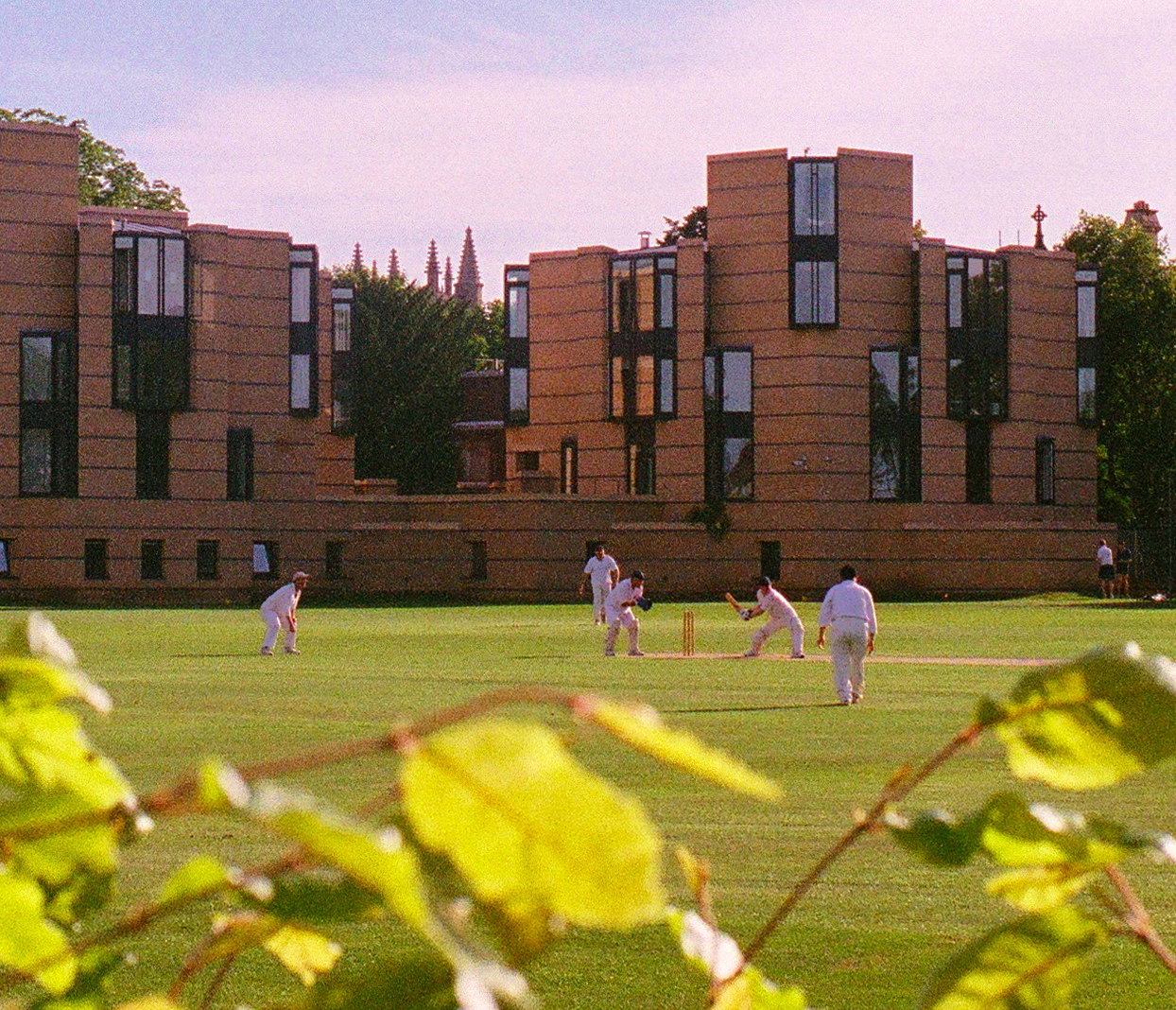
Cricket on the Master's Field with the Jowett Walk buildings in the background

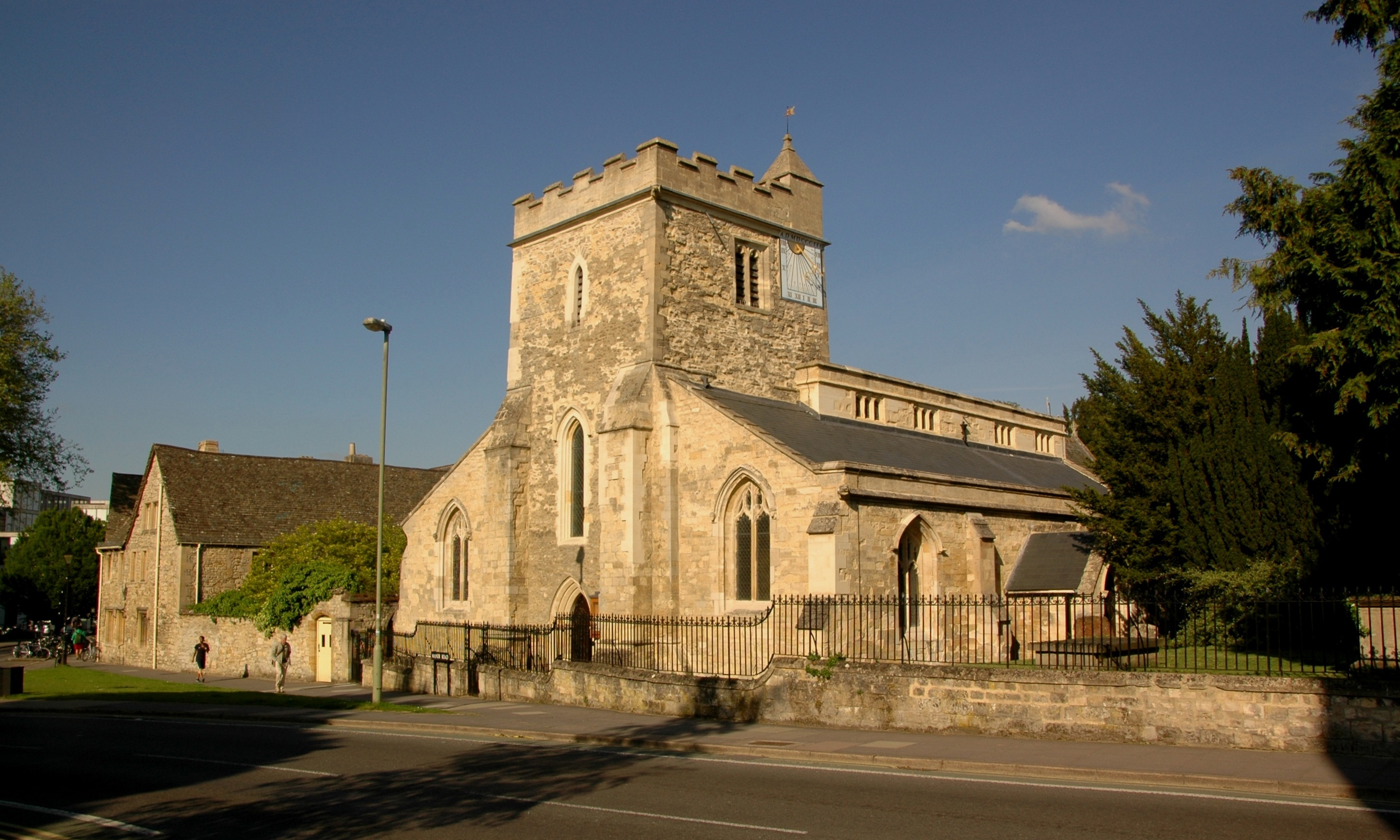
St Cross Church

The majority of research and post-graduate students are housed in the Holywell Manor complex, a Grade II listed building acquired by Balliol in 1932 under the direction of Kenneth Norman Bell. It hosts a collection of artworks by alumni of the college, including a mural by Gilbert Spencer depicting the college's founding, and hosts a biennial Holywell Manor Festival, Garden Party, and Garden Play. Balliol hosts more graduate students than any other ancient college, and the Manor forms the centre of this community, providing facilities such as the Middle Common Room (MCR) itself, an extensive garden, TV and computer rooms, music practice rooms, a 'Cockpit' leisure room, and the graduate-student-run 'Megaron' bar. The Manor from 1967 until the full admission of women at Balliol in 1979 was host to the Balliol-St Anne's Graduate Institution, including students from St Anne's College, Oxford. Former residents include Bill Clinton and Masako, Empress of Japan.

The 20th century saw several further additions to the college's accommodation, the Martin Building of 1966 ('Holywell Minor, a reference to Holywell Manor, across the road) and the Dellal Building (1986) for graduates on Manor Road.

Many undergraduates and some graduates live in buildings on Jowett Walk a phased development 1996–2004 (Phase 1 completed September 1996, Phase 2 completed July 2004), containing a small theatre facility, the Michael Pilch Studio, five minutes' walking distance from the main college site; these two developments are on the outskirts of the Master's Field, the sports ground and pavilion facilities of the college. Jowett Walk has also provided accommodation for some non-Balliol undergraduates, as part of an arrangement with Wadham College, Oxford.

From 2010, St Cross Church, next to the Manor, has been the college's Historic Collections Centre, an extension to the library's services. The church dates from the 11th or 12th century and is a Grade I listed building. This is the third time an Oxford college has incorporated a redundant church as a Library (see Lincoln College and St. Edmund Hall).

In 2017, the college entered into a specialised financial arrangement which enabled it to project a new 200 plus 'study-bedsits' accommodation range at the Master's Field/ Jowett Walk/ St Cross Road site which would also replace the Eastman Professor's House, Martin and Dellal buildings there. This would mean a net increase of approximately 140 rooms fulfilling the college's long-term intention of providing accommodation to all its undergraduates for all their degree terms and also some rooms for dons.

The project includes ten new buildings and a new sports pavilion, including a space for dining, events, spectators and squash courts in the basement. The first building opened in spring 2019 and the completion and occupation of the rest is due by January 2021. In the first phase, work began on the south of the site, at the corner of Jowett Walk and St Cross Road, to provide the accommodation for undergraduates and the new pavilion.

== Oxford Internet Institute ==
Balliol College, and its previous Master Andrew Graham, played a major role in 2000–01 in setting up the Oxford Internet Institute. This was the first multidisciplinary research and policy centre in a European university devoted to examining the impact of the Internet on society. It is a department within the Social Sciences Division of Oxford University, but is physically located within the grounds of Balliol, and its previous Director (William H. Dutton) was a Professorial Fellow of Balliol.

== Student life ==
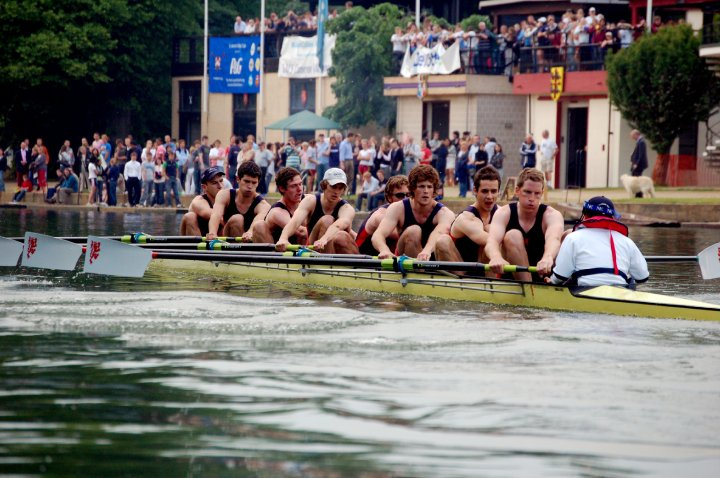
Balliol College rowing to Head of the River in Summer Eights 2008

=== Student profile ===
Each year the college matriculates approximately 260 undergraduates and postgraduates combined according to the most recent data which is from the three-year period 2021–2023. The same source gives the socio-demographic profile of the students is as follows: male 54.5%; state educated 69.6%; white 73.4%. The proportion of male students decreased from 60.6% between the years of 2015 and 2017.

=== Facilities ===
The college provides its students with facilities including accommodation, the Hall (refectory), a library, two bars, and separate common rooms for the fellows, the graduates and undergraduates. The JCR provides many services from laundry facilities, one of the few entirely student-run bars left in Oxford (the Manager, Lord/Lady Lindsay, is elected each year by students in the JCR) to a student-run cafeteria known as Pantry. There is a garden quadrangle and a nearby sports ground (the Master's Field) and boathouse. The sports ground is mainly used for cricket, tennis, hockey and football. Croquet may be played in the Master's Field or, in the summer term, in the garden quadrangle.

The majority of undergraduates are housed within the main college or in the modern annexes (Jowett Walk buildings) around the sports ground. The graduates are housed mainly within Holywell Manor which has its own bar, gardens, common room, gym and computing facilities.

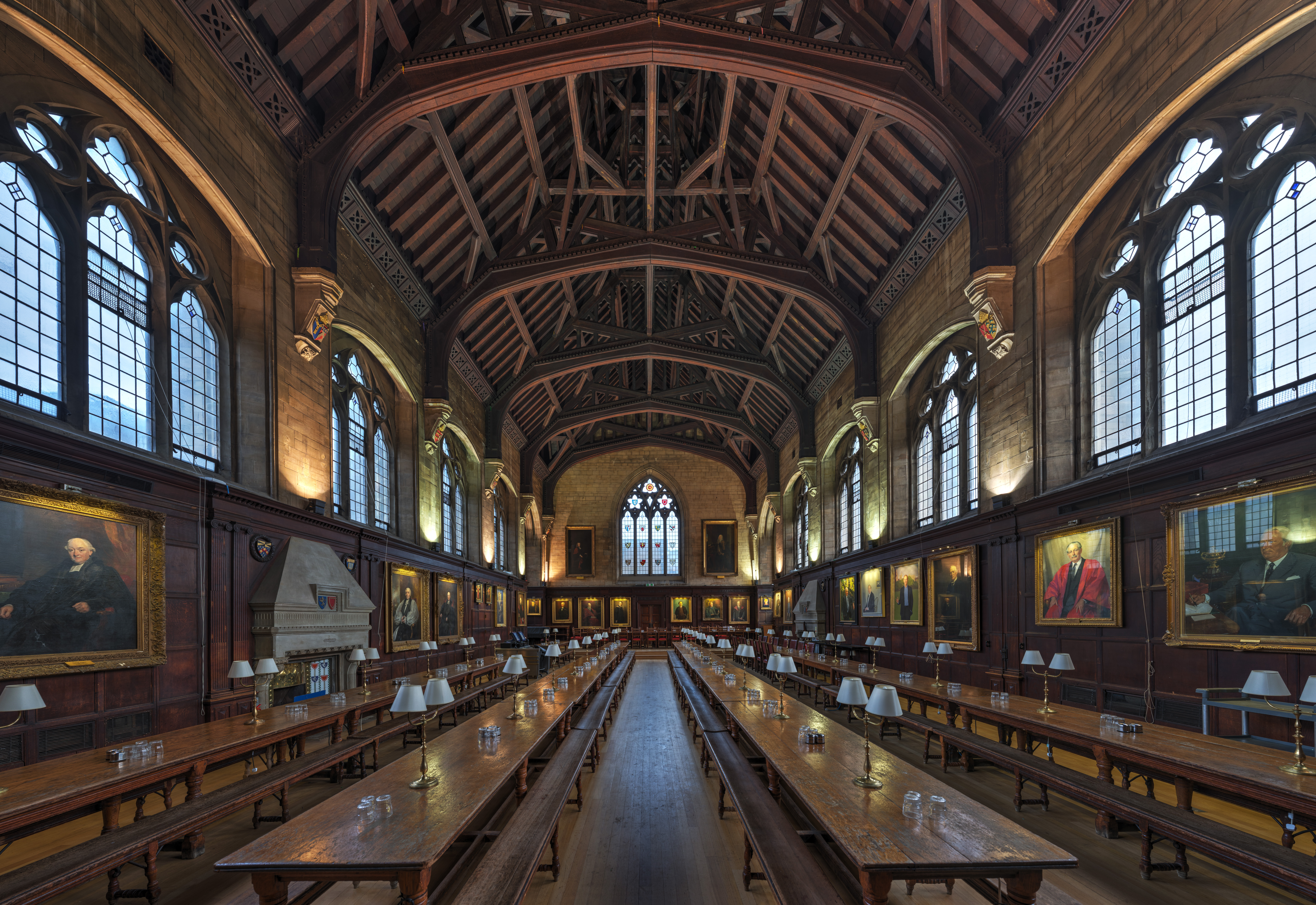
Balliol College Dining Hall

== Traditions and customs ==
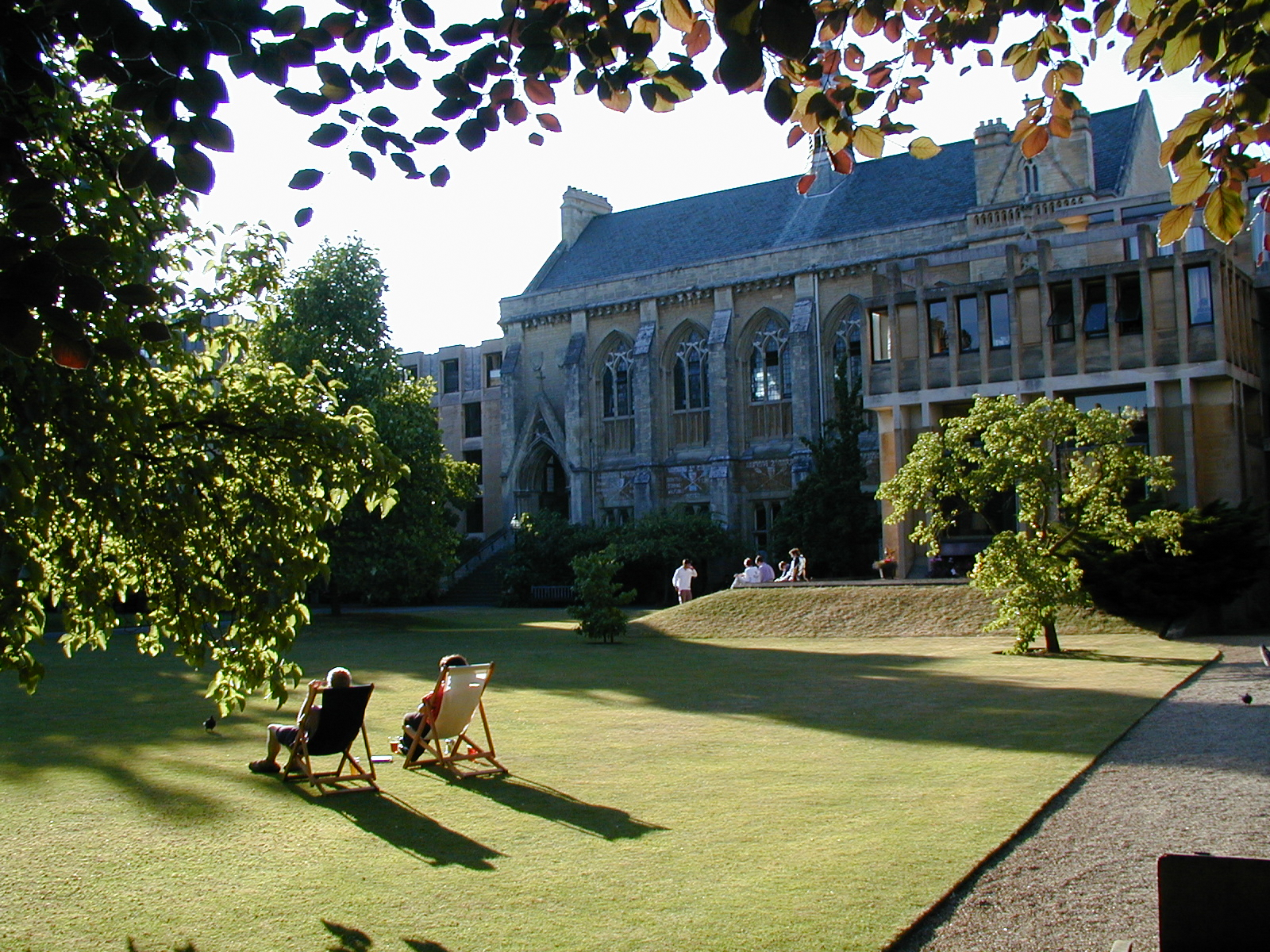
Garden Quad

Along with many of the ancient colleges, Balliol has evolved its own traditions and customs over the centuries, many of which occupy a regular calendar slot.

The patron saint of the college is Saint Catherine of Alexandria. On her feast day (25 November), a formal dinner is held for all final year students within Balliol. This festival was well established by 1550. Another important feast is the Snell Dinner. This dinner is held in memory of John Snell, whose benefaction established exhibitions for students from the University of Glasgow to study at Balliol (the first exhibitioners were matriculated in 1699) one of whom was Adam Smith. The feast is attended by fellows of Balliol College, the current Snell Exhibitioners, and representatives from Glasgow University and St John's College, Cambridge.

The MCR has one black-tie dinner each term: the Christmas Dinner in Michaelmas, Burns Night in Hilary, and the May Dinner in Trinity Term.

By far the most eccentric event is The Nepotists carol-singing event organised by the college's Arnold and Brackenbury Society. This event happens on the last Friday of Michaelmas term each year. On this occasion, Balliol students congregate in the college hall to enjoy mulled wine and the singing of carols. The evening historically ended with a rendition of "The Gordouli" (see Balliol–Trinity rivalry below) on Broad Street, outside the gates of Trinity College, although in recent years the song has been sung from within the college walls.

A college society which no longer survives is the Hysteron Proteron Club, which aimed to live one day of each term backwards.

=== Tortoises ===
Balliol also takes pride in its college tortoises. The original tortoise, who lived at the college for at least 43 years, was known as Rosa, named after the Marxist Rosa Luxemburg. Each June, pet tortoises from various Oxford colleges are brought to Corpus Christi College where they participate in a very slow race; Balliol's own Rosa competed and won many times. Rosa disappeared in the Spring of 2004, and while numerous conspiracy theories abounded, none is officially recognised by the college. However, on 29 April 2007, Chris Skidmore, a graduate of Christ Church working at the House of Commons, donated a pair of tortoises - one to his own college, and one to Balliol, where he had attended an open day in 1999. The new tortoise, Matilda, died in April 2009. Taking care of the resident tortoise is one of the many tasks assigned to Balliol students each year. This position, known as "Comrade Tortoise", has been filled by a first year student.

=== Balliol–Trinity rivalry ===
For many years, there has been a traditional and fierce rivalry shown between the students of Balliol and those of its immediate neighbour to the east, Trinity College. It has manifested itself on the sports field and the river; in the form of songs (of varying degrees of offensiveness) sung over the dividing walls; and in the form of "raids" on the other college. The rivalry reflects that which also exists between Trinity College, Cambridge and Balliol's sister college, St John's College, Cambridge.

In college folklore, the rivalry goes back to the late 17th century, when Ralph Bathurst, President of Trinity, was supposedly observed throwing stones at Balliol's windows. In fact, in its modern form, the rivalry appears to date from the late 1890s, when the chant or song known as a "Gordouli" began to be sung from the Balliol side.

The traditional words run:

Gordouli
Face like a ham,
Bobby Johnson says so
And he should know.

The shouting of chants over the wall is still known as "a Gordouli", and the tradition continues as the students gather to sing following boat club dinners and other events. The traditional Gordouli is said to have been sung by Balliol and Trinity men in the trenches of Mesopotamia in the First World War.

Balliol became known for its radicalism and political activism in the 20th century, and saw an abortive coup in the 1960s in which students took over the college and declared it "the People's Republic of Balliol". The contrast between the radical tendencies of many Balliol students and the traditional conservatism and social exclusivity of Trinity gave the rivalry an extra edge. The fact that Balliol (in contrast to Trinity) had admitted a number of Indian and Asiatic students also gave many of the taunts from the Trinity side a distinctly racist tone: Balliol students, for example, were sometime referred to as "Basutos".

In Five Red Herrings (1931), a Lord Peter Wimsey novel by Somerville alumna Dorothy L. Sayers, Lord Peter (a Balliol man) is asked whether he remembers a certain contemporary from Trinity. "'I never knew any Trinity men,' said Wimsey. 'The Jews have no dealings with the Samaritans.'" Sayers also alludes to the rivalry in Murder Must Advertise (1933): Mr Ingleby, a Trinity man, comments, "If there is one thing more repulsive than another it is Balliolity."

One of the wittier raids from Balliol, in 1962 or 1963, involved the turfing of the whole of Trinity JCR (complete with daffodils). The last incident suspected to relate to the feud was the vandalism of Trinity's Senior Common Room pond, which led to the death of all but one of the fish.

== Literary repartee ==
=== Materialistic limerick ===
The Garden Quad at Balliol is the scene of the well-known limerick that parodies the immaterialist philosophy of Bishop Berkeley:

There was a young man who said, God
Must think it exceedingly odd
If he finds that this tree
Still continues to be
When there's no one about in the Quad.

and also of the response, by the Balliol-educated Catholic theologian and Bible translator Ronald Knox, which more accurately reflects Berkeley's own beliefs:

Dear Sir, your astonishment's odd:
I am always about in the Quad.
And that's why the tree
Will continue to be,
Since observed by, Yours faithfully, GOD.

=== The Masque of Balliol ===
In 1880, seven mischievous Balliol undergraduates published The Masque of B-ll--l, a broadsheet of forty quatrains making light of their superiors – the master and selected fellows, scholars, and commoners – and themselves. The outraged authorities immediately suppressed the collection, and only a few copies survived, three of which found their way into the college library over the years, and one into the Bodleian Library. Verses of this form are now known as Balliol rhymes.

The best known of these rhymes is the one on Benjamin Jowett. This has been widely quoted and reprinted in virtually every book about Jowett and about Balliol ever since.

First come I.
My name is J-W-TT.
There's no knowledge but I know it.
I am Master of this College,
What I don't know isn't knowledge.

This and 18 others are attributed to Henry Charles Beeching. The other quatrains are much less well known.

William Tuckwell included 18 of these quatrains in his Reminiscences in 1900, but they all came out only in 1939, thanks to Walter George Hiscock, an Oxford librarian, who issued them personally then and in a second edition in 1955.

== People associated with Balliol ==
=== Notable people ===
A wide range of figures who have contributed deeply to public life were either educated or taught at Balliol. Balliol people were, for example, prominent in establishing the International Baccalaureate, the National Trust, the Workers Educational Association, the welfare state, the Campaign for Nuclear Disarmament and Amnesty International.

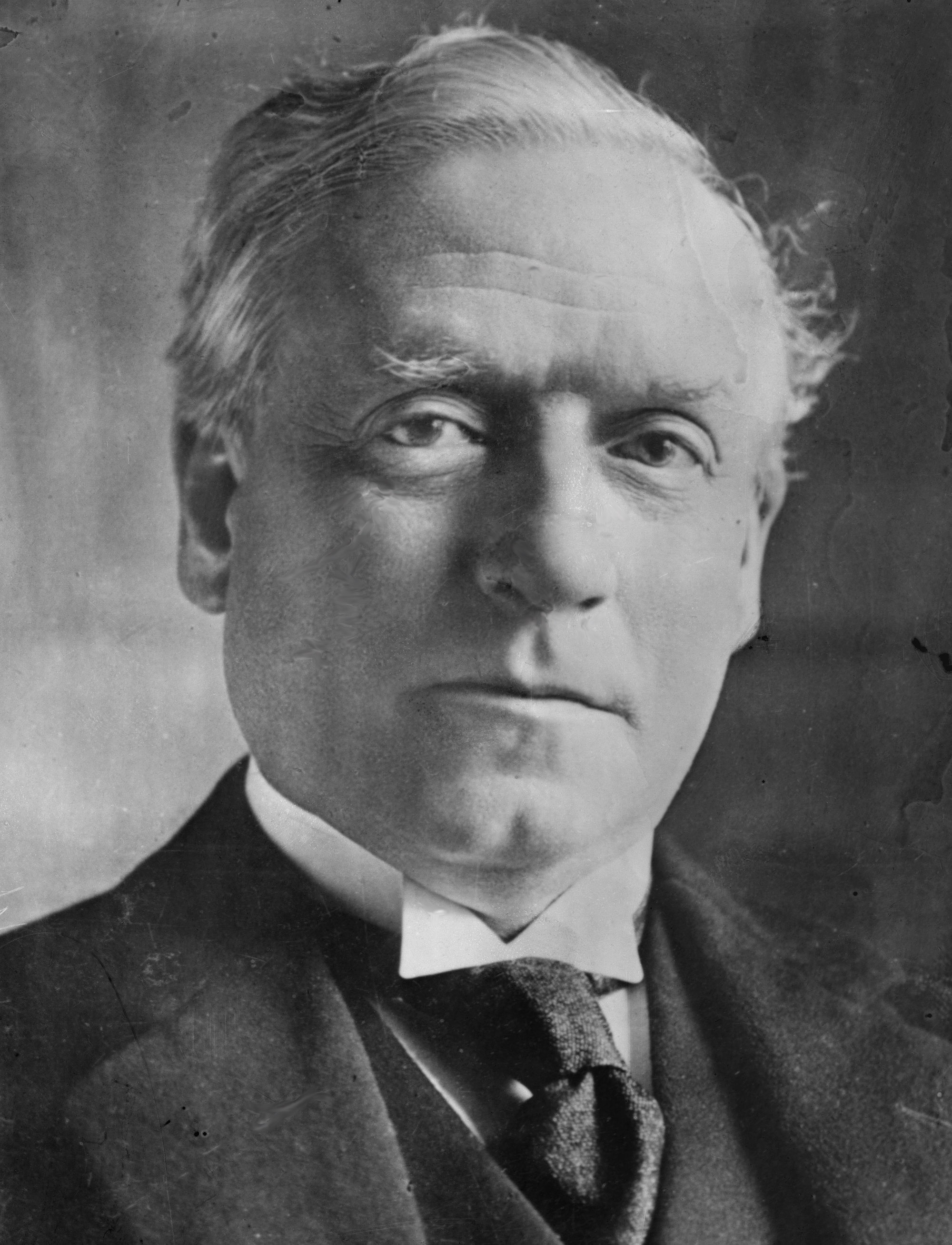
H. H. Asquith, Prime Minister of the United Kingdom

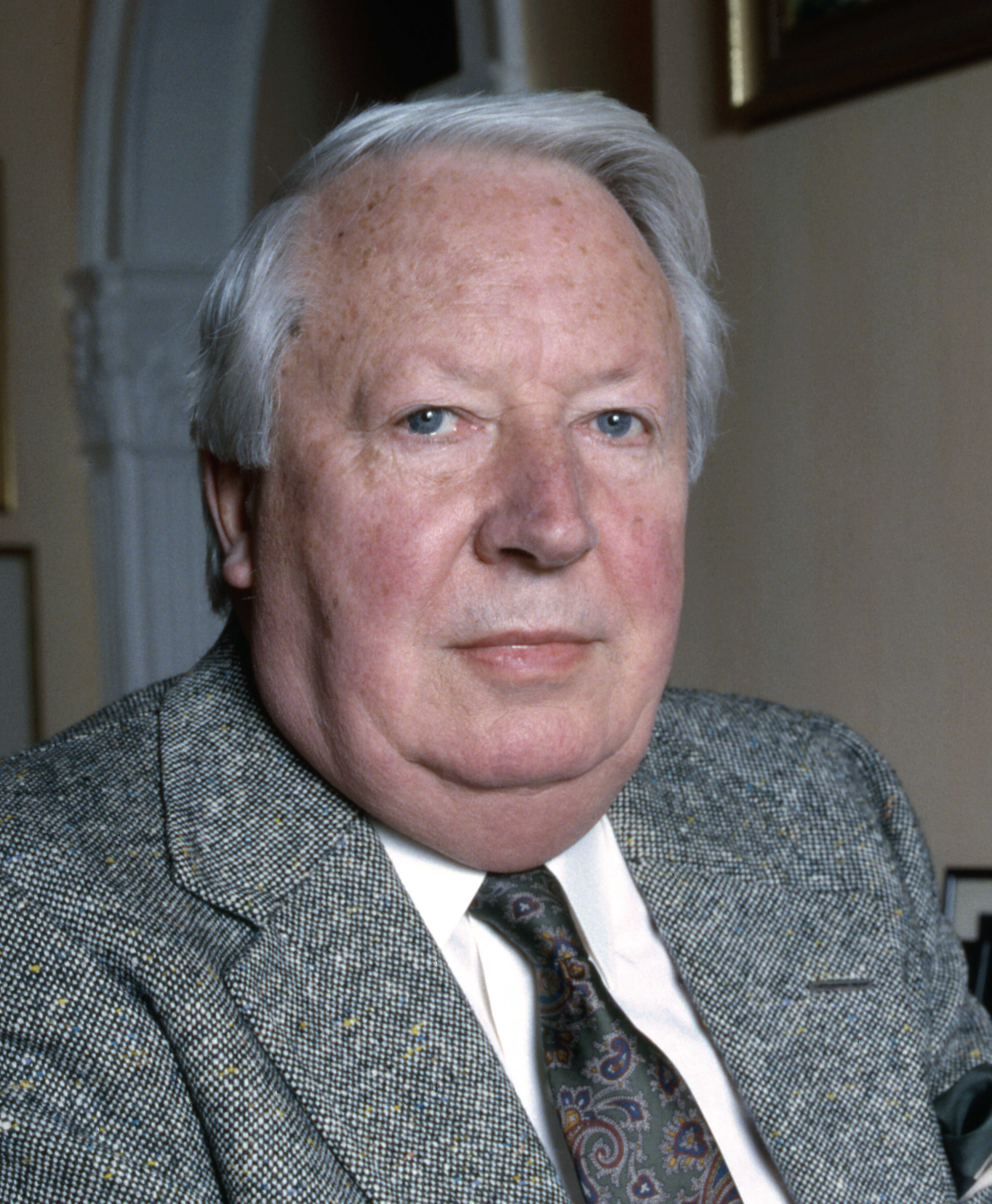
Edward Heath, Prime Minister of the United Kingdom

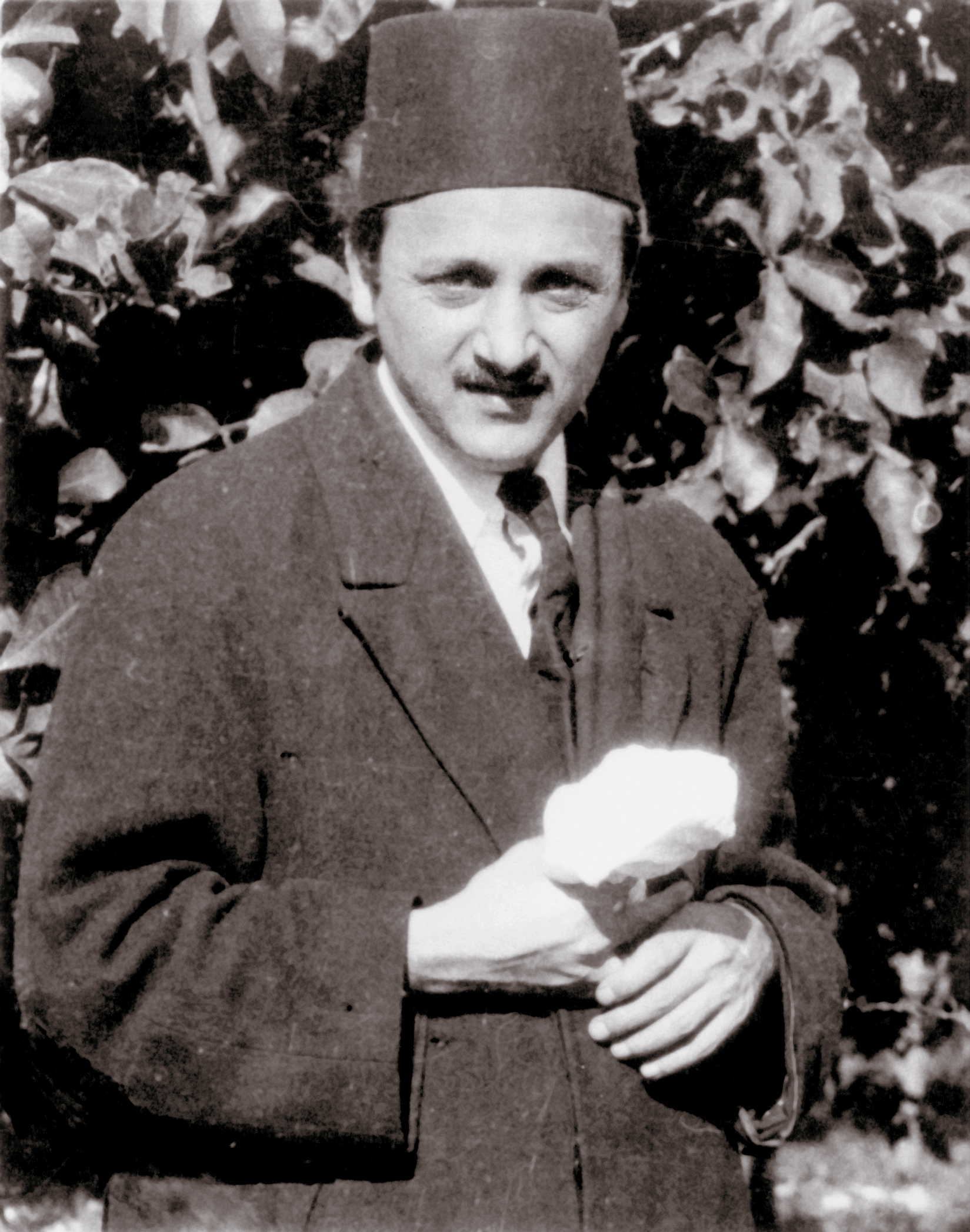
Shoghi Effendi, Guardian of the Baháʼí Faith

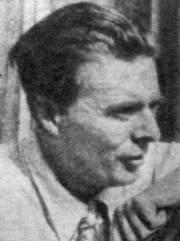
Aldous Huxley, writer and philosopher

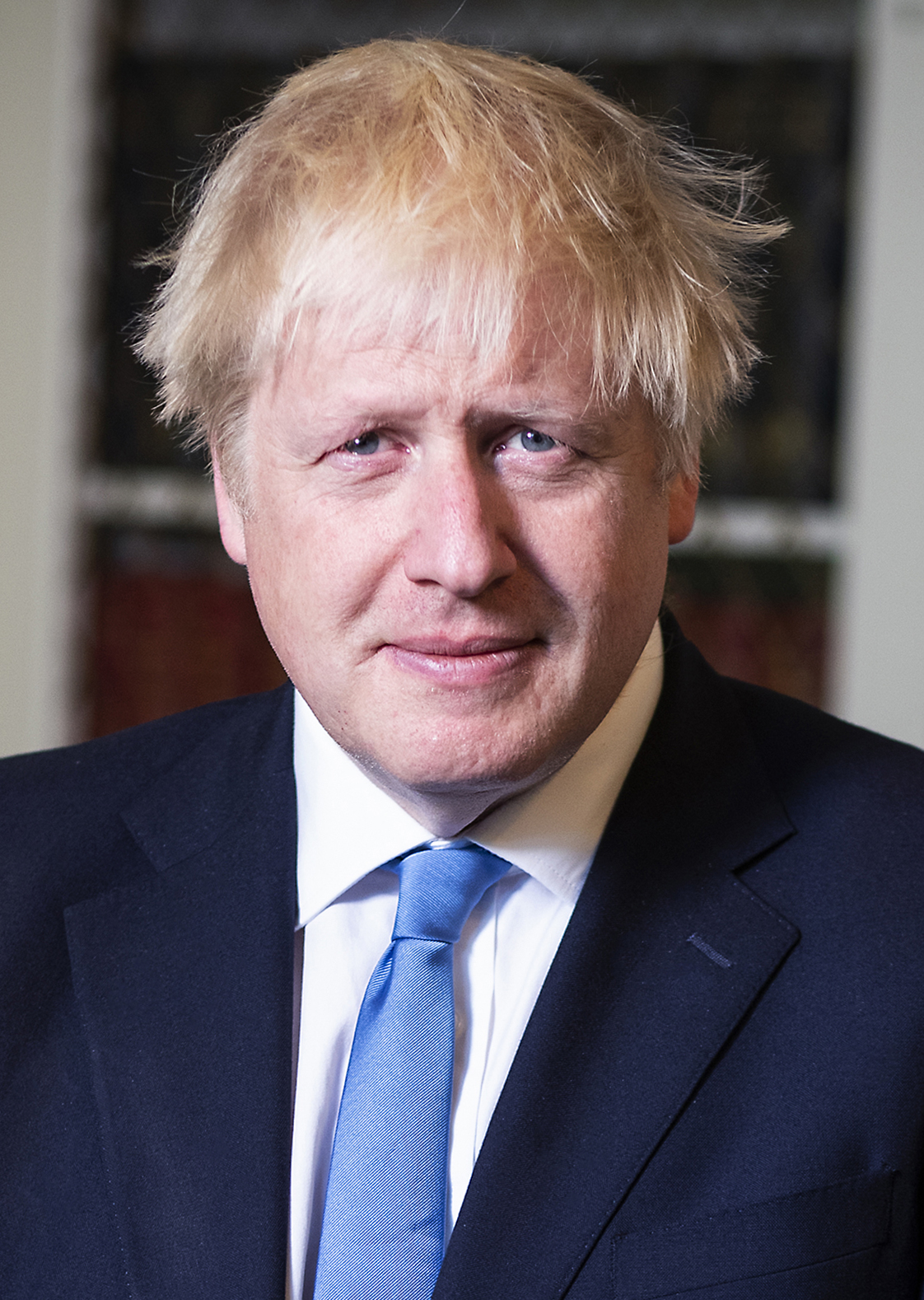
Boris Johnson, Prime Minister of the United Kingdom

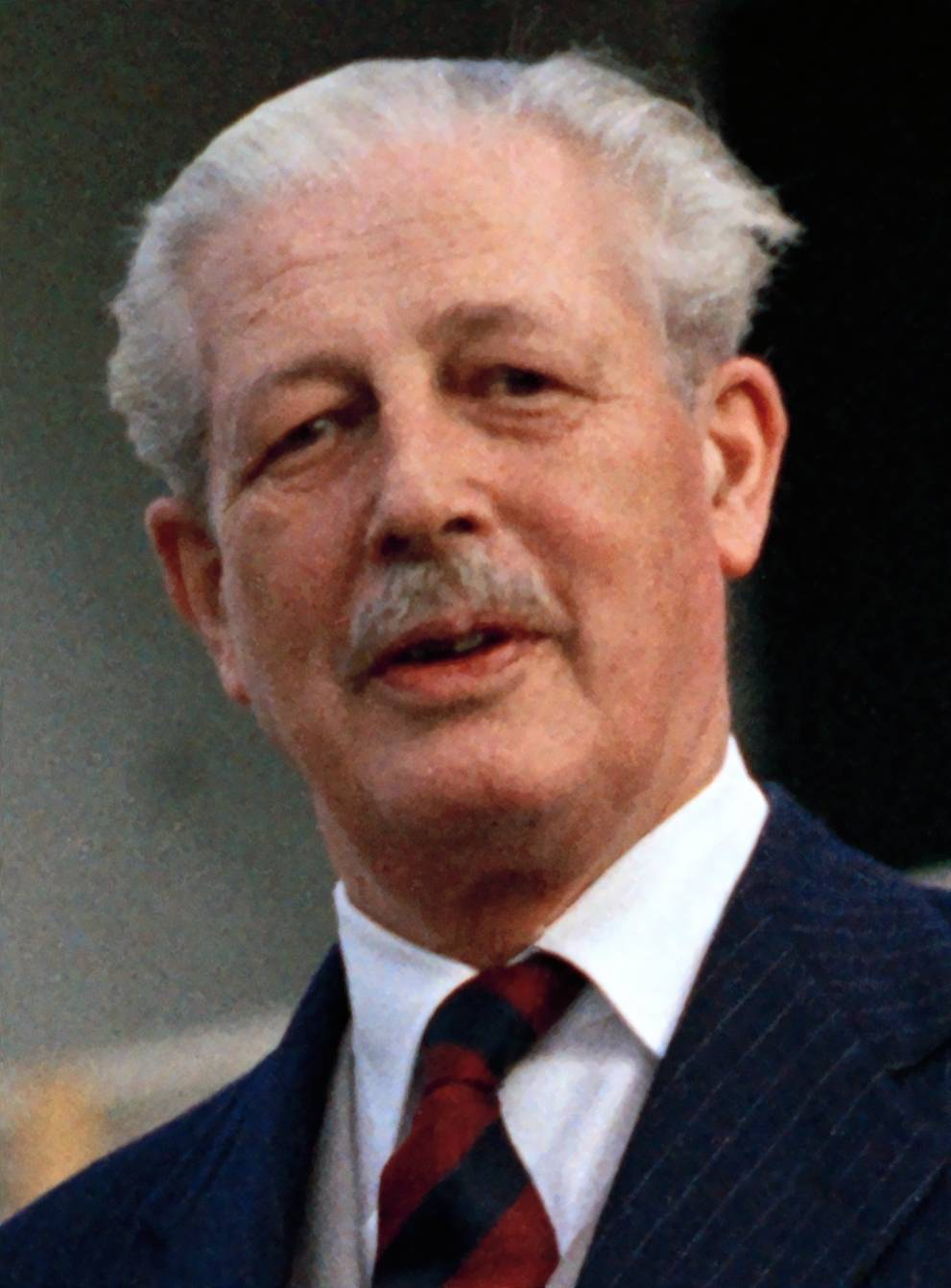
Harold Macmillan, Prime Minister of the United Kingdom

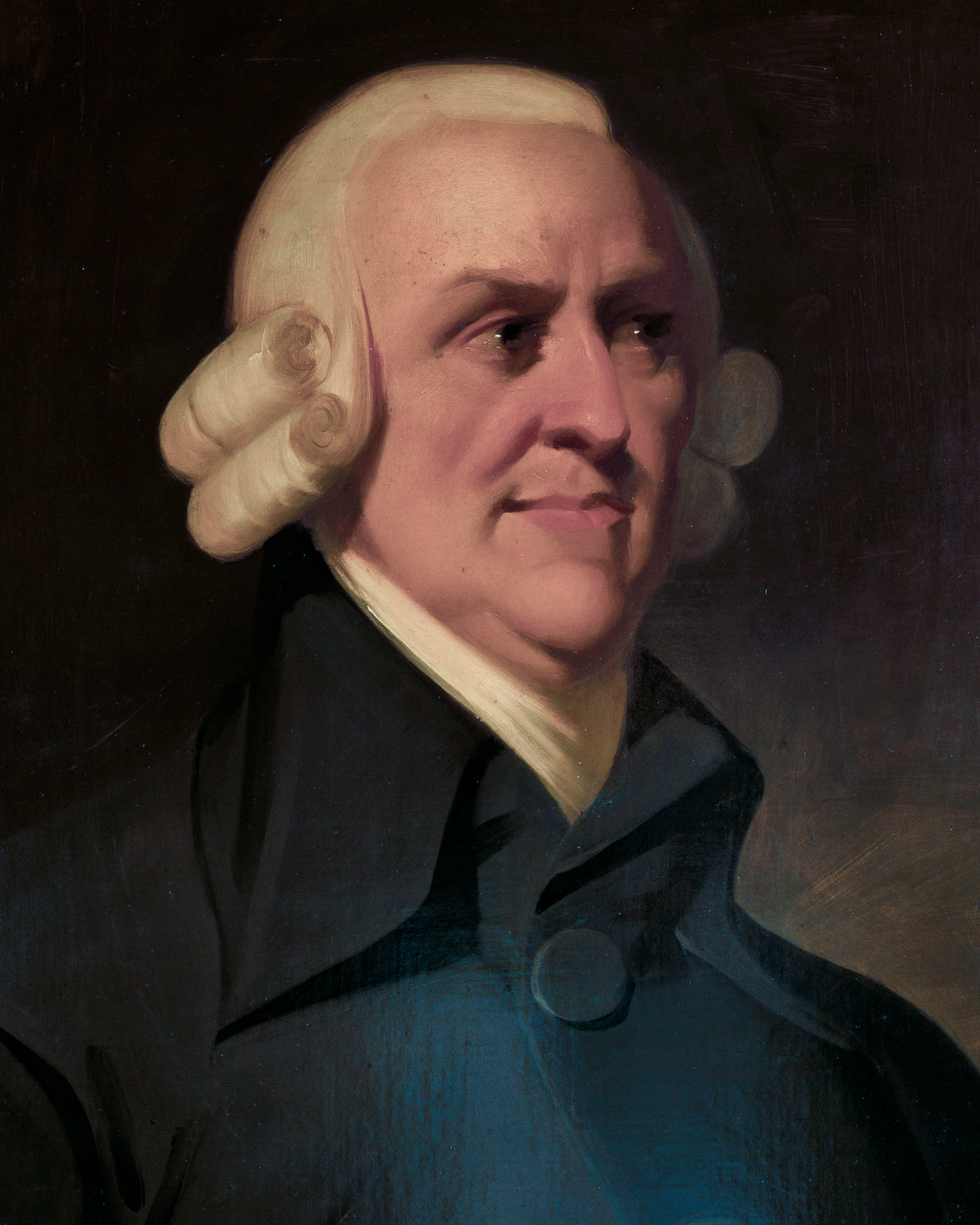
Adam Smith, economist and author

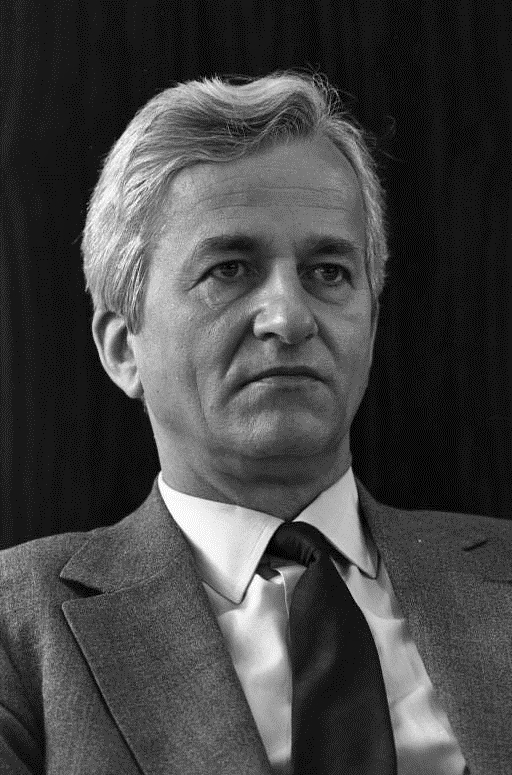
Richard von Weizsäcker, former President of Germany

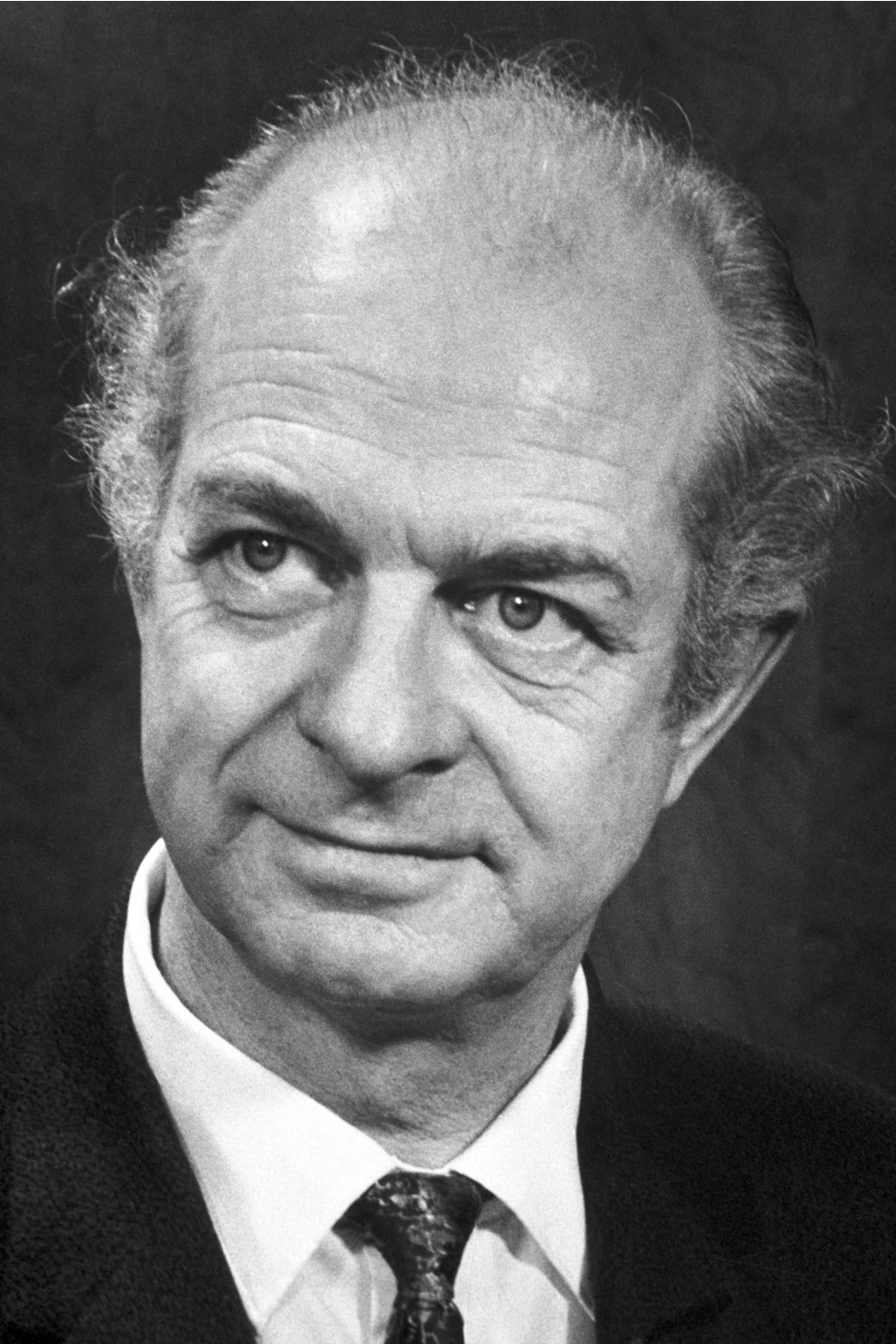
Linus Pauling, American chemist who was awarded two unshared Nobel Prizes

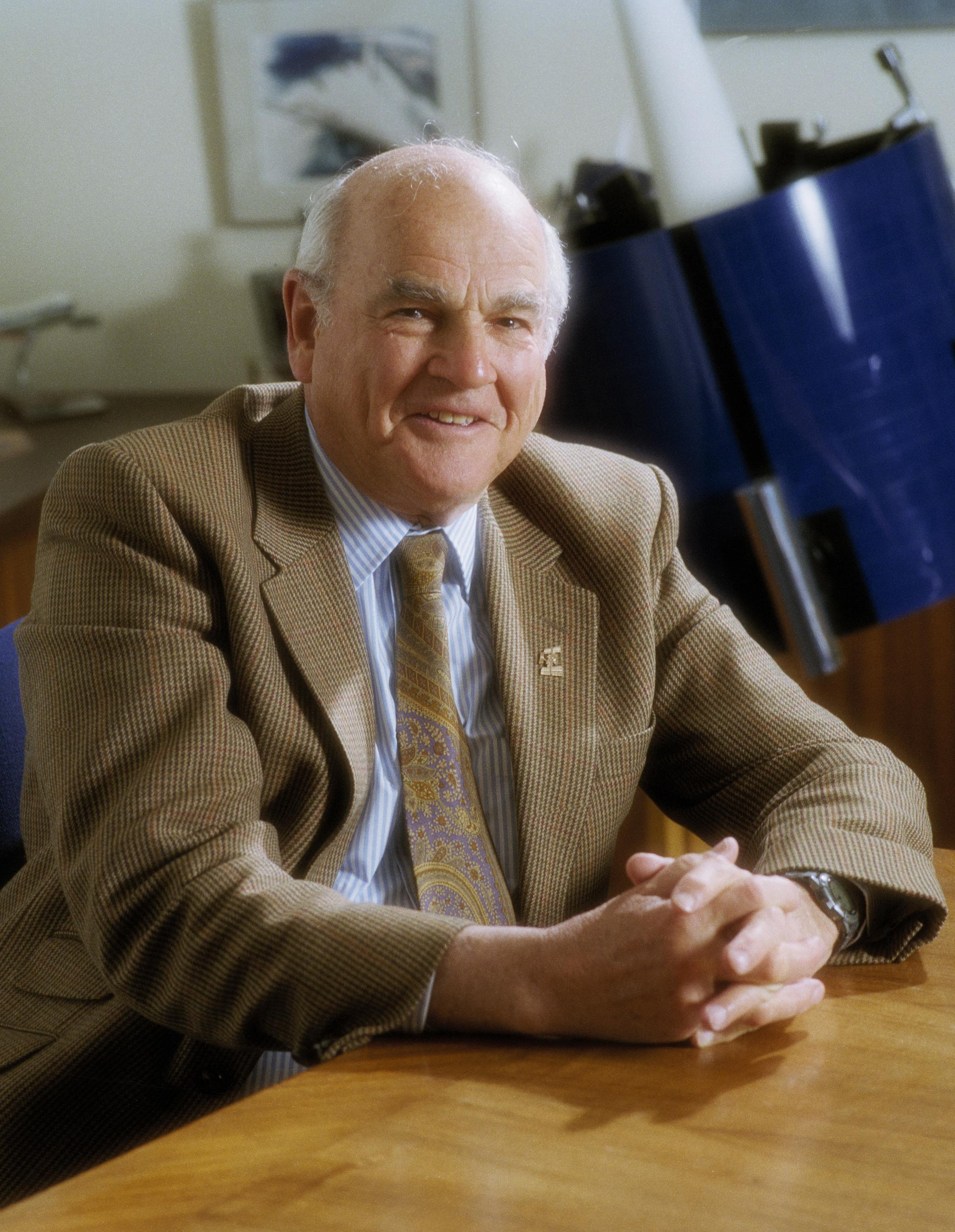
Barry Blumberg, American physician who was awarded the Nobel Prize in Physiology or Medicine

Nobel Prize winners

Five former Balliol students and seven fellows became Nobel Laureates, with Linus Pauling winning two Nobel Prizes.

Name	Field	Year
Linus Pauling	Chemistry	1954
Cyril Norman Hinshelwood	Chemistry	1956
George Beadle	Physiology or Medicine	1958
Linus Pauling	Peace	1962
John Hicks	Economics	1972
Gunnar Myrdal	Economics	1974
Baruch S. Blumberg	Physiology or Medicine	1976
John Van Vleck	Physics	1977
Robert Solow	Economics	1987
Norman Ramsey	Physics	1989
William D. Phillips	Physics	1997
Anthony J. Leggett	Physics	2003
Oliver Smithies	Physiology or Medicine	2007

Science

Balliol played an important role in early modern science:

- The early Newtonian David Gregory was "the first to openly teach the doctrines of the Principia, in a public seminary" and was elected Savilian Professor of Astronomy, due in large part to the influence of Isaac Newton
- John Keill, another important defender of Newton, who after being appointed as lecturer in experimental philosophy at Hart Hall, started performing experiments based on Newton's findings
- The mathematician James Stirling, best remembered for Stirling's approximation for factorials, was a Snell and Warner exhibitioner expelled in 1715 for his correspondence with Jacobites
- James Bradley, best known for his discovery of the aberration of light and the nutation of the Earth's axis, who was placed (after Hipparchus and Kepler) "above the greatest astronomers of all ages and all countries" by Delambre and was appointed Savilian Professor of Astronomy, eventually becoming the third Astronomer Royal in 1742
- Alex Jadad, creator of the Jadad scale, the most widely used tool to assess the quality of clinical trials in the world, and convener of the global conversation that resulted in the re-conceptualization of health as 'the ability to adapt and manage' the physical, mental or social challenges faced by individuals or communities throughout life.

Evolutionary biologist Richard Dawkins was a Balliol student from 1959 to 1962.

Politics

Balliol has produced four British prime ministers; H. H. Asquith, Harold Macmillan, Edward Heath and Boris Johnson.

Current prominent alumni in UK politics include; Yvette Cooper, Foreign Secretary and former Home Secretary; Matthew Pennycook, Minister of State for Housing and Planning; Jo Johnson, life peer and former Minister of State for Universities, Science, Research and Innovation; and Simon Stevens, former Chief Executive of NHS England.

International leaders include; Richard von Weizsäcker, President of Germany from 1984 to 1994, oversaw the reunification of Germany; Sir Seretse Khama, the first President of Botswana who led his country's independence movement and transition from British rule into an independent democratic nation; Abdullah Bishara, first secretary general of the Gulf Cooperation Council (1981–1993) who played a vital role during the first Gulf War, former Kuwait representative to the United Nations (1971–1981) and Vincent Massey, governor general of Canada from 1952 to 1959.

Royal alumni include; Empress Masako of Japan, Ja'afar of Negeri Sembilan of Malaysia, Olav V of Norway and his son Harald V of Norway.

Political journalists:

- Financial Times associate editor Stephen Bush
- The Guardian's chief arts writer Charlotte Higgins
- Columnist and Labour communications specialist Seumas Milne
- The Times columnist David Aaronovitch
- Christopher Hitchens

Law

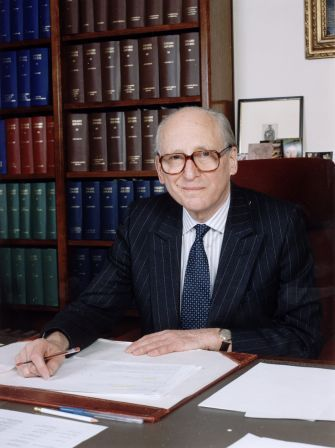
Lord Bingham, Senior Law Lord who advocated for the formation of the United Kingdom Supreme Court

- John Marshall Harlan II, described as one of the most influential US Supreme Court justices of the twentieth century, he was elected a fellow of the American Academy of Arts and Sciences in 1960
- Thomas Bingham, a British judge who was successively Master of the Rolls, Lord Chief Justice and Senior Law Lord
- Brian Hutton and Alan Rodger held equivalent positions in Northern Ireland and Scotland, at one point, all three simultaneously
- Cressida Dick, former commissioner of the London Metropolitan Police, the first woman to hold this role

Literature

- Robert Southey, Poet Laureate chiefly remembered today for the original version of "Goldilocks and the Three Bears"

The height of Baliol's literary influence came in the Victorian era, when virtually all major poets had some connection with Balliol:

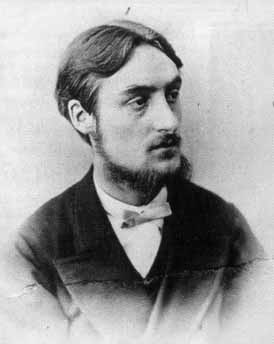
Gerard Manley Hopkins, considered as influential as T. S. Eliot in initiating literary modernism

- Gerard Manley Hopkins, though publishing little while alive, has experienced posthumous fame that placed him among leading English poets with his prosody establishing him as an innovator, as did his praise of God through vivid use of imagery and nature; by 1930 Hopkins's work was seen as one of the most original literary advances of his century
- Matthew Arnold, influential poet and critic
- A. C. Swinburne, who was nominated for the Nobel Prize in Literature every year from 1903 to 1909
- Robert Browning, deemed "the most considerable poet in English since the major Romantics", was a personal friend of master Benjamin Jowett and became the college's first honorary fellow, donating his portrait and other memorabilia to the college, which grew to become "one of the most distinguished collections of Browning material"

Of 20th-century writers:

- Ronald Knox, Catholic priest, crime writer and translator of the Knox Bible
- Graham Greene, regarded as one of the leading novelists of the 20th century, shortlisted for the Nobel Prize in Literature several times
- Joseph Macleod, one of the earliest interpreters of Anton Chekhov in the UK
- Anthony Powell, associate of George Orwell who wrote A Dance to the Music of Time
- Robertson Davies, Canadian author and distinguished "man of letters"
- Nevil Shute, novelist, wrote A Town Like Alice, Trustee from the Toolroom and On the Beach
- Aldous Huxley, author of Brave New World and The Doors of Perception, nominated for the Nobel Prize in Literature nine times
- Hilaire Belloc, Franco-English writer

Among contemporary writers:

- Gwyneth Lewis (born 1959) is a Welsh poet who was the inaugural National Poet of Wales in 2005
- John Minford, sinologist known for his translation of Chinese classics like The Art of War, the I Ching and the Tao Te Ching

In terms of critics, Balliol has produced A. C. Bradley, writer of Shakespearean Tragedy, described as probably the most influential single work of Shakespearean criticism ever published, the "polyglot and polymath" George Steiner, and Christopher Ricks who has been acclaimed as the "greatest living critic"

Philosophy

Notable Balliol philosophers include:

- Adam Smith, a key figure of the Scottish Enlightenment, regarded as "The Father of Economics" or "The Father of Capitalism"
- T. H. Green, whose teaching is considered the most potent philosophical influence in England during the last quarter of the 19th century

Like most philosophy faculties in the Anglosphere, contemporary thought at Balliol is firmly grounded in the so-called analytic tradition:

- J. L. Austin, a leading proponent of ordinary language philosophy
- Charles Taylor, the first president of the Oxford Campaign for Nuclear Disarmament
- Bernard Williams, moral theorist described as an "analytical philosopher with the soul of a general humanist"
- Derek Parfit, moral philosopher whose first book, Reasons and Persons has been described as the most significant work of moral philosophy since the 1800s
- Jonathan Barnes, Professor of Ancient Philosophy at Oxford (1989–1994), who revised the Oxford Aristotle, universally recognized as the standard English version, in light of modern scholarship

Other notable contemporary philosophers include J. R. Lucas, R. M. Hare, Michael Sandel, Joseph Raz, Peter Geach, Michael Otsuka, Michael E. Rosen, and Timothy Williamson.

Sport

Balliol has also contributed to the sporting world; Iftikhar Ali Khan Pataudi and his son Mansoor Ali Khan Pataudi, both India cricket captains and the 8th and 9th Nawabs of Pataudi respectively, were both Balliol graduates who played for the university. US Olympian rower Caryn Davies received her MBA at Balliol.

History

- Rodney Hilton, Marxist historian of the late medieval period and the transition from feudalism to capitalism. Read Modern History (1935–38).

Other

- Shoghi Effendi, head of the Bahá'í Faith from 1921 until his death in 1957, studied economics and social sciences
- Andrew Copson, chief executive of Humanists UK and president of the International Humanist and Ethical Union.
- Howard Marks, a convicted drug dealer and later author, attended Balliol between 1964 and 1967 to study physics and then again between 1968 and 1969 to study History and Philosophy of Science.
- Ghislaine Maxwell, the British socialite who was convicted of sex trafficking of children for Jeffrey Epstein in 2021, graduated from Balliol in 1985.
- The first transgender hereditary peer, Matilda Simon, 3rd Baroness Simon of Wythenshawe, graduated from Balliol with a bachelor's degree and a doctor of philosophy.
- The first person documented to brew coffee in England, Nathaniel Canopius, was a Cretan student at Balliol from 1637 to 1648.
- In 2024, Karma Phuntsho, who finished his Doctor of Philosophy degree in 2003, became the first Bhutanese to receive the Ramon Magsaysay Award which is widely acclaimed as Asia's Nobel Prize.
- Tim Hilton, art critic and Guardian journalist whose books include The Pre-Raphaelites and a two-volume biography of John Ruskin.

Chancellors of the University of Oxford

Balliol members have predominated as holders of the office of chancellor of the university from the 20th century to the present;

- George Nathaniel Curzon
- Harold Macmillan
- Roy Jenkins
- Chris Patten

The last two being opposed in their election by Edward Heath and Lord Bingham of Cornhill respectively. Members of the college have been elected to masterships not only at Balliol but also at other colleges and include the former master of Christ's College, Cambridge, Jane Stapleton, a former fellow of Balliol.

=== Philanthropists ===
- Stephanie Shirley (2001), funded the Oxford Internet Institute which is based at Balliol.
- Matthew Westerman (1983), funded the Pathfinder scheme and extended it to Asia
- John Templeton (1934), Rhodes Scholar, fund manager
- J. Irwin Miller, American industrialist, modern architecture
- Cecil Jackson-Cole (1928 external student), founder of OXFAM
- William Appleton Coolidge (1924), set up a Pathfinder scheme for students to visit US
- Ralph Radcliffe Whitehead (1874), arts and crafts movement
- Hannah Brackenbury (1865), major donor to Balliol College for scholarships and buildings
- Dervorguilla of Galloway (1282), endowed Balliol College as a "college for the poor"

== See also ==
- Music at Balliol College, Oxford
