= South Parks Road =

Road in Oxford, England

Coordinates: 51.75791°N 1.25494°W

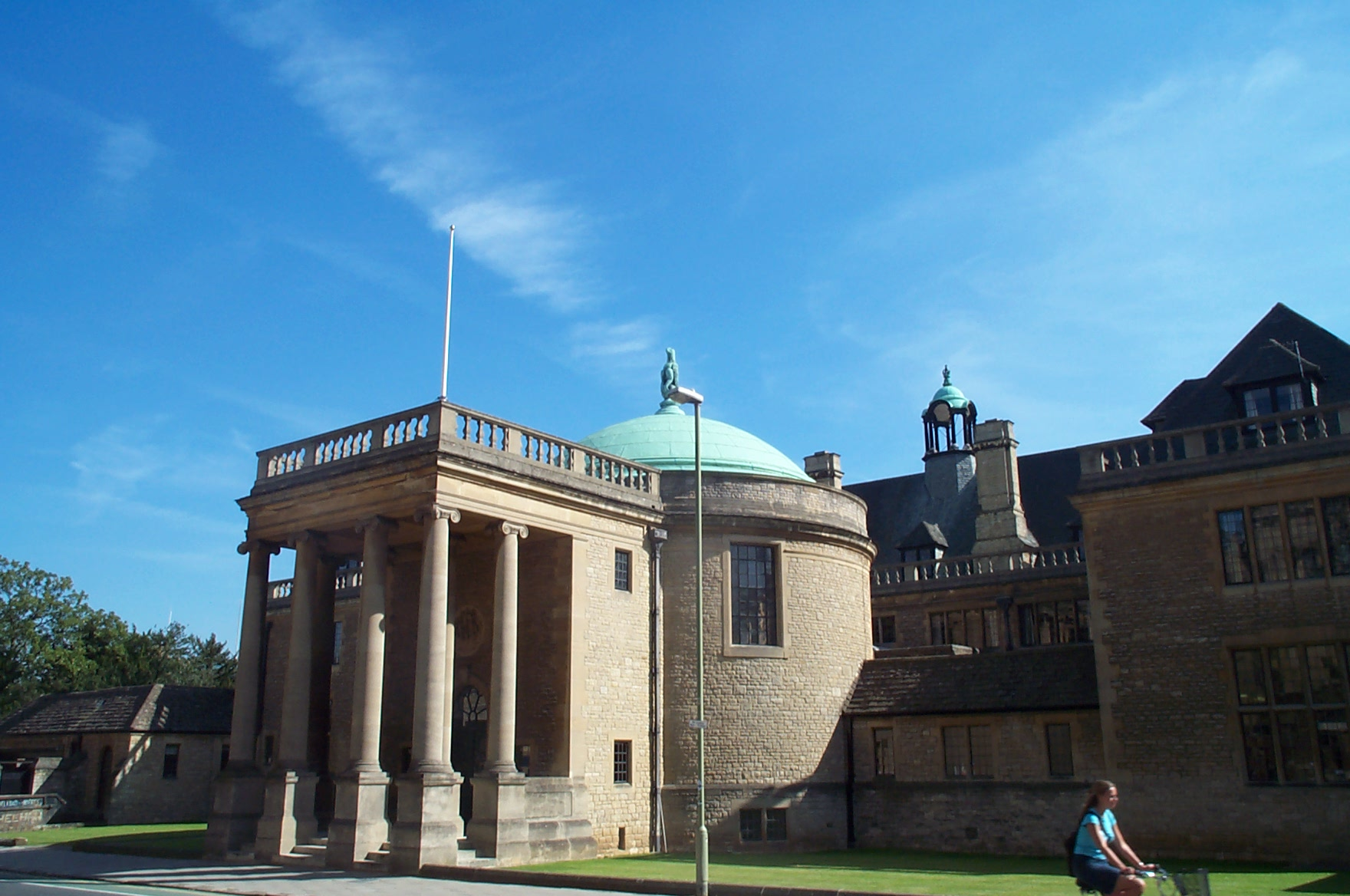
Rhodes House on the south side of South Parks Road, designed by Sir Herbert Baker and completed in 1928, on land bought from Wadham College.

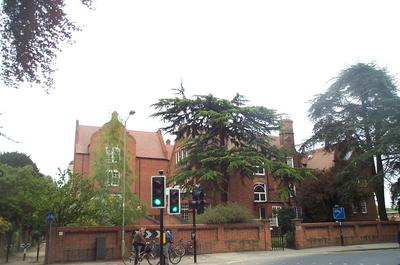
Linacre College from the corner of South Parks Road and St Cross Road.

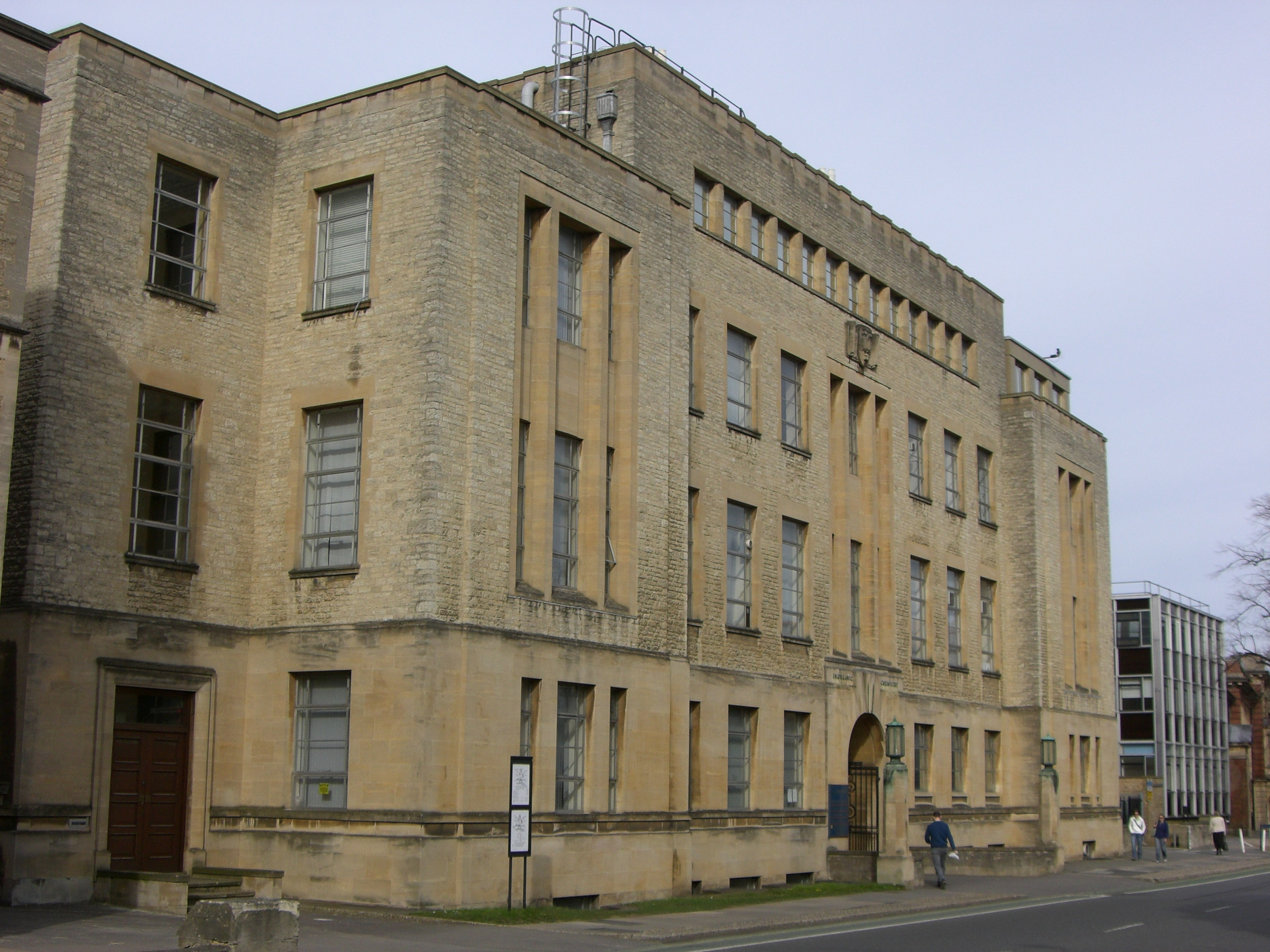
The Inorganic Chemistry Laboratory building on the north side of South Parks Road.

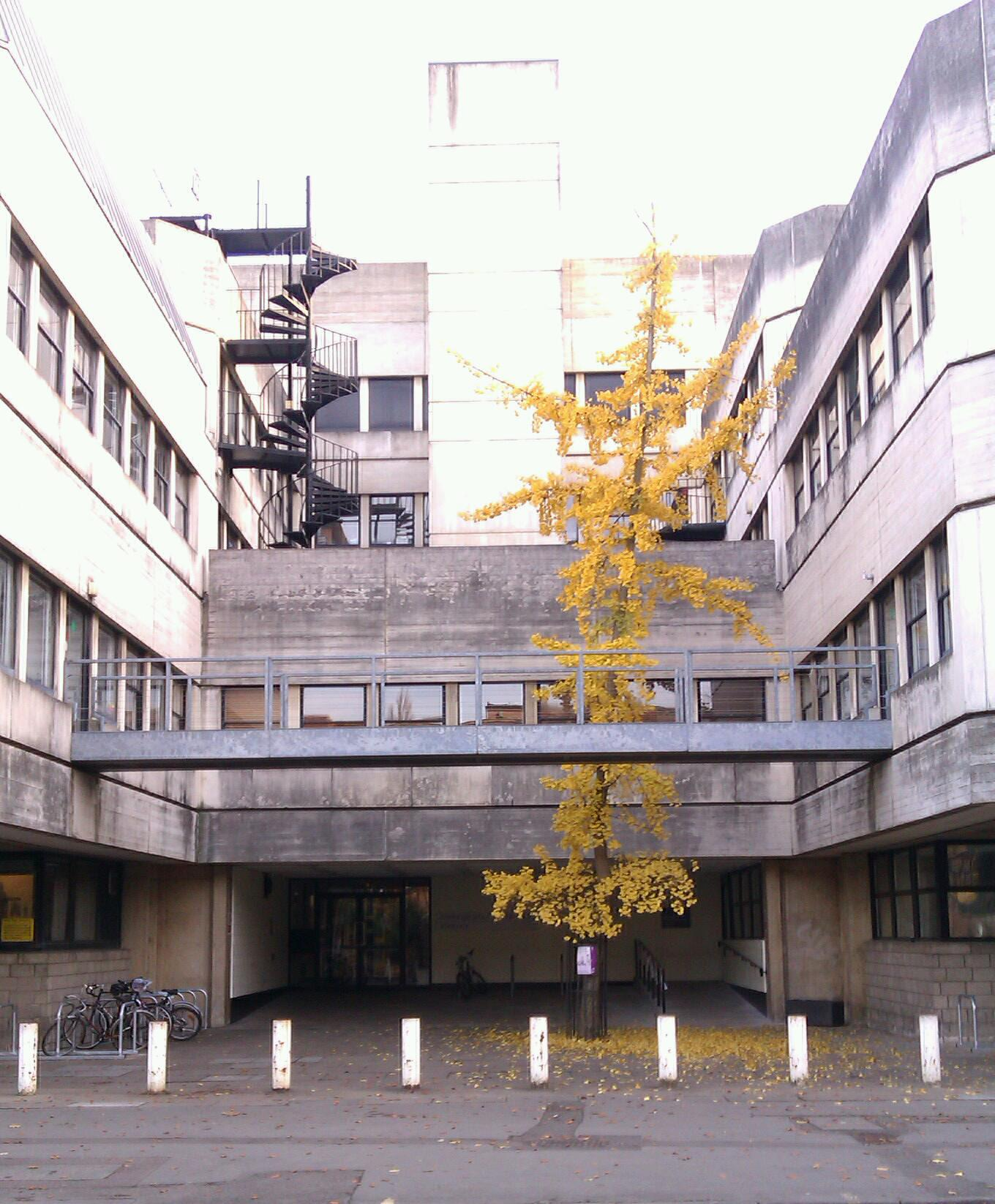
The Tinbergen Building, used by the zoology and psychology departments.

South Parks Road is a road in Oxford, England. It runs east–west past the main Science Area of the University of Oxford. Many of the university science departments are located nearby or face the road, including parts of the geography, zoology, chemistry, psychology and physiology departments. Also on the road is Rhodes House.

To the west, the road adjoins Parks Road at a T junction with the Radcliffe Science Library just to the north. In December 2018 it was announced that the proposed new graduate college of the university, Parks College, opening in September 2020, would be located on South Parks Road. The college has since been built under the name of Reuben College, and is connected to the Radcliffe Science Library. To the east, the road bends sharply south at Linacre College and becomes St Cross Road. A cycle route continues east towards New Marston, crossing the River Cherwell. About halfway along South Parks Road, Mansfield Road adjoins to the south. Mansfield College is close to South Parks Road in this section.

The road has been the scene of protests by animal rights protesters because of a new animal testing facility that has been built here. Pro-Test has been formed in reaction to the activities of the animal rights movement.

== Halifax House ==
Halifax House was located at 8 South Parks Road on the corner with Mansfield Road from 1961, a social club for people associated with Oxford University. The building has since been demolished to make way for new science facilities for the university. Evidence of Bronze Age barrows together with later prehistoric and early Roman field systems has been found on the site.

== See also ==
- Hooke Library
- Isis Innovation
- Physical and Theoretical Chemistry Laboratory
- Sir William Dunn School of Pathology
- Radcliffe Science Library
- Rhodes House
- Department of Plant Sciences, University of Oxford
- Department of Zoology, University of Oxford
