= St Cross, Oxford =

St Cross, Oxford may refer to:

- St Cross Church, Oxford
- St Cross College, Oxford
- St Cross Road, Oxford
