= Holywell Cemetery =

Cemetery in Oxford, England

Holywell Cemetery St Cross Cemetery
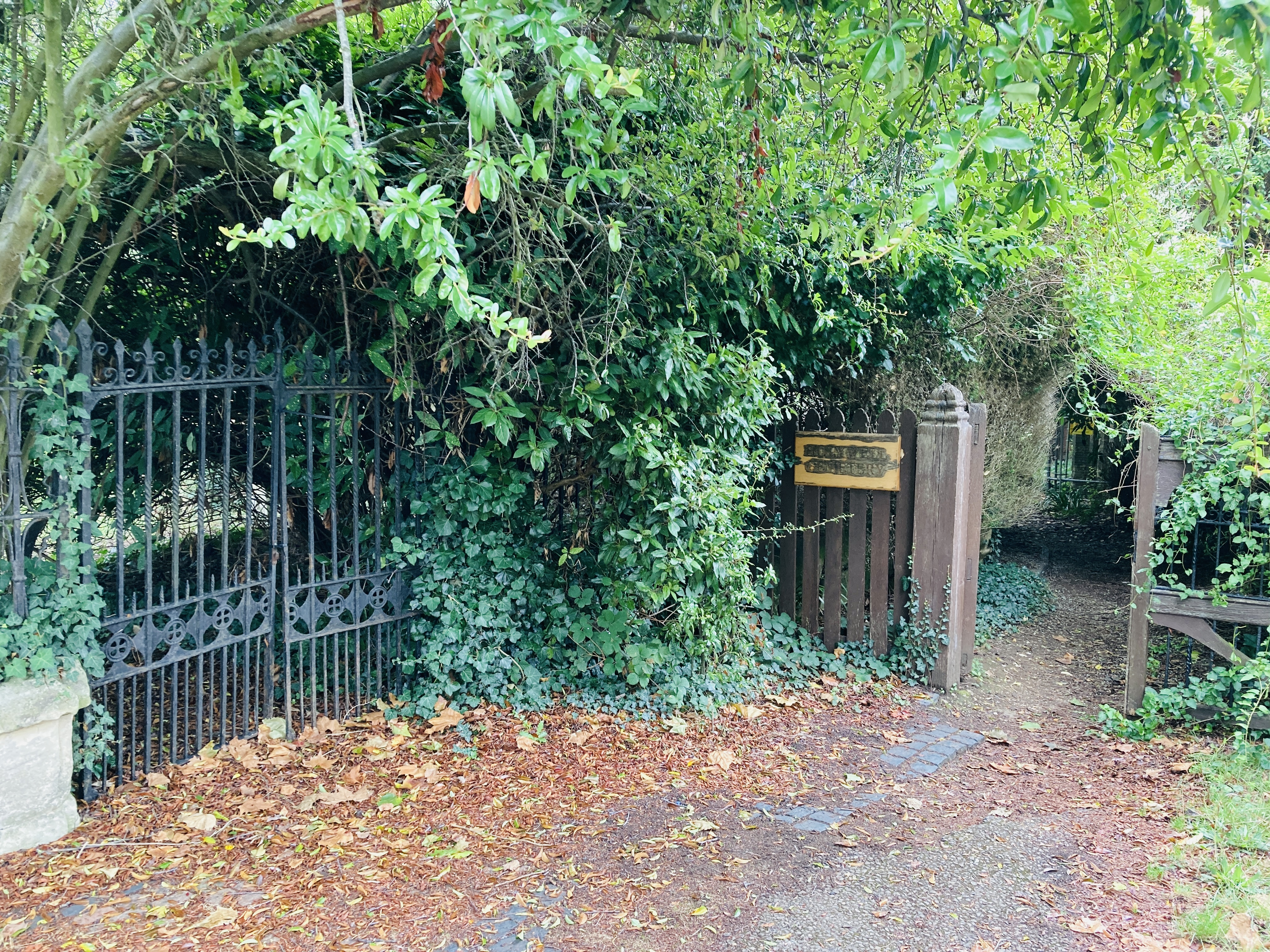
- The entrance to Holywell Cemetery in 2024
- Interactive map of Holywell Cemetery; St Cross Cemetery

Details
- Established: 1847
- Location: St Cross Church, Oxford
- Country: United Kingdom
- Coordinates: 51°45′21″N 1°14′50″W
- Style: Wildlife refuge
- Terms of lease: Closed to new burials

Holywell Cemetery lies behind St Cross Church in St Cross Road, Oxford, England, south of Holywell Manor on Manor Road and north of Longwall Street, in the parish of Holywell.

== History ==
In the mid-19th century, the graveyards of the six parishes in central Oxford became full, so Merton College made some of its land available to form the cemetery in 1847. The cemetery was established along with Osney Cemetery and St Sepulchre's Cemetery. In 1855, new burials were forbidden at all Oxford city churches, apart from existing vaults.

The cemetery is now a wildlife refuge with many birds (including pheasants that nest there), butterflies, and small and larger mammals, including muntjac deer and foxes. Hedgehogs are also known to live there.

== Notable interments and memorials ==
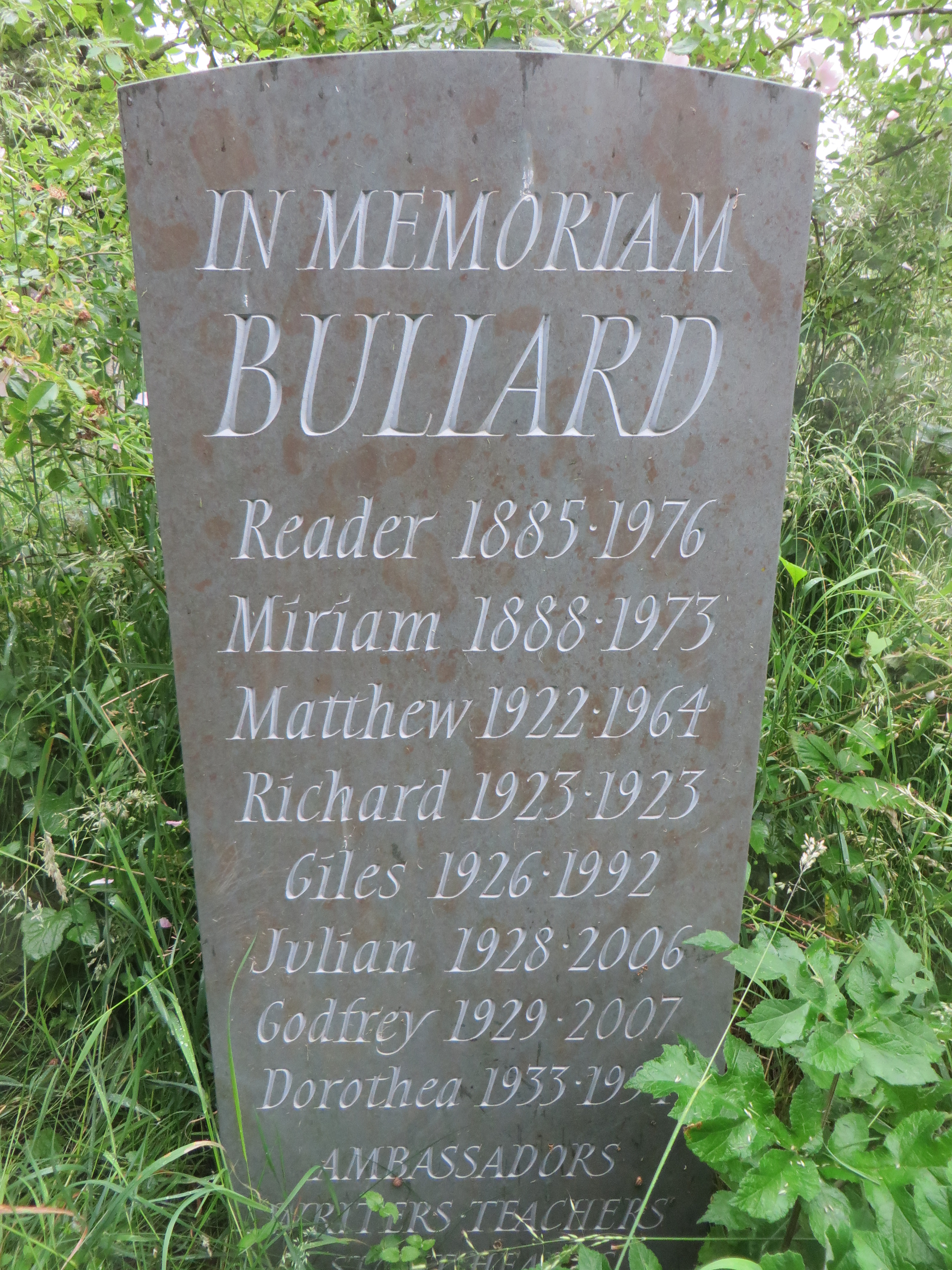
"In Memoriam Bullard" memorial stone in Holywell Cemetery

A number of well-known people are buried in the cemetery, including:

- Sir Henry Acland, physician and educator, and Sarah, Lady Acland, after whom the Acland Home is named
- James Blish, the American expatriate author
- Sir Reader Bullard and his sons Sir Giles Bullard and Sir Julian Bullard, all diplomats
- Sir Maurice Bowra, Warden of Wadham College, Oxford and Vice-Chancellor of Oxford University
- John William Burgon, Dean of Chichester Cathedral
- Theophilus Carter, said to be the model for the Mad Hatter in Lewis Carroll's Alice's Adventures in Wonderland
- George Claridge Druce, botanist and Mayor of Oxford
- Hugo Dyson, member of the Inklings
- Francis Edgeworth, statistician and economist
- Austin Farrer, Warden of Keble College, Oxford
- Kenneth Grahame, author of The Wind in the Willows
- Abel Hendy Jones Greenidge, classical historian formerly of Balliol, Hertford and Brasenose
- Francis Llewellyn Griffith, Egyptologist and founder of the Griffith Institute
- Nora Griffith, Egyptologist and founder of the Griffith Institute
- Charles Buller Heberden, Principal of Brasenose College, Oxford and Vice-Chancellor of Oxford University
- Andrew John Herbertson, geographer
- William West Jones, Archbishop of Cape Town
- Sir Richard Lodge, historian
- Agnes Catherine Maitland, educationist, principal at Somerville College
- Max Müller, philologist and Orientalist, Fellow at All Souls College, Oxford
- Walter Pater, essayist and critic
- Bartholomew Price, Master of Pembroke College, Oxford
- Lord Redcliffe-Maud, civil servant and Master of University College, Oxford, and his wife Jean Redcliffe-Maud
- Sir John Rhys, Principal of Jesus College, Oxford
- George Rolleston, physician and zoologist
- John Stainer, composer and organist
- Kenneth Tynan, theatre critic and author
- Sir Paul Vinogradoff, historian
- Sir Herbert Warren, President of Magdalen College, Oxford
- Charles Williams, novelist, poet, and member of the Inklings
- William Wallace, Scottish philosopher
- F. H. Bradley, British idealist philosopher
- A. C. Bradley, British literary scholar
- Henry George Woods, President of Trinity College, Oxford
- Margaret Louisa Woods, poet and novelist

A wooden grave marker that was used to mark the grave of the England Rugby captain Ronald Poulton-Palmer at Ploegsteert Wood is affixed to a wall in the cemetery.

The cemetery contains three war graves that are maintained and registered by the Commonwealth War Graves Commission – two British Army officers from the First World War and a Royal Air Force (RAF) officer from the Second World War.

== Friends ==
Friends of Holywell Cemetery has been established to raise funds and manage the cemetery.

== See also ==
- Osney Cemetery
- St Sepulchre's Cemetery
- Wolvercote Cemetery

== Sources ==
- Lack, Alastair (March 2010). "The Valhalla of Oxford". Oxfordshire Limited Edition. The Oxford Times: 35–39.
