= Raymond Petit =

Luxembourgish sculptor

Raymond Petit (born 26 October 1954) is a Luxembourgish sculptor. During his studies in the United States, Raymond Petit was initiated into the world of sculpture by following courses at the "William Howard Taft High School" in Los Angeles. He then embarked upon an artistic career with private and collective exhibitions that found a first recognition when he was granted the critics' prize at the VIIIth Biannual for Young Painters and Sculptors in Esch/Alzette in 1977.

Apart from working for exhibitions in Luxembourg, Oxford, London, Brussels, Rotterdam, Tokyo, Milan, Innsbruck, etc. Raymond Petit was also given commissions by the Luxembourg Government. Since May 1979 one of his sculptures highlights the entrance to the "Lycée Michel Lucius" in Luxembourg-City, and, ten years later, his monumental sculpture "Arch/Two People" is set up in the park of Useldange's Therapeutic Centre. Since 1993 one of his works enlivens the Town Hall of the parish of Hesperange and in 1995 he created a new cenotaph for the parish of Niederanven. Another monumental sculpture in front of the Integrated Centre for the Elderly in that same parish was inaugurated in 1998.

He is also the author of the book: "Everything you always wanted to know about European Unity but forgot to remember" European Unity

== Exhibitions ==
=== Private exhibitions ===
- 1976: Galerie "La Scatola", Luxembourg-City (L)
- 1978: Oxford Union Society, Oxford (UK)
- 1979: Studio exhibition, Luxembourg-City (L)
- 1981: Studio exhibition, Luxembourg-City (L)
- 1983: Studio exhibition, Luxembourg-City (L)
- 1987: Galerie "Le Cadre", Luxembourg-City (L)
- 1987: Centre "Ligue HMC", Capellen (L)
- 1994: Galerie "Charly's Gare", Hostert (L)
- 1995: Galerie "Espace Degré", Luxembourg-City (L)
- 1996: Galerie "Charly's Gare", Hostert (L)
- 1998: "Château de Bettembourg", Bettembourg (L)
- 1999: Hiscox Art Café, London (UK)
- 1999: "CIPA", Niederanven (L)
- 1999: Galerie "Antonio Battaglia", Milan (I)
- 1999: Galerie "Bertrand Kass", Innsbruck (A)
- 1999: Galerie Wagner-Schortgen, Luxembourg-Ville (L)
- 2000: ABN-AMRO Bank, Rotterdam (NL)
- 2001: Studio exhibition, Niederanven (L)
- 2001: Judenburg (A)
- 2002: Espace Paragon, Luxembourg-City (L)
- 2003: Import Festa, Komatsu (J)
- 2003: Luxembourg Embassy, Tokyo (J)
- 2005: Studio exhibition, Niederanven (L)
- 2007: Studio exhibition, Niederanven (L)

=== Collective exhibitions ===
- 1972: Art Fair, Los Angeles (USA)
- 1974–78: "Salon" of the Luxembourg Art Circle, Luxembourg-City (L)
- 1977: VIIIth Biannual for Young Painters and Sculptors, Esch-sur-Alzette (L)
- 1979: IXth Biannual for Young Painters and Sculptors, Esch-sur-Alzette (L)
- 1982: Burleighfield Arts Casting Studios' Artists Exhibition, Alwyn Gallery, London (UK)
- 1991: "Art in Luxembourg" exhibition organised in honour of the Luxembourg European Union Presidency in Luxembourg-City (L) and Brussels (B)
- 1998: "Salon Européen d'Art Alta Falesia", Houffalize (B)
- 1999: St. James's Art & Books, London (UK)
- 1999: Salon des Lauréats, Esch-sur-Alzette (L)
- 1999: "Art in Beaufort", Beaufort (L)
- 1999: VIème Salon de Peinture et Sculpture, Huldange (L)
- 2000: "Art in Beaufort", Beaufort (L)
- 2001: "Mythology 2001", Athens (Gr) and Luxembourg-City (L)
- 2001: "Art in Beaufort", Beaufort (L)
- 2002: "Art in Beaufort", Beaufort (L)
- 2002: "Mérite culturel", Sanem (L)
- 2003: "Art in Beaufort", Beaufort (L)
- 2003: "Voir et déguster", Schieren (L)
- 2004: "Art in Beaufort", Beaufort (L)
- 2004: "Oppen Art", Niederanven (L)
- 2004: "Voir et déguster", Consdorf (L)
- 2005: "Art in Beaufort", Beaufort (L)
- 2005: "Voir et déguster", Schieren (L)
- 2006: Galerie Bertrand Kass, Innsbruck (A)

== Monumental sculptures ==
- "Le Veilleur" (The Watchman), Lycée Michel Lucius, Luxembourg-City (L), 1979
- "Arc/Deux Personnes" (Arch/Two People), Therapy Centre, Useldange (L), 1989
- "Pietà", Town Hall of Hespérange (L), 1993
- "Monument aux Morts" (Cenotaph), Niederanven (L), 1995
- "Sérénité" (Serenity), Integrated Centre for the Elderly, Niederanven (L), 1998
- "Doncolser Wollef", Niederanven (L), 2007
- "Icarus", Holywell Manor, Balliol College, Oxford (UK), 2009

== Public collections ==
- Parish of Hespérange (L)
- Luxembourg Ministry of Foreign Affairs (L)
- ABN-AMRO Bank (L)

== Honorary distinctions ==
- "Prix de la Critique" and "Prix du Républicain Lorrain" at the VIIIth Biannual for Young Painters and Sculptors, Esch-sur-Alzette (L)
- "Prix du Luxemburger Wort" at the IXth Biannual for Young Painters and Sculptors, Esch-sur-Alzette (L)
- "Silver medal" of the French "société académique" "ARTS – SCIENCES – LETTRES" (2007)

== Bibliographical mentions ==
- "Art au Luxembourg", published by the Ministry of Foreign Affairs, 1991
- "Anthologie des Arts au Luxembourg", published by Editions Emile Borschette, 1992
- "Wer ist wer in Luxemburg" published by Roger Bour, 2000
- "Signatures – artistes plasticiens au Luxembourg" published by Editions Saint-Paul, 2001
- "Confronti attuale dell'imagine – Aktuelle Bildvergleiche" published by Bertrand Kass and Antonio Battaglia, 2002
- "Galerie Bertrand Kass 2002–2004" published by Bertrand Kass, 2004
- "Galerie Bertrand Kass 2006–2007"
- "Galerie Bertrand Kass 2008–2010"
- "Une oeuvre en cours" / Portrait de l’artiste-sculpteur raymond j-m petit" published by Gilbert Rischette, 2007 PetitOeuvre
