= Kenneth Bell =

Kenneth Bell may refer to:

- Kenneth B. Bell (born 1956), Florida Supreme Court Justice
- Kenneth D. Bell (born 1958), United States District Judge
- Kenneth Norman Bell (1884–1951), fellow of Balliol College, Oxford
- Kenneth Ridley Bell (1927–2014), a businessman and exporter from Newcastle
- Ken Bell (1914–2000), Canadian photographer who participated in the Normandy Landings
- Ken Bell (American football) (born 1964), American football return specialist
- Kenny Bell (born 1992), American football wide receiver
- Ken Bell (songwriter), songwriter and former member of the band Bama
