= Charles Fay =

Charles Fay may refer to:

- Charles Ernest Fay (1846–1931), American alpinist and educator
- Charles Joseph Fay (c. 1842–1895), Irish politician
- Charles Ryle Fay (1884–1961), British economic historian
