= Manor Road =

Manor Road may refer to:

- Manor Road, Barnet, a major road linking Wood Street and Mays Lane
- Manor Road, Oxford, England
- Manor Road (Phoenix, Maryland), USA
- Manor Road railway station, Merseyside, England
