= Bodleian Law Library =

Library in Oxford, England

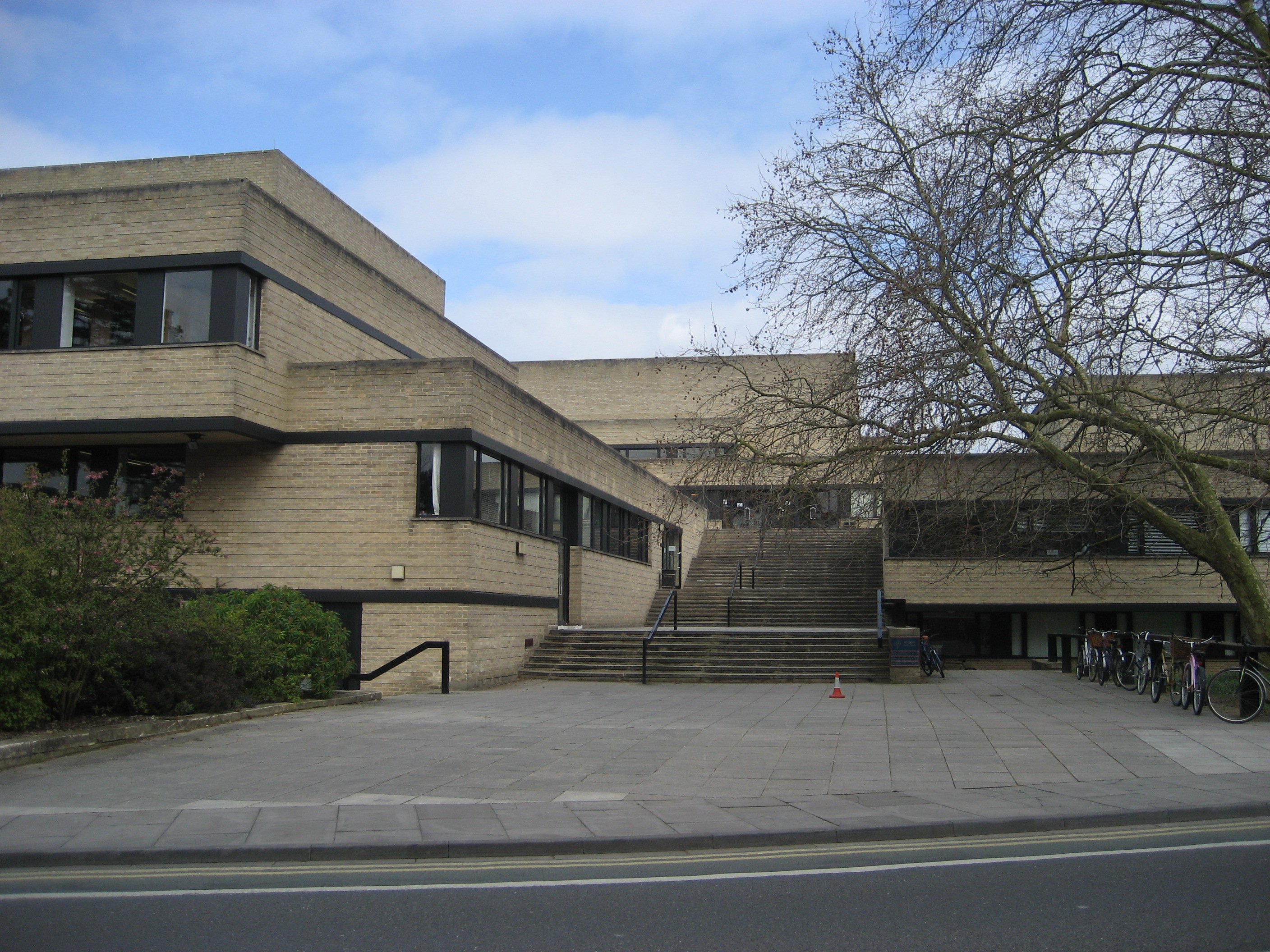
- Stairs leading to the Bodleian Law Library.
- 51.757139160655335°N 1.248078795634106°W
- Location: Oxford, England
- Type: Law library
- Established: 1964
- Architects: Leslie Martin, Colin St John Wilson

Collection
- Legal deposit: yes

Other information
- Affiliation: University of Oxford
- Website: https://www.bodleian.ox.ac.uk/libraries/law

Location of the Bodleian Law Library within central Oxford

The Bodleian Law Library (BLL) is an academic library in Oxford, England. It is part of Oxford University, the Bodleian Libraries, and is also the library of the Faculty of Law. It is situated in part of the Grade II*-listed St Cross Building on St Cross Road in the parish of Holywell, on the corner of Manor Road.

== Overview ==
The library is one of the largest open-access law libraries in Europe. Opened in 1964, as of 2014 it contains over 550,000 volumes on 16,000 linear metres of shelving, and is housed in purpose-built library accommodation designed by the distinguished architects Sir Leslie Martin and Colin St John Wilson.

In 1998, The Rhodes Trust provided a donation to establish a trust fund to support the Commonwealth Collection.

In 2016, The Supreme Court Library of Korea partnered with the Bodleian Law Library to provide access to books about Korean law.

The BLL benefits from the Bodleian's status as a library of legal deposit, by which the BLL has the right to claim a copy of any printed legal material published in the United Kingdom or Ireland. Together with its position as an official Documentation Centre for the European Union and its significant expenditure on foreign legal materials, this means that the BLL adds more than 10,000 new items to its stock each year.

The BLL serves a wide and expanding range of university and external readers. Its primary 'client' base is the University of Oxford's Faculty of Law which, with over 1,100 undergraduate and postgraduate students and 80 academic staff, is the largest law faculty in the United Kingdom. At the same time, and because of its legal deposit status, the BLL is also used extensively by legal firms, lawyers, and individual researchers from both home and abroad.

The BLL collection supports the teaching and research of Law at the University of Oxford, and shares Criminology and Socio-Legal Studies with the Social Science Library. The St Cross Building is adjacent to the Social Science Building in Manor Road, which houses the Social Sciences departments, including the Economics Department, as well as the Social Science Library.

== Collection ==
The BLL collection has been built up over a period of four centuries, both from the legal deposit intake, and from specific purchases based on recommendations from academics and researchers alike. The core primary legal materials for the UK, the Commonwealth countries, the US, the EU, individual European countries, and international law are collected on an ongoing basis, together with key legal texts for all jurisdictions. The BLL holds full sets of previous editions of major UK legal monographs on the open shelves.

It receives over 2,000 serial titles per annum, including law reports, legislation, journals and looseleaf services from all the jurisdictions held in the collection. The BLL holds several special collections, including rare books, the Viner collection, the Bandar Collection of Islamic Law, and the Kahn-Freund collection of labour law material.

Readers have access to all leading UK legal databases, together with a large number of foreign legal databases, supporting the research undertaken by members of the faculty. Network printing, scanning and photocopying are provided.

== Facilities ==
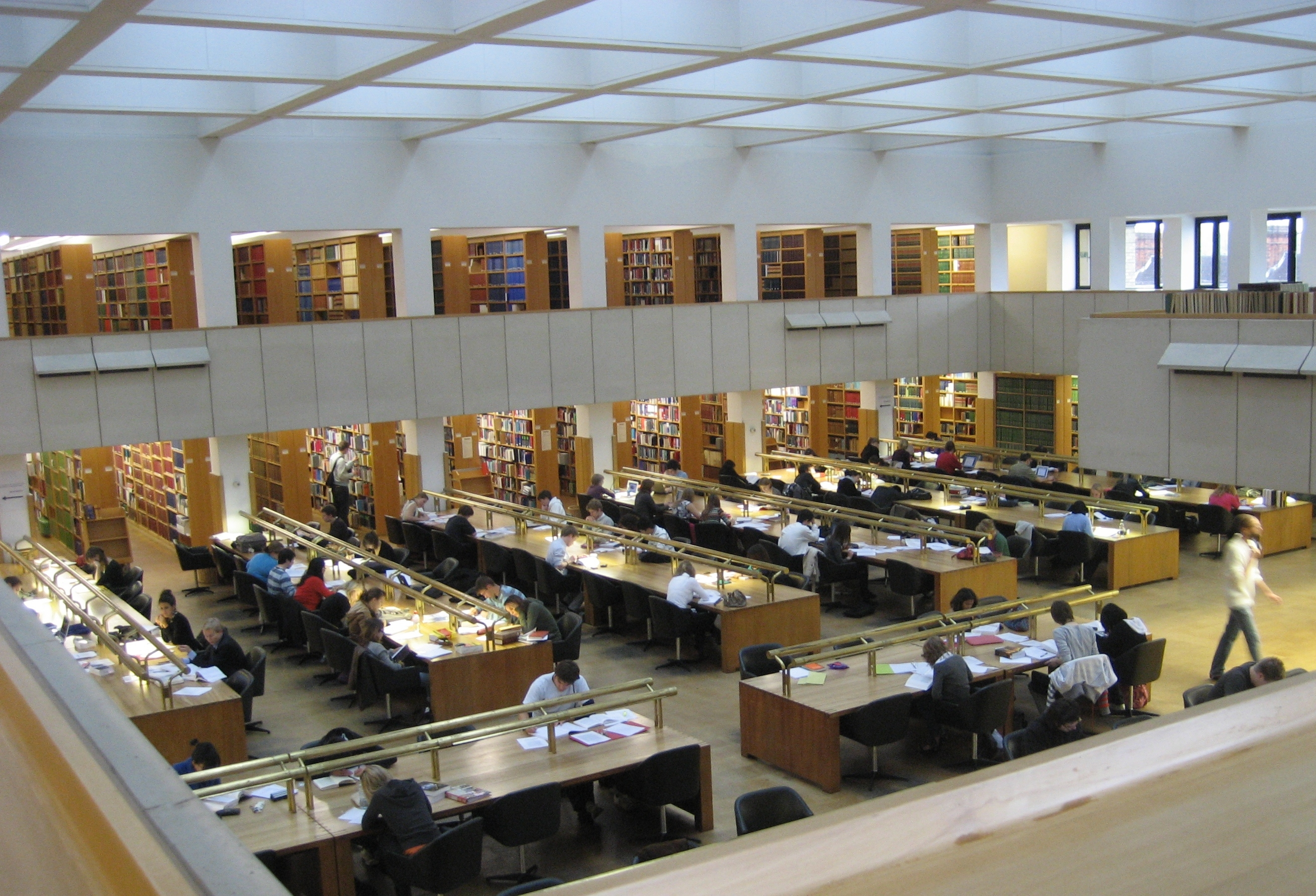
Main Reading Room.

The BLL was designed to hold the law collection of the Bodleian Library on open access shelves, ensuring ready access at all times to scholars. Seating is provided for 430 readers, with over one third of seats reserved for postgraduate student use.

There is a Graduate Reading Room. This area occupies a separate wing, and provides students with ethernet access, several PCs, and wireless access for laptops.

The BLL has a total of 40 PCs for reader use as of 2023. The PCs in the Freshfields IT room on the lower floor and in the Gallery computer room require readers to log in, but there are a few PCs for searching the catalogue on each floor. Wireless access for laptop computers is provided throughout most areas of the library and is accessed using the same login as the library PCs.

The Baker McKenzie room is available for student use for group discussion, as well as carrel facilities which are offered on a shared basis.

== Legal research ==
The Law Library staff provide an extensive teaching programme to all postgraduate and undergraduate students. The Legal Research Skills Programme is a compulsory first year subject for undergraduates; all postgraduates are provided with detailed library induction, as well as a wide range of research classes offered each term. Legal information guides to specific countries and to legal subjects is available in leaflet form.

== In pop culture ==
In 2019, this building is used as the backdrop to the police station in the ITV television series Endeavour.
