= Snell Exhibition =

Scholarship

The Snell Exhibition is an annual scholarship awarded to students of the University of Glasgow to allow them to undertake postgraduate study at Balliol College, Oxford. The award was founded by the bequest of Sir John Snell in a will made in 1677, although the original stipulation referred to the University of Oxford, rather than Balliol in particular. Snell died on 6 August 1679, but wrangling over the will meant that it was nearly twenty years before the first scholarships were awarded; the first four Snell Exhibitioners were admitted to Balliol in mid-1699.

Snell had been a Royalist in the Civil War, and was later secretary to the Duke of Monmouth and had the management of his Scottish estates. He intended the bequest to be used to educate Scottish clergymen for the then-established Scottish Episcopal Church. By Adam Smith's day, the bequest was mostly regarded as an educational charity, though its exact status was not settled until later. "By the will of John Snell his exhibitors were under bond to take Anglican orders and return to Scotland, but the penalty was not enforced in the case of Adam Smith and numerous others." (C. R. Fay, quoting The Times obituary of Smith.) Snell is buried in St Cross Church, which since 2011 has housed Balliol's Special Collections Library, being next to the college's graduate centre, Holywell Manor.

Each year, there is an annual dinner held at Balliol and attended by delegates of Balliol, Glasgow and St John's College, Cambridge, in honour of the foundation.

== Notable Exhibitioners ==
Notable Snell Exhibitioners include:

- W. G. S. Adams: political scientist and public servant
- Hely Hutchinson Almond: headmaster of Loretto School
- Matthew Baillie: physician and pathologist
- Captain Robert Blair: soldier
- Sir Drummond Bone: Master of Balliol and former Vice-Chancellor of the University of Liverpool
- Denis Brogan: historian
- Robert Browning: Byzantinist
- Edward Caird: philosopher
- Professor Tom Campbell: legal philosopher
- John Douglas: Bishop of Salisbury
- Sir William Hamilton: metaphysician
- Andrew Lang: writer
- John Gibson Lockhart: writer
- Professor Sir Neil MacCormick: jurist and MEP
- Martin McLaughlin: FIAT-Serena Professor of Italian, Oxford
- Archibald Main: ecclesiastical historian
- J. H. Muirhead: philosopher
- John Nichol: biographer
- Herbert James Paton: philosopher
- Murray Pittock: academic
- Robert Ranken: cricketer
- John Campbell Shairp: literary critic
- Adam Smith: moral philosopher
- John Smith: Savilian Professor of Geometry, Oxford
- James Stirling: mathematician
- Richard Susskind: legal and IT adviser
- Archibald Campbell Tait: Archbishop of Canterbury
- Diane Watt: medievalist
- W. S. Watt: classicist
