= John Snell =

Scottish educational benefactor (1629–1679)

- Born: 1629; Ayrshire, Scotland
- Died: 6 August 1679 (aged 49–50)
- Education: University of Glasgow

Sir John Snell (1629 – 6 August 1679), founder of the Snell Exhibitions at the University of Oxford, was born in Ayrshire, Scotland, the son of a blacksmith. He attended the University of Glasgow from 1642 to 1644.

He joined the royalists during the English Civil War, and fought in several battles, including the Battle of Worcester. Thereafter he took refuge in Cheshire, where he met Sir Orlando Bridgeman, whose clerk he became, being raised to the offices of court-crier and seal-bearer as his patron was promoted to those of judge and Lord Keeper.

Later he was secretary to the Duke of Monmouth and had the management of his Scottish estates. He died at Oxford in 1679 and was buried in St Cross Church, Oxford, leaving a bequest for sending students from the University of Glasgow to an Oxford college or hall. The Court of Chancery decided in 1693 that Balliol should receive the beneficiaries. Adam Smith was one beneficiary of the Snell Scholarship.
