= George Napper =

English Roman Catholic priest

Blessed George Napper
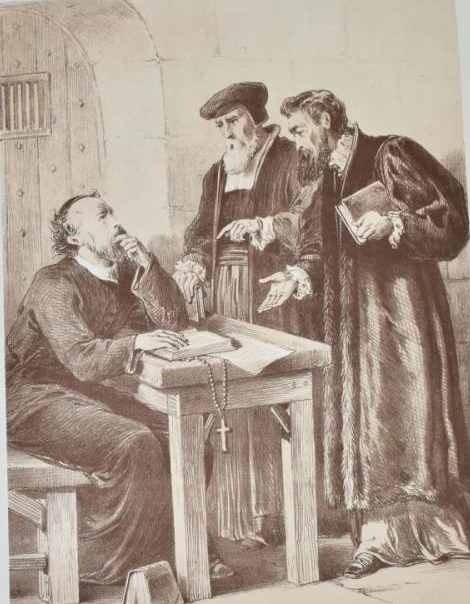
- George Nappier, "They began to offer him some speeches". Illustration for Memoirs of Missionary Priests by Bishop Challoner (Jack, 1878).

Martyr
- Born: c. 1550; Holywell Manor, Oxford, England
- Died: 9 November 1610 (aged 59 - 60); Oxford Castle, Oxfordshire, England
- Beatified: 15 December 1929 by Pope Pius XI
- Feast: 9 November (individual); 29 October (one of the Douai Martyrs)

George Napper (or Napier; c. 1550 – 9 November 1610) was an English Catholic priest murdered during the Reformation. He is recognized as a Catholic martyr, having been beatified in 1929 by Pope Pius XI.

== Life ==
George Napper was a son of Edward Napper (died in 1558), sometime Fellow of All Souls College, Oxford, by Anne, his second wife, daughter of John Peto, of Chesterton, Warwickshire, and niece of Cardinal William Peto. He entered Corpus Christi College, Oxford, 5 January 1566, but was ejected in 1568 as a recusant.

On 24 August 1579 he visited the English College at Reims, and by December 1580 he had been imprisoned. He was still in the Wood Street Counter, London, on 30 September 1588; but was freed in June 1589, on acknowledging the royal supremacy.

He entered the English College, Douai in 1596, and was sent on the English mission in 1603. He appears to have lived with his brother William at Holywell Manor, Oxford. He was arrested at Kirtlington, four miles from Woodstock, very early in the morning of 19 July 1610, when he had on him a pyx containing two consecrated Hosts as well as a small reliquary. Brought before Sir Francis Eure at Upper Heyford (Wood says before a justice named Chamberlain) he was strictly searched; but the constable found only his breviary, his holy oils, and a needle case with thread and thimble.

The next day he was sent to Oxford Castle, and indicted at the session soon after under the Jesuits, etc. Act 1584 for being a Catholic priest. The possession of the oils was held to be conclusive and he was condemned, but reprieved. In gaol he reconciled a condemned felon named Falkner, and this was held to aggravate his crime, but as late as 2 November it was believed that he would have his sentence commuted to one of banishment. As he refused the oath of allegiance, he was condemned to death.

He was executed between one and two in the afternoon, having said Mass that morning. His head according to Wood was set up on Tom Gateway; according to Richard Challoner's statement on Christ Church steeple. His quarters were placed on the four city gates, but at least some were secretly removed, and buried in the chapel (now a barn) of Sandford manor, formerly a preceptory of Knights Templar.

== Honours ==
A plaque in his honour was unveiled at Oxford Castle on 23 October 2010.

Blessed George Napier Roman Catholic School in Banbury is named after him.

== See also ==
- Catholic Church in the United Kingdom
- Douai Martyrs
