= Holywell, Oxford =

Coordinates: 51.757°N 1.248°W

Holywell
- Holywell Manor

- Location within Oxfordshire
- District: Oxford
- Shire county: Oxfordshire
- Region: South East
- Country: England
- Sovereign state: United Kingdom
- Post town: Oxford
- Postcode district: OX1
- Dialling code: 01865
- Police: Thames Valley
- Fire: Oxfordshire
- Ambulance: South Central
- UK Parliament: Oxford East

Holywell was a parish in the city of Oxford, in Oxfordshire, England, created in 1769. It was abolished for civil purposes in 1926 and for ecclesiastical purposes in 1966.

The toponym is derived from the well of Saint Winifred and Saint Margaret.

The Holywell area historically formed part of the parish of St Aldate's. St Cross Church was built as a chapel of ease to serve the area; the date the chapel was established is unknown, but the oldest parts of the current building date back to the 11th century. The church was raised to the status of a parish church in 1769 and its former chapelry became a parish, known as "Oxford St Cross or Holywell" for ecclesiastical purposes, or just "Holywell" for civil purposes. The parish covered an area to the north-east of the city centre, and was within the borough boundaries of Oxford.

The civil parish was abolished in 1926 when all the urban parishes within Oxford were merged into a single parish matching the borough. At the 1921 census (the last before the abolition of the civil parish), Holywell had a population of 846. The ecclesiastical parish was subsequently abolished in 1966.

== See also ==
- St Cross Church, Oxford
- Holywell Cemetery
- Holywell Manor
- Holywell Music Room
- Holywell Street
