= John Smith (anatomist and chemist) =

Scottish physician and academic (1721-1797)

John Smith (1721–1797) was a Scottish physician and academic.

Smith was born in Maybole, Scotland, where his father, William, was a merchant. He studied at the University of Glasgow beginning in 1736, entered Balliol College, Oxford in 1744 with the support of the Snell Exhibition, and earned a B.A. in 1748 and an M.A. in 1751 from Balliol. He then studied under Nathan Alcock in St Mary Hall, earning his doctorate in 1757. Alcock left Oxford for Bath in the same year, and Smith took his place. At Oxford, he taught anatomy and chemistry. Despite not being a mathematician, he held the Savilian chair of geometry from 1766 until his death in 1797.
