= Pauline Gregg =

British historian

Pauline Emily Meiggs (née Gregg; 17 July 1909 – 11 March 2006), who wrote under the name Pauline Gregg, was a British historian.

== Early life and education ==
Born at Palmers Green, north London, to working-class parents Thomas James Nathaniel Gregg, a Post Office mail sorter, and Elizabeth Janette (née Kuttner), Gregg was attracted to socialism during her schooldays, joining the Labour League of Youth and Independent Labour Party, and addressing meetings from a coal cart, later from Speakers' Corner in Hyde Park. Having started work as a secretary at Longman, in 1932 she was able, with a loan from Middlesex County Council, to take a place at the London School of Economics. Her doctorate, on John Lilburne, leader of the Levellers, was the basis of a book, Free-Born John, published in 1961.

== Career ==
Gregg was offered a lectureship at Hillcroft College, Surbiton, south-west London, but joined the Ministry of Supply when the Second World War began, and was posted to Warwick. There she met Russell Meiggs, a classics fellow at Balliol College, Oxford; they married in 1941. From 1946, they were in charge of Holywell Manor, Oxford, an annexe of Balliol, housing fifty undergraduates; although finding housework dull, Gregg was "a dashing hostess". During this time, Gregg daily researched at the Bodleian Library; her first book, A Social and Economic History of Britain 1760-1950, became a standard reference work, and her "definitive" biographies of King Charles I and the regicide Cromwell were well-regarded, C. V. Wedgwood, herself an expert on 17th century English history and author of many books on the period, calling the former "the fullest and most carefully compiled that we are ever likely to have".

== Personal life ==
Gregg and her husband, Russell Meiggs, had two daughters. She was survived by them, and by seven grandchildren and four great-grandchildren.

== Works ==
Gregg's published works concentrated on the period of the English Civil Wars of the 17th century and the history of social life in Britain.

Her writings include:

- King Charles I: Biography of Charles I.
- Free-Born John: Biography of John Lilburne.
- Modern Britain: A social and economic history since 1760.
- The Welfare State: An economic and social history of Great Britain from 1945 to the present day (see Welfare state).
- Oliver Cromwell: Biography of Oliver Cromwell.
- The Chain of History: The story of the main links in the chain of man's development from the Stone Age to the end of the 19th century.
- Black Death to Industrial Revolution: A Social and Economic History of England from the time of the Black Death to the Industrial Revolution.
