= Diane Watt =

British medievalist

Diane Watt FLSW
- Occupation: Medievalist

Academic background
- Education: University of Oxford

Academic work
- Discipline: Medieval literature
- Sub-discipline: Medieval women's literature
- Institutions: Aberystwyth University, University of Surrey

Diane Watt is a British medievalist, currently professor of medieval English literature at the University of Surrey. She previously held a personal chair at Aberystwyth University, where she was deputy director of the Institute of Medieval and early modern Studies (IMEMS). She was Charles A. Owen Jr. Distinguished Visiting professor of Medieval Studies at the University of Connecticut in 2005. She was awarded a Snell Exhibition to study at Balliol College, University of Oxford, and was awarded her DPhil in English Literature in 1993. She is a Fellow of the Learned Society of Wales.

== Works ==
Watt is the author of several books on medieval women's writing: Secretaries of God, Medieval Women's Writing, Women, Writing and Religion and God's Own Gentlewoman: the Life of Margaret Paston. She has also written a study of the work of Chaucer's friend and literary executor John Gower, entitled Amoral Gower which received critical praise in the journal Speculum. She was awarded the John Hurt Fisher Prize for "significant contribution to the field of John Gower Studies" in 2004. She has also published an edition of the letters of the Paston women, and has edited and co-edited a number of other works.The Lesbian Premodern, which she co-edited with Noreen Giffney and Michelle M. Sauer was nominated for a Lambda Literary Award in the LGBT Anthology category. Women and Medieval Literary Culture, which Watt co-edited with Corinne Saunders, was selected as a Choice 'Outstanding Academic Title' in 2024.

Watt was awarded a Leverhulme Trust Major Research Fellowship (Note: Major Research Fellowships are awarded to "enable well-established and distinguished researchers in the humanities and social sciences to devote themselves to a single research project of outstanding originality and significance".) in 2016 for her project "Women's Literary Culture Before the Conquest". From 2015 to 2017 she led the Leverhulme-funded international research network, "Women's Literary Culture and the Medieval English Canon".

== Publications ==
- Secretaries of God. DS Brewer. 1997. ISBN 0859916146.
- Amoral Gower. U of Minnesota P. 2003. ISBN 9780816640287.
- The Paston Women: Selected Letters. Boydell & Brewer. 2004. ISBN 9781843840244.
- Medieval Women's Writing. Polity. 2007. ISBN 978-0-7456-3255-1.
- Women, Writing and Religion in England and Beyond, 650-1100. Bloomsbury. 2019. ISBN 9781474270625.
- Women and Medieval Literary Culture from the Early Middle Ages to the Fifteenth Century. Cambridge University Press. 2023. ISBN 1108835910.
- God's Own Gentlewoman: the Life of Margaret Paston. Icon. 2024. ISBN 9781837731640.
