= Russell Meiggs =

British ancient historian (1902–1989)

- Born: 2 October 1902; Balham, London
- Died: 24 June 1989 (aged 86)
- Spouse: Pauline Gregg (m. 1941)

Academic background
- Education: Christ's Hospital; Keble College, Oxford

Academic work
- Discipline: Ancient history
- Institutions: Balliol College, Oxford

Russell Meiggs (20 October 1902 – 24 June 1989) was a British ancient historian. He did extensive research on the Roman port city of Ostia.

== Early life and education ==
Meiggs was born at Balham, south London, son of William Herrick Meiggs (1866–1939), sometime self-styled "general merchant" declared bankrupt in 1916, and his wife Mary Gertrude (née May). The former success of the Meiggs family was diminished by the time Russell Meiggs was born; his grandfather "died almost destitute" after political developments in Argentina ruined a business venture, and William Meiggs, being the fourth son, had to make his own way in the world. He had eloped with Mary to Argentina in 1897, their first child, Helen, being born at Buenos Aires in 1898. The family settled in London, but William left the family, subsequently going to Argentina and elsewhere, with Meiggs "as a child... led to believe his father was dead"; despite William surviving until 1939, "Russell felt no obligation toward him". Mary "brought up her children in poverty", a paternal aunt securing a place for Meiggs at Christ's Hospital; he subsequently went up to Keble College, Oxford, where he took a First in Classical Moderations in 1923 followed by a First in Literae Humaniores in 1925.

== Career ==
Meiggs was Fellow and Tutor in Ancient History (and Prefect of the College 1945- 1969) at Balliol College, Oxford, from 1939 to 1970. He "mastered the entire field" of the study of classical antiquity, as opposed to the increasing popularity of specialism; he "taught both Greek and Roman history, lectured on epigraphy, and worked closely with archaeologists, although, in the old Oxford manner, he published almost nothing for decades". He was praefectus of Holywell Manor, an annexe ten minutes from Balliol, home to fifty graduates, where his wife was "a dashing hostess"; Meiggs's daily procession to the college was a popular subject of tourist photography.

Meiggs's early writings were closely related to his teaching; one a "masterly revision" of Bury's History of Greece, another "a large collection of sources in the original tongues for the history of Greece" undertaken with Antony Andrewes. Despite a wide range of interests which held potential as subjects for books- "a history of the Roman port of Ostia based on the exciting archaeological discoveries, a synthetic treatment of the fifth-century Athenian empire in the light of the great epigraphical material (above all, the Athenian tribute lists), a study of Herodotus"- Meiggs's first major work, Roman Ostia, was produced "in the midst of a crushing schedule of teaching and college affairs"; his later writing took place after his retirement.

He was a periodic visiting professor in the Classics Department at Swarthmore College, Pennsylvania, in the 1970s, where he taught (among other classes) Greece in the Fifth Century (BCE) and Roman Ostia. In 1981, he was elected to the American Philosophical Society in 1981. During World War II he worked at the Ministry of Supply, where he was chief labour officer, responsible for home timber production. This experience led him to formulate an interest in a survey of trees and timber in the ancient world as a prospective topic of study, Trees and Timber in the Ancient Mediterranean World eventually being published in 1982.

His eccentricity was legendary; his "flaring shoulder-length gray hair, massive black eyebrows, leathery skin, and Aztec profile" and "jaunty disregard of conventional formalities" made him a popular and admired figure amongst undergraduates. His papers are in the Balliol College library.

== Personal life ==
In 1941, Meiggs married the historian Pauline Gregg (1909–2006). They had met at the Ministry of Supply. They had two daughters.

== Bibliography ==
- Home Timber Production, 1939-1945 (1949)
- The Athenian Empire (1972)
- Roman Ostia (1960; 2nd ed. 1973)
- (with J. B. Bury) A history of Greece to the death of Alexander the Great (1978) multiple editions.
- Trees and timber in the ancient Mediterranean world (1982).
- ed. (with David Lewis) A selection of Greek historical inscriptions to the end of the fifth century B.C. (1969; new ed., 1988)
- Farm forestry in the ancient Mediterranean (1989)
- A. Gallina Zevi, ed. 'Roman Ostia' revisited : archaeological and historical papers in memory of Russell Meiggs (1996)
