= St Cross Road =

Road in Oxford, England

Coordinates: 51°45′27″N 1°14′57″W

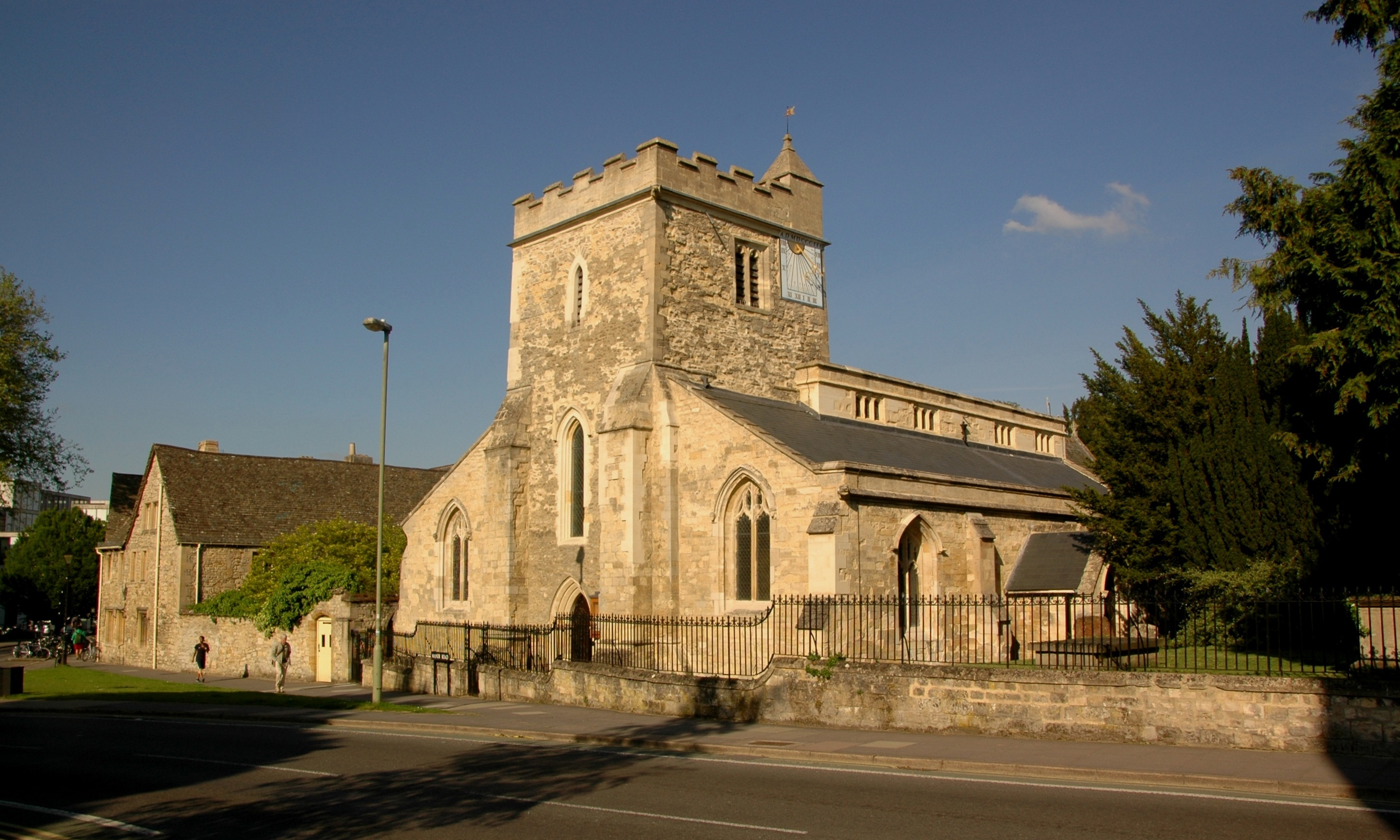
St Cross Church on St Cross Road.

St Cross Road is a road in Oxford, England. It links South Parks Road to the north and Longwall Street to the south, where it also meets Holywell Street. The road is named after St Cross Church.

Linacre College, one of the colleges in the University of Oxford, is located at the northern end, opposite the Tinbergen Building, used by the university's Department of Zoology and Department of Experimental Psychology. St Catherine's College, another Oxford University college, is in Manor Road, a cul de sac east off St Cross Road. The Oxford University Faculty of Law and Bodleian Law Library are on the corner with Manor Road. Holywell Manor, St Cross Church, Holywell Cemetery, and Jowett Walk are at the southern end.

St Cross College (now in St Giles'), one of the Oxford University colleges, used to be located in St Cross Road. The College still has an Annexe here.

Statue of Dervorguilla of Galloway at Master's Fields on St Cross Road

A statue of Dervorguilla of Galloway by Alex Wenham was installed at Master's Fields, Balliol College student accommodation on St Cross Road, in 2025.

== Gallery ==
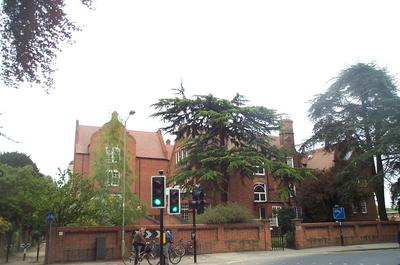
Linacre College at the northern end of St Cross Road.

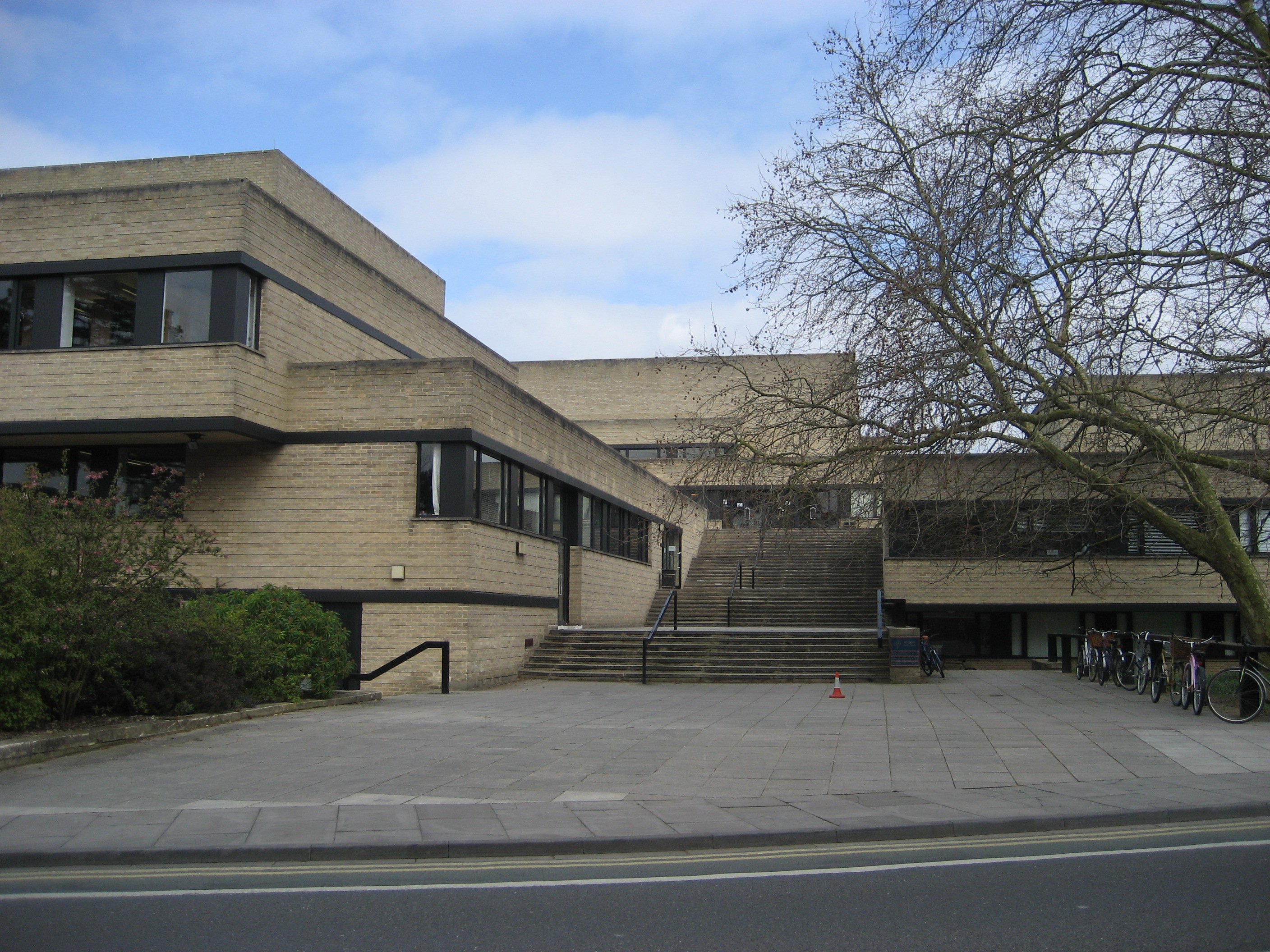
Stairs leading to the Bodleian Law Library on St Cross Road.

Holywell Manor, at the junction with Manor Road.

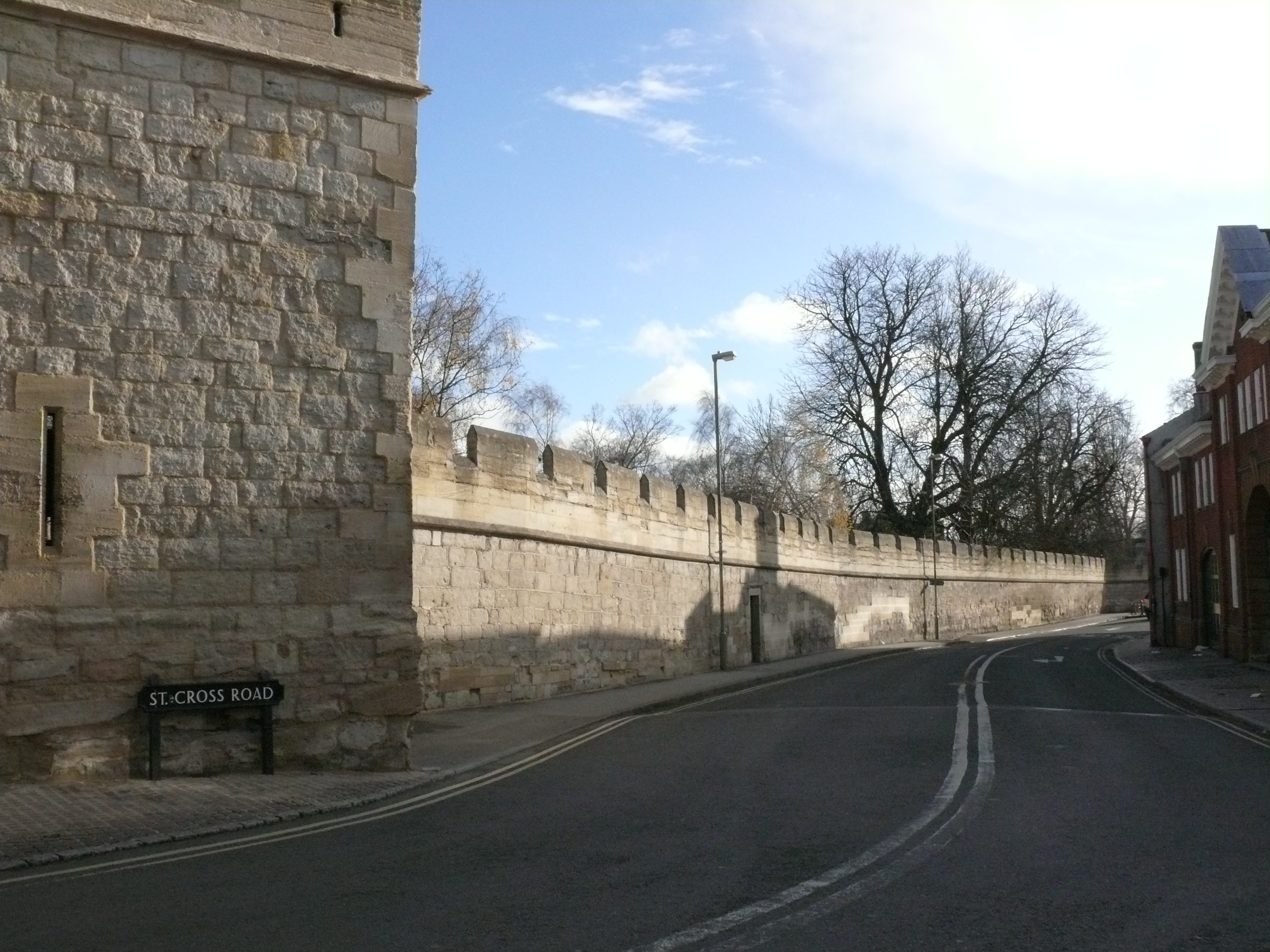
The junction of St Cross Road with Longwall Street, looking south.
