= Kenneth Norman Bell =

Kenneth Norman Bell (1884–1951) was a fellow of Balliol College, Oxford, from 1914 to his death in 1951. He was a major in the Horse Artillery in the First World War and was the tutor of Christopher Hill, Anthony Powell, and Graham Greene. He was also responsible for the establishment of Holywell Manor as Balliol student accommodation, to accomplish which he also created the Balliol Society.
