= Manor Road, Oxford =

Road in central Oxford, England

Coordinates: 51.7569°N 1.2470°W

Holywell Manor on Manor Road, at the junction with St Cross Road

Houses on Manor Road, at the junction with Manor Place

Manor Road is a road in central Oxford, England. It is a no through road that links St Cross Road to the west with St Catherine's College, one of the newer Oxford colleges, to the east. The road crosses the Holywell Mill Stream.

The road is named after Holywell Manor, which was rebuilt by Merton College in 1516. A workhouse was located here between 1740 and 1769. During 1856–1929, there was a refuge and training house run by the Sisters of St John the Baptist here.

The Oxford University Faculty of Law and Bodleian Law Library are at the eastern end on the north side at the junction with St Cross Road. Holywell Manor (now an annexe of Balliol College since 1930), St Cross Church (now disused as a church and an archive for Balliol College), and Holywell Cemetery, are to the south at the western end. The Oxford University Air Squadron headquarters are on the north side. St Cross College has an annexe in Manor Place, a cul-de-sac off the south side of Manor Road.

The most famous former resident of Manor Road was the Oxford academic and author J. R. R. Tolkien, at No. 3, with his wife Edith and only daughter Priscilla from 1947 to 1950, having moved from 20 Northmoor Road in North Oxford. Tolkien typed out The Hobbit once and The Lord of the Rings twice in the attic here. The Tolkiens moved to 99 Holywell Street for more room.

== Gallery ==
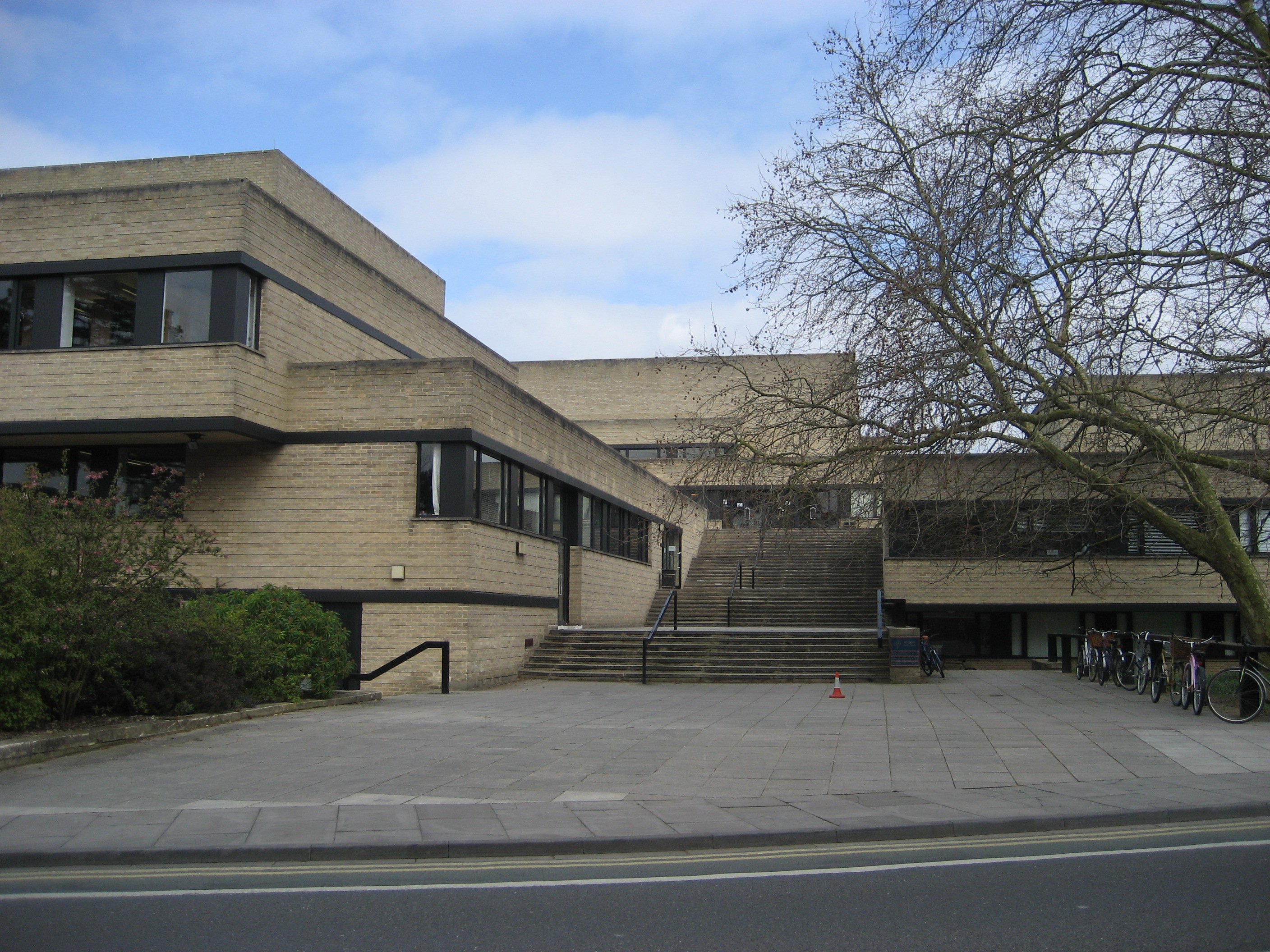
Stairs leading to the Bodleian Law Library on the corner of Manor Road and St Cross Road.

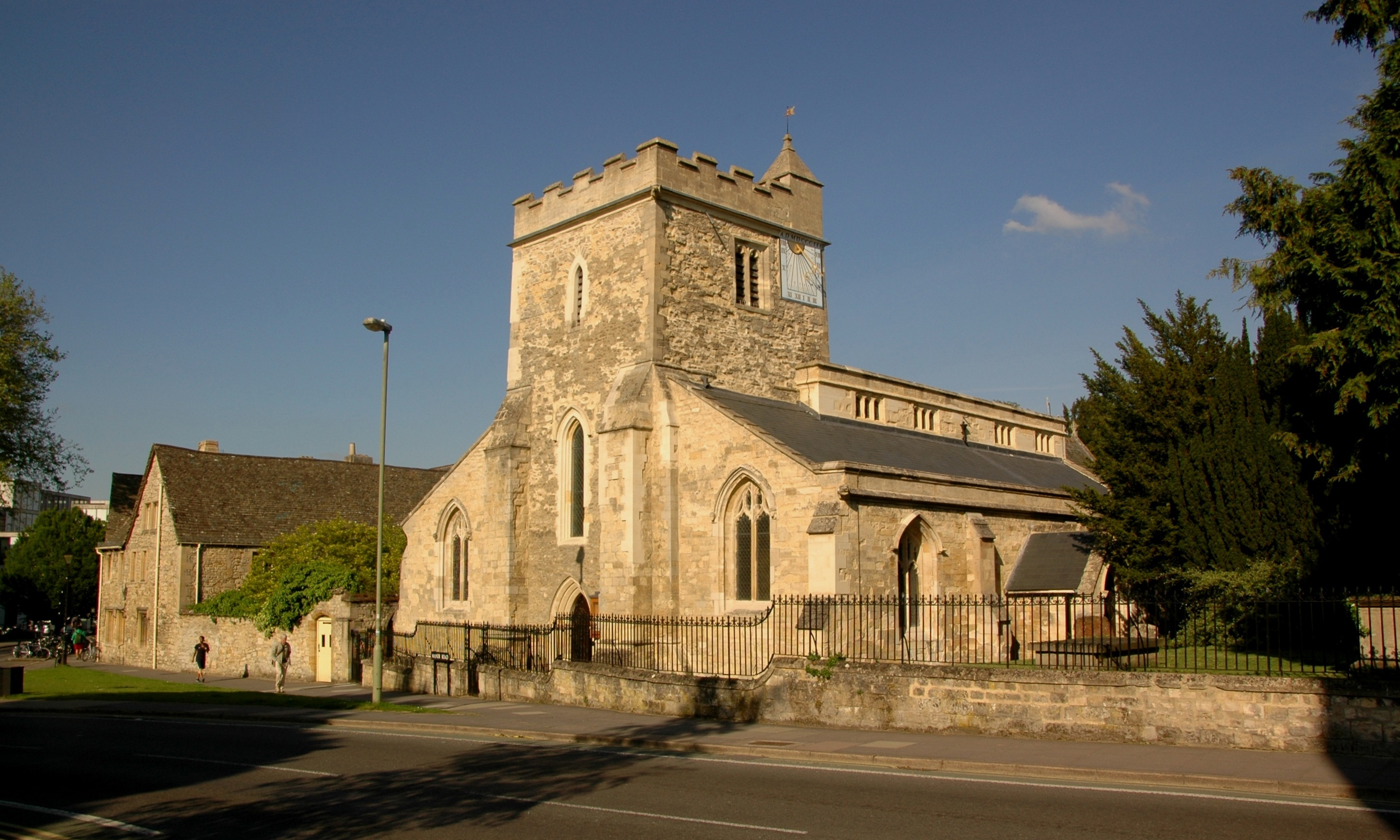
St Cross Church to the south of the junction with St Cross Road.

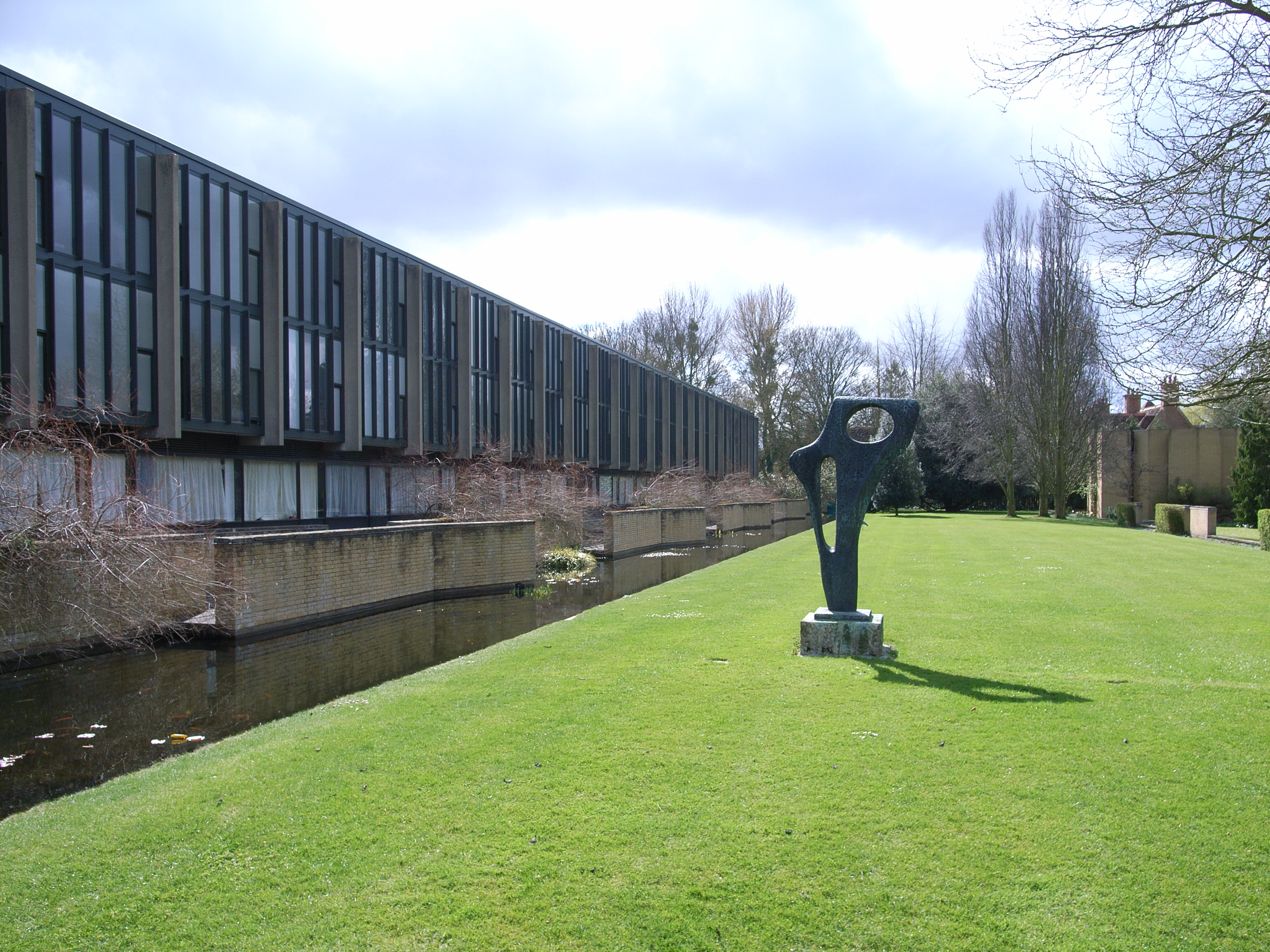
St Catherine's College with a Barbara Hepworth sculpture near the eastern end of Manor Road.
