= Lycée Michel Lucius =

Location
- Luxembourg City; Luxembourg
- 49°37′28.6968″N 06°06′50.022″E

Information
- Type: Secondary school
- Motto: Fordernd und fördern (Challenging and Supporting)
- Established: 1965
- Principal: Godart Tosca
- Grades: 7-1 A-Levels IGCSE; 7–13 Technique Générale; 7–13 Administrative et Commerciale; 7–11 Professions de Santé; 8–T3 Technicien; CLIJA
- Campus: Campus Limpertsberg
- Campus size: 3,801 m^{2} (40,910 sq ft)
- Website: www.lml.lu/about-us/?lang=en

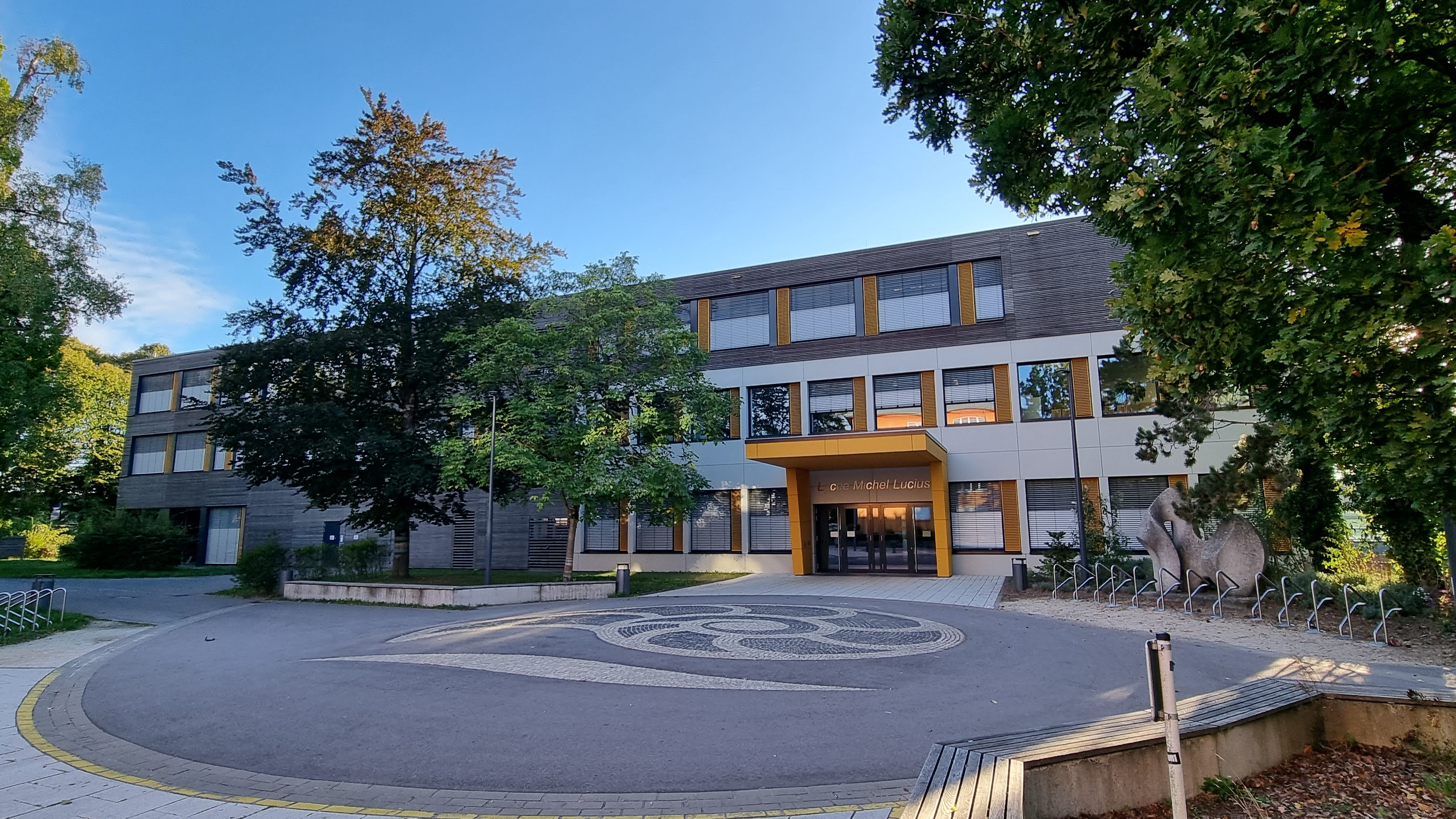
Luxembourg, Lycée Michel-Lucius (103).jpg

Lycée Michel Lucius LML (also known as Lycée Technique Michel Lucius, 1979–2013 and Le Collège d’Enseignement Moyen de Luxembourg, 1965–1979) is a high school in Luxembourg City, in Luxembourg. It is located on Campus Limpertsberg, along with several other educational institutions, including the University of Luxembourg, in the district of Limpertsberg, in the north-west of the city.

In July 2013, the school adopted the name Lycée Michel Lucius, reflecting a broader programme which now includes English-language A-Level/IGCSE studies. The revised school name was requested by Luxembourg's Ministry of Education. While the government acknowledges the new name, its official recognition has been delayed by older, conflicting legislation concerning the naming of secondary schools in Luxembourg opened prior to 2004. With the law of 23 December 2016, the school legally takes the name "Lycée Michel Lucius" with the start of the academic year 2017/2018 when it will also offer International Anglophone primary school education, key stage 1 and 2, years 1 through 6.

The school is named after Michel Lucius: a teacher, author, Doctor of Geology, and the founder of the Service Géologique de Luxembourg.

The school is served by three local buses (lines 2, 8, and 30), providing a direct connection with the surrounding Limpertsberg district, the city centre, the railway station, the suburbs of Strassen, Belair and Merl, and the southern suburbs of Bonnevoie and Hollerich.
