= Longwall Street =

Street in central Oxford, England

Coordinates: 51.7539°N 1.2485°W

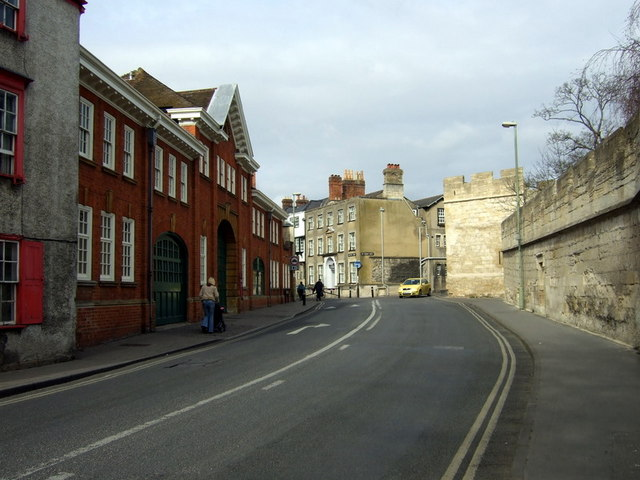
View north along Longwall Street

Location of Longwall Street within central Oxford

Longwall Street is a street in central Oxford, England. It runs for about 300 metres along the western flank of Magdalen College. A high, imposing 15th century stone wall separates the college from the street along its entire length. Behind part of the wall is the college's deer park. The street is actually named after the old Oxford city wall to the west of the street, now largely hidden in the grounds of New College.

Holywell Street and St Cross Road form a junction with the northern end of the street. The High forms a junction with the southern end.

== Morris Motors ==
In 1902 William Morris—later known as Lord Nuffield—established his early motor business on the site of disused livery stables in Longwall Street. At that stage, the enterprise was modest in scale and operated from adapted premises.

By 1910, purpose-built facilities had been erected on the same site for Morris Motors Limited. The new building provided approximately 4,400 square feet (410 m^{2}) of floor space, accommodation for up to 60 cars, and showroom windows facing the street. The structure, designed by the architects Tollit and Lee, was executed in red brick in a neo-Georgian style.

Demand soon exceeded the capacity of the Longwall Street premises. In 1913, Morris transferred production to a newly constructed factory at Cowley, to the south-east of Oxford.

A small display relating to Morris Motors is now exhibited in one of the windows of the former Longwall Street building.

== Gallery ==
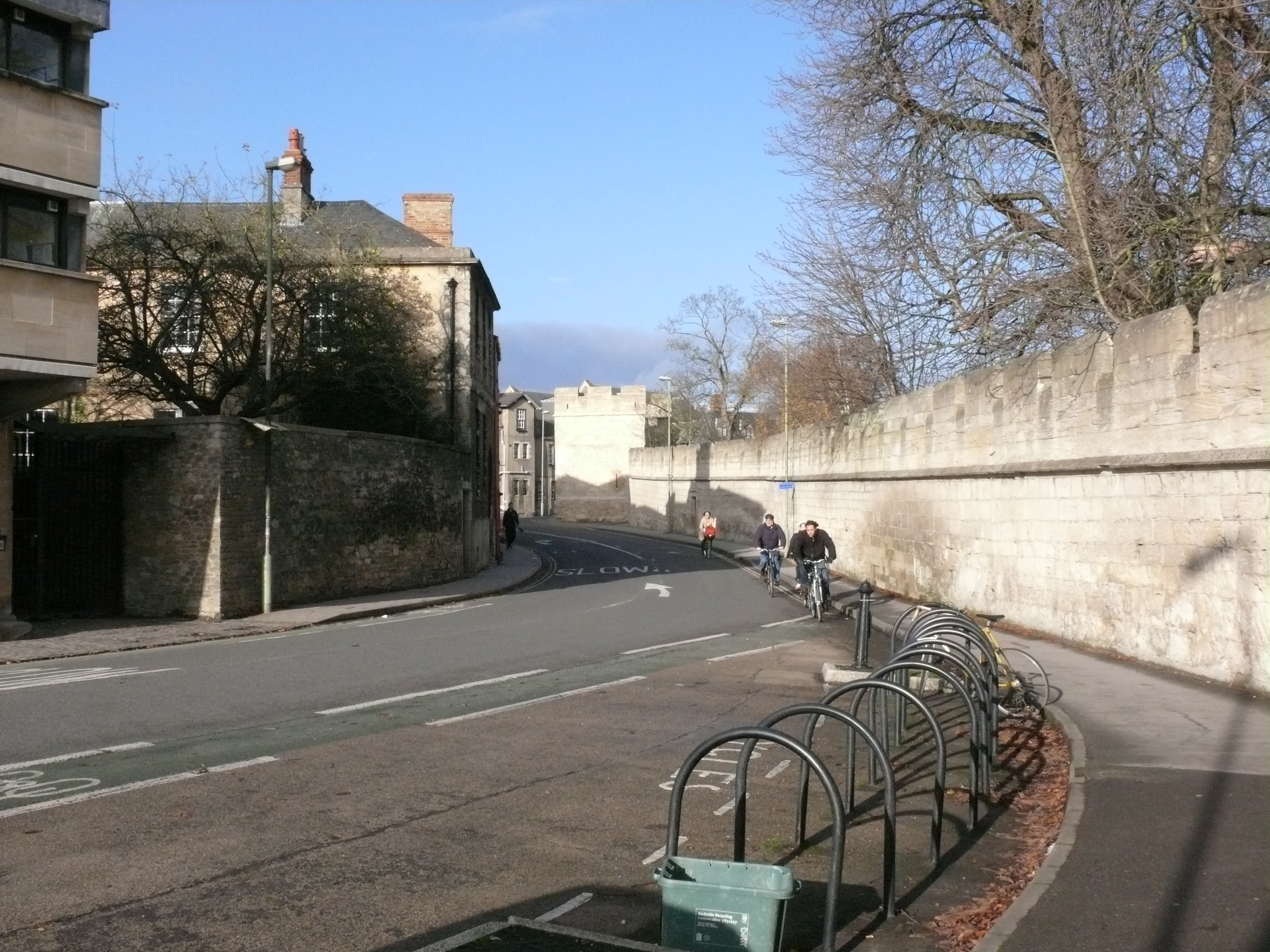
Longwall Street, Oxford

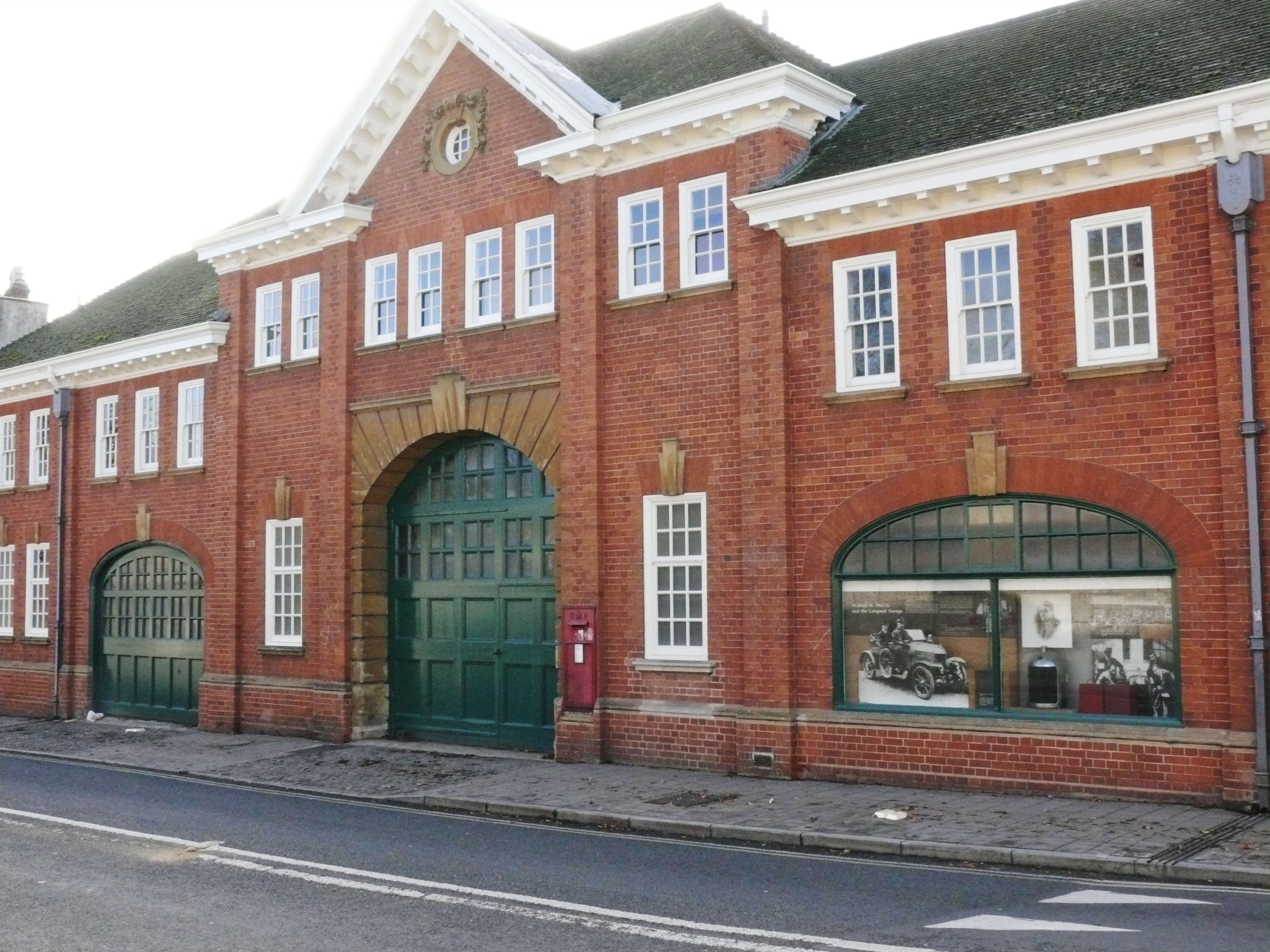
The former Morris Motors factory in Longwall Street

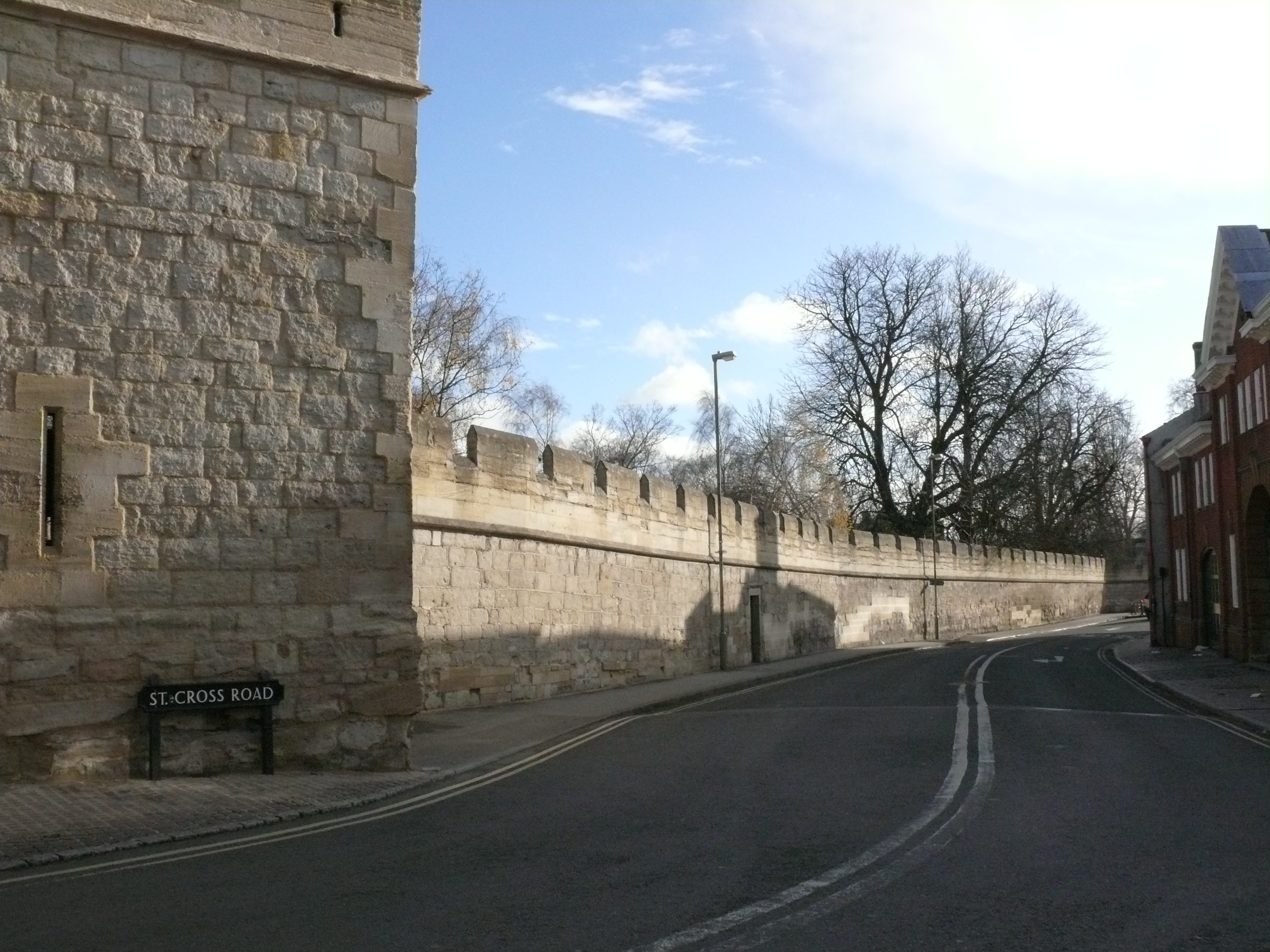
The junction with St Cross Road at the north end of Longwall Street, looking south

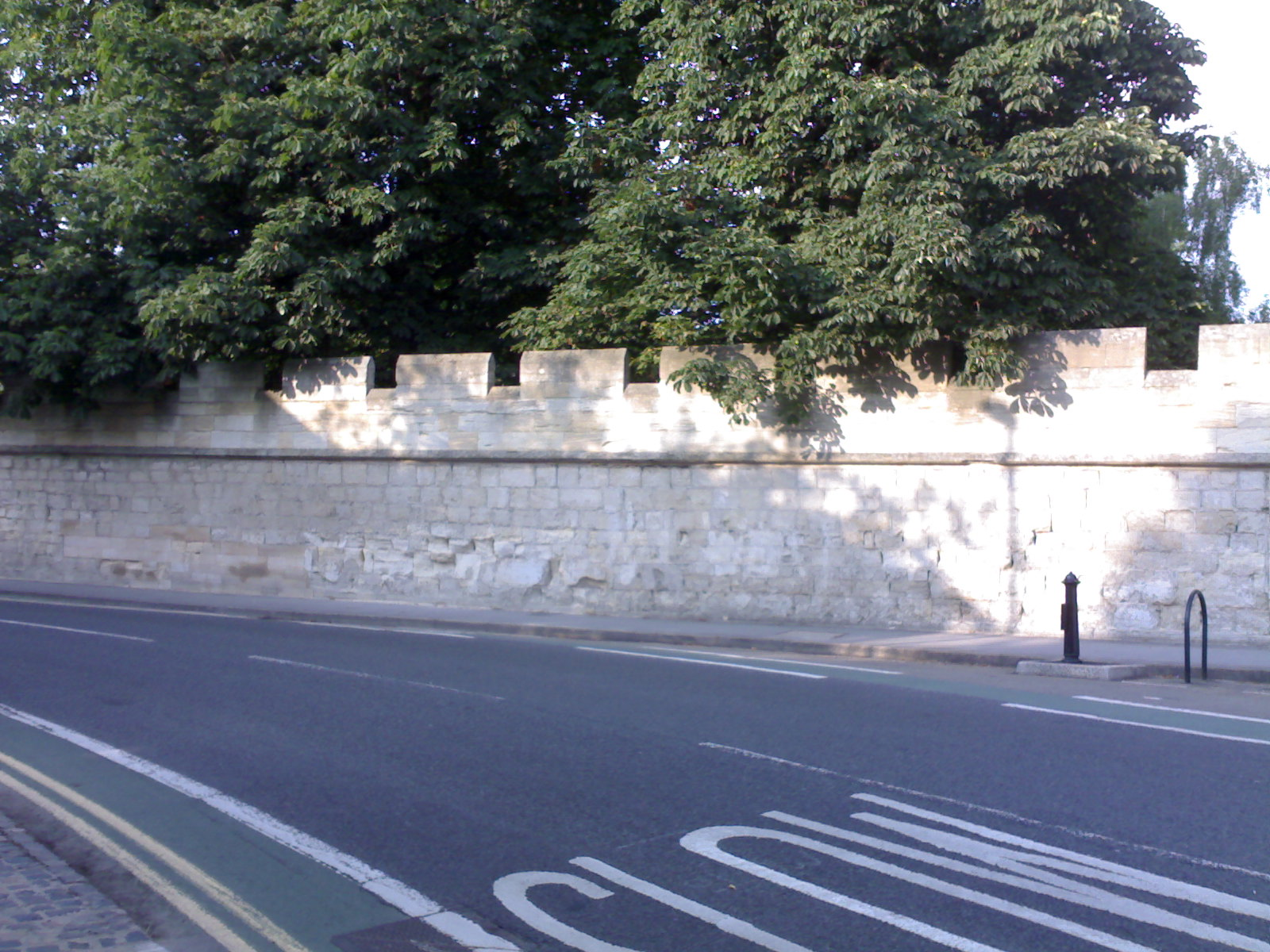
View of the Magdalen College wall in Longwall Street

== Sources ==
- Woolley, Liz (2010). "Industrial Architecture in Oxford, 1870 to 1914". Oxoniensia. LXXV. Oxfordshire Architectural and Historical Society: 94, 95. ISSN 0308-5562.
