= Holywell Manor, Oxford =

Historic building in central Oxford, England

Coordinates: 51°45′23″N 1°14′51″W

Holywell Manor.

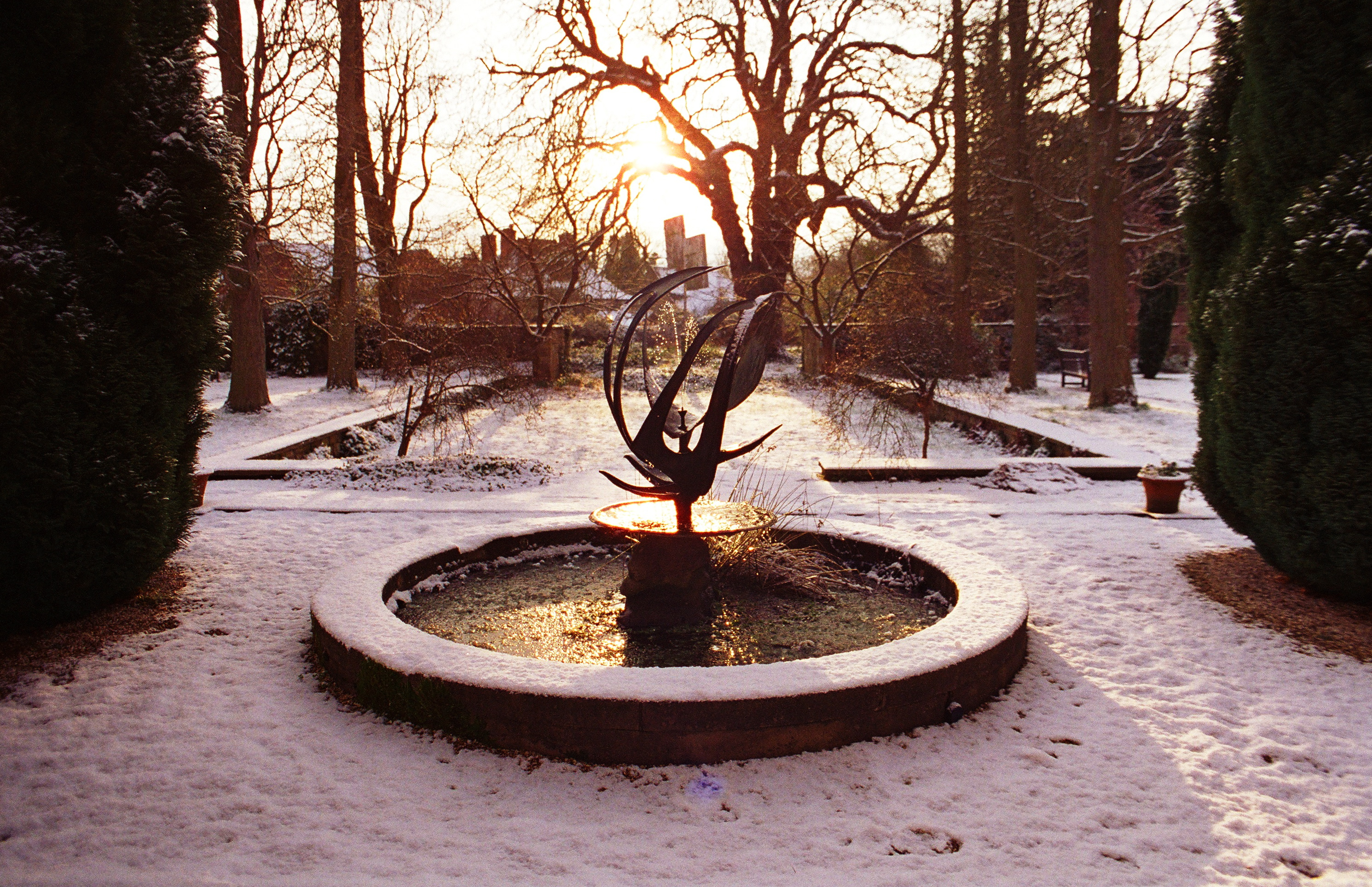
The Manor gardens.

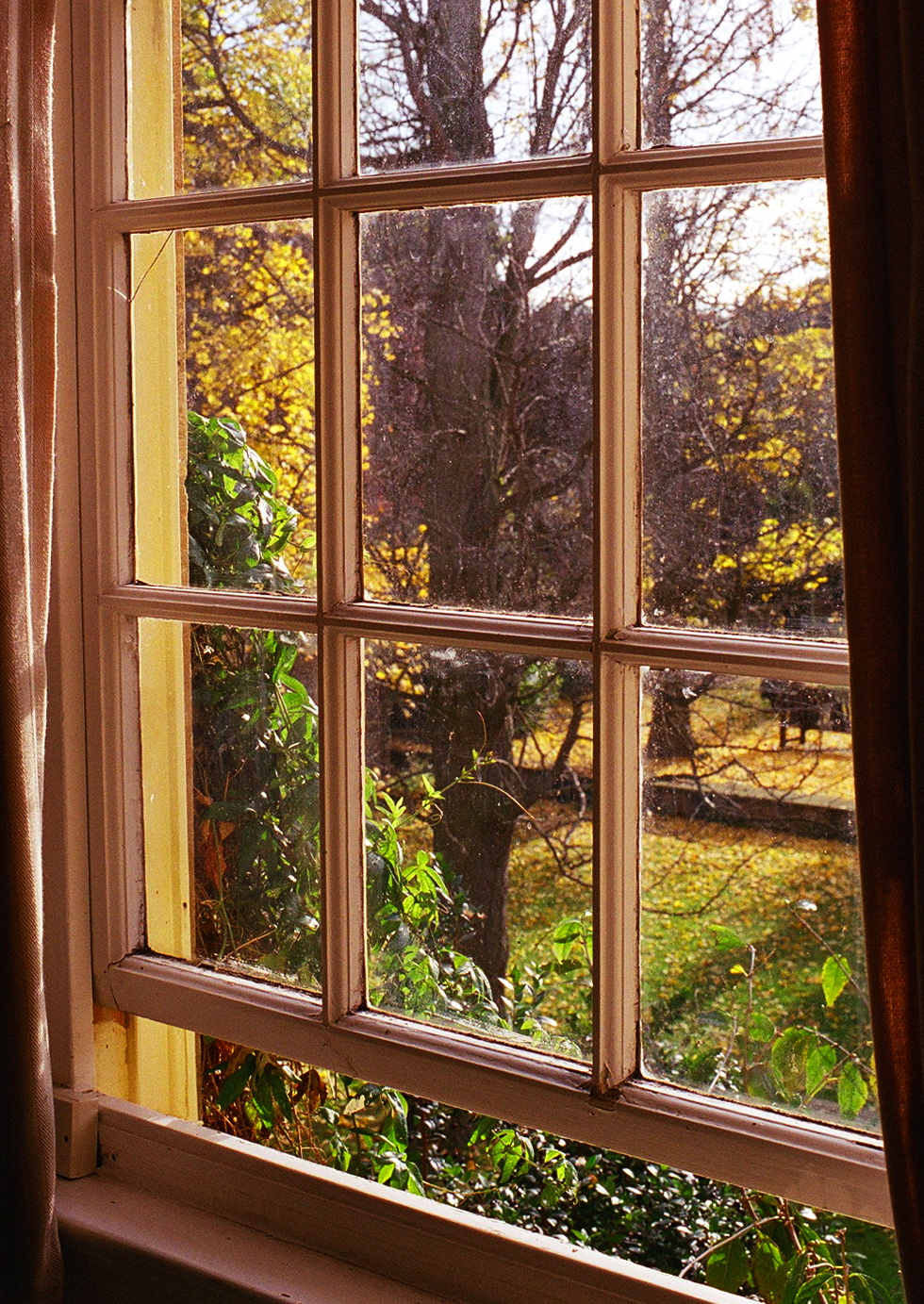
View through a window in the Manor of the gardens.

Holywell Manor is a historic building in central Oxford, England, in the parish of Holywell. It currently houses some of Balliol College's postgraduate student population. It is on the corner of Manor Road and St Cross Road, next to St Cross Church, which has become the Balliol College Historic Collections Centre.

== History ==
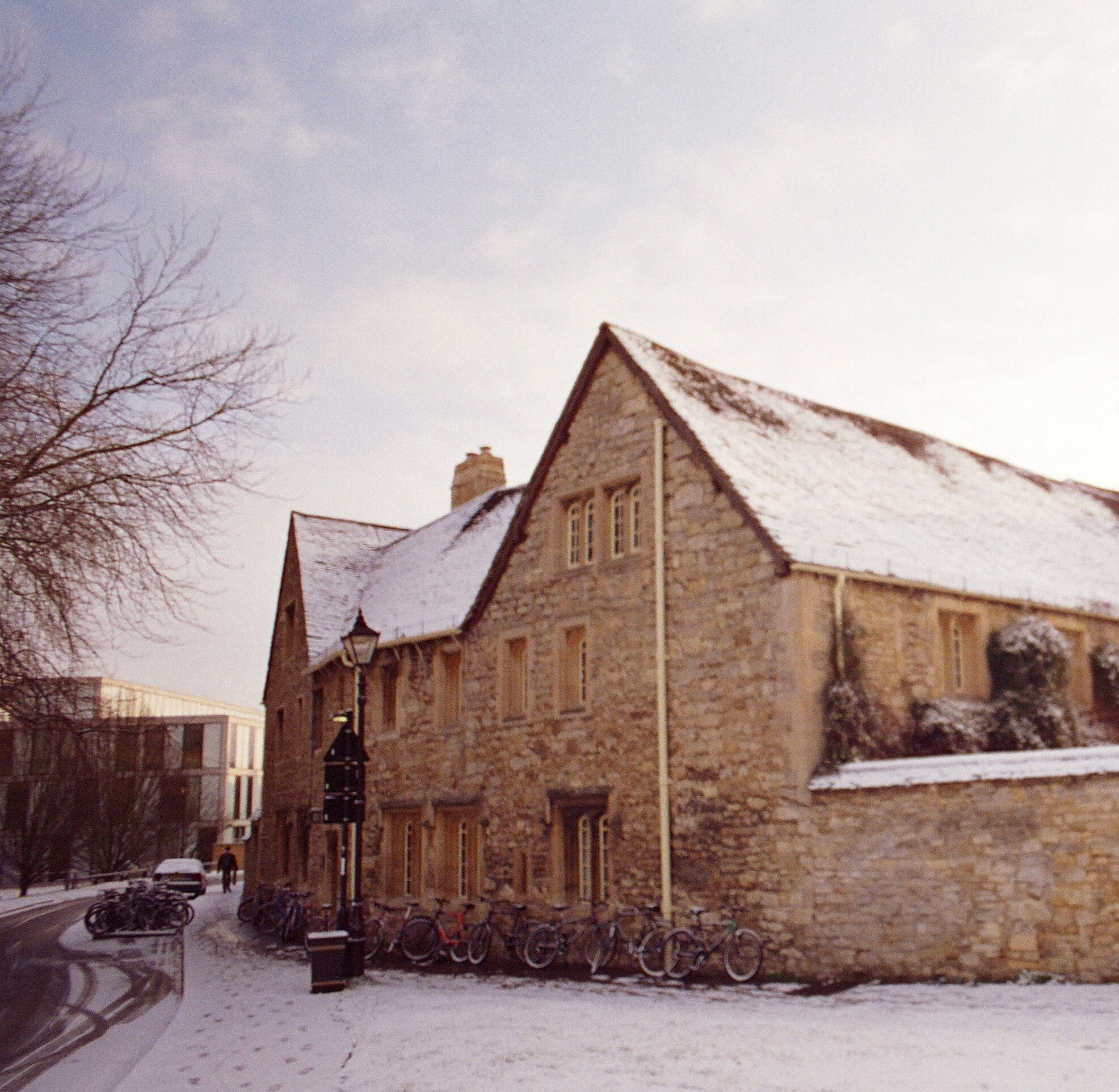
The Manor in the snow.

The manor was held by the rectors of the Church of St Peter-in-the-East in the 11th and 12th centuries. It passed to Merton College in 1294 and was rebuilt by the College in 1516. It was leased to Edward Napper by the College in 1531. When occupied by Napper's family, the house became a refuge for Roman Catholic priests. The building was enlarged during 1555–72 and Napper's family remained in residence until the 17th Century. The building was partially demolished in 1761 and divided into three parts in 1828.

Balliol College has had a presence in the area since the purchase by Benjamin Jowett, the Master, in the 1870s of the open area which is the Balliol sports ground 'The Master's Field'. On the edges of this, along Mansfield Road and St Cross Road, have been built Fellows houses, notably 'The King's Mound' in 1894.

The oldest surviving part of the site is the 16th-century farmhouse which now houses the 'Praefectus', i.e., the resident supervising Fellow. It was acquired by Balliol College in 1929, prior to which it had been a convent of the Community of St John Baptist, Clewer and a home for unmarried mothers (though it was deserted by 1929). The purchase was planned by Kenneth Norman Bell in order to provide accommodation for undergraduates and was funded by donations to the Balliol Society which he had founded expressly for this purpose.

The extensive extensions to the original manor were designed by the architect George Kennedy, an alumnus of the College. These include the road facing façade, the entrance courtyard and the grand Queen Anne style wings surrounding the distinctive two rows of Ginkgo trees planted by C. S. Orwin.

The Manor opened in 1932 and remained a hostel for Balliol's undergraduates until the 1960s, except for during World War II, when it was lent to St Hugh's College. It then became a mixed graduate community shared with St Anne's College's female graduates. Finally in 1984, after Balliol College had begun accepting women it took its current form as a residence just for Balliol's graduates. A supplementary graduate students accommodation block, built on the opposite corner of the road to the Manor on the 'Master's Field', was opened in 1966 and is officially the 'Martin Building' after Leslie Martin, and known jocularly as 'Holywell Minor'. In 1986 another block next to this was opened as the 'Dellal Building', named after Balliol Foundation fellow Jack Dellal. Between 2000 and 2008 a group of undergraduate resident Staircases have been developed along Jowett Walk. In 2019 the Dellal and Martin buildings were demolished to make way for new Balliol accommodation buildings that extend along Jowett Walk and St Cross Road, opposite Holywell Manor.

The building was significantly extended in 1993 with the construction of the James Fairfax Yard block off the manor's north wing, designed by Architects Design Partnership (ADP). A review of college services led to the decision to close the kitchens and dining room, Manor residents were to use the new facilities at the College Hall, from 2008. This reversed a tendency towards the Manor being regarded as a separate college; Balliol is in fact the ninth largest graduate college in the University by post-graduate student members. This allowed for internal improvements and facilities, notably an additional common space known as the 'cockpit' or 'lounge', and a gym, which are available for use by all College members.

== Art ==
Kenneth Norman Bell began an association between Holywell and the arts which still continues. What is now one of the Manor's computer rooms is decorated with murals depicting the tradition of the founding of the College painted by Gilbert Spencer, the brother of Stanley Spencer. In addition, the garden contains a fountain by Peter Lyon, Icarus by Raymond Petit and a wind sculpture by George Rickey.

== Notable residents ==
- Pauline Gregg
- Empress Masako of Japan stayed in Holywell Manor.
- Russell Meiggs
- George Napper
- Denis Noble

== Facilities ==
Holywell Manor has the following facilities:

- The "Megaron" Bar — This is unusual amongst college bars both for being student run and for operating on an honesty basis.
- The MCR — The common room is furnished with seating, is stocked with newspapers and magazines, and has Wi-Fi access.
- The laundry room
- TV Room
- Gym
- Music practice rooms — previously the "Cockpit" dining hall.

== See also ==
- St Cross Church, Oxford
