= Charles Ryle Fay =

British economic historian

Charles Ryle Fay (13 January 1884 – 19 November 1961) was a noted British economic historian. He was a strong advocate of co-operation, workers' rights and women's rights.

He was educated at Merchant Taylors' Boys' School, Crosby and King's College, Cambridge, where he was a student alongside John Maynard Keynes. The two remained friends until Keynes' death. One of his students, Austin Robinson, described him as an "exuberant, argumentative, devoted pupil of Marshall, but almost wholly innocent of any understanding of economic theory."

Fay's papers are held at the Public Record Office of Northern Ireland.

== Works ==
- Co-operation at home and abroad: a description and analysis, 1908
- Copartnership in industry, 1913
- Life and labour in the nineteenth century; being the substance of lectures delivered at Cambridge University in the year 1919 to students of economics, among whom were officers of the Royal Navy and students from the Army of the United States, 1920
- Great Britain from Adam Smith to the present day; an economic and social survey, 1928
- Imperial economy and its place in the formation of economic doctrine, 1600-1932, 1934
- English economic history, mainly since 1700, Cambridge: Heffer, 1940
- The corn laws and social England, 1951
- Huskisson and his age, 1951
- Palace of industry, 1851; a study of the Great Exhibition and its fruits, 1951
- Round about industrial Britain, 1830-1860, Toronto: University of Toronto Press, 1952
- Adam Smith and the Scotland of his day, 1956
- Life and labour in Newfoundland, 1956
- The world of Adam Smith. Cambridge: W. Heffer & Sons, Ltd. 1960 – via Internet Archive.
