= St Cross Church, Oxford =

Coordinates: 51°45′22.5″N 1°14′52.5″W

St Cross Church
- Church of St Cross in Holywell
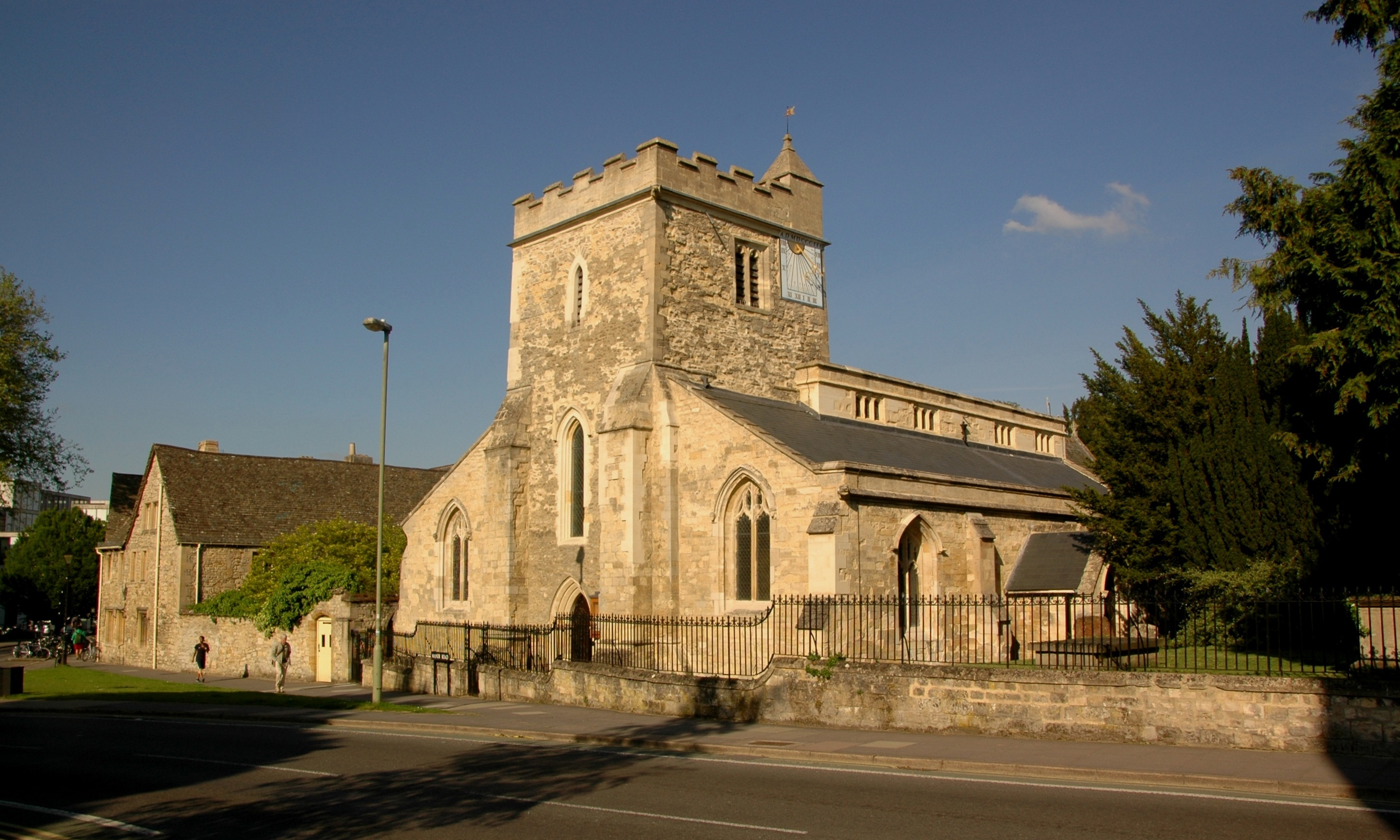
- St Cross church from the south-west, with Holywell Manor behind it on the left.
- St Cross Church
- OS grid reference: SP 52014 06657
- Location: Oxford
- Country: England
- Denomination: Church of England

History
- Status: Balliol College's historic collections centre (previously parish church)
- Founded: 9th century

Architecture
- Functional status: Preserved
- Heritage designation: Grade I listed (building); Grade II listed (wall)
- Closed: Closed in 2008; not deconsecrated

Administration
- Diocese: Oxford (formerly)
- Parish: Holywell (transferred to University Church of St Mary the Virgin)

St Cross Church is a former parish church, now a historic collections centre, in Oxford, England, to the northeast of the centre of the city. The church is on St Cross Road at the junction with Manor Road, just south of Holywell Manor. Also close by is Holywell Cemetery.

== Church history ==
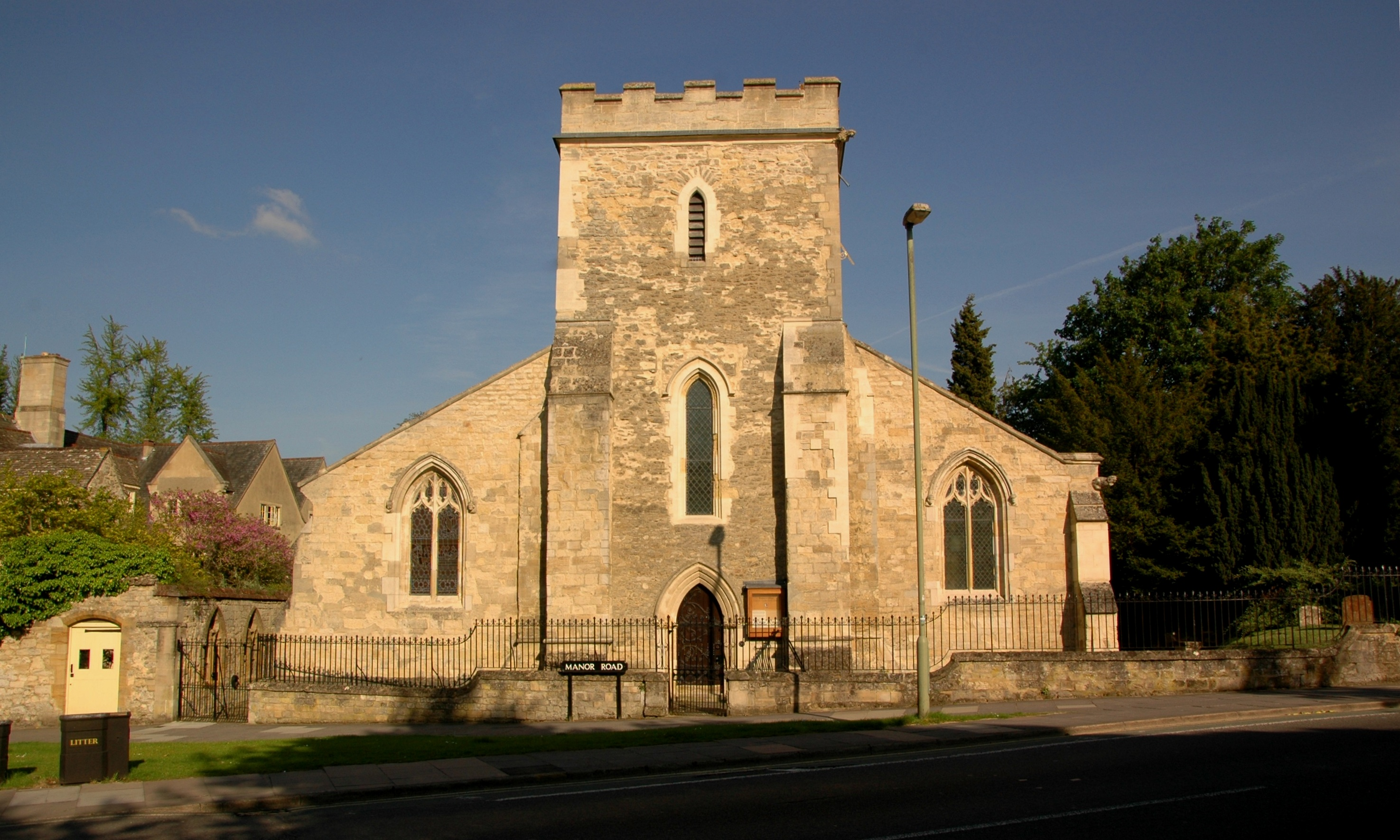
St Cross's west front, showing the medieval tower flanked by largely 19th-century aisles.

St Cross Church was once a dependent chapelry of St Peter-in-the-East on Queen's Lane, north of the High Street in central Oxford. The precise date of the church's foundation is not known, but it has been suggested that St Cross was first built around AD 890 by St Grimwald. However, archaeological investigations in 2009 did not show evidence of a pre-Norman church.

The chancel arch is late 11th or early 12th century and the nave was built in about 1160. The tower and aisles were added in the 13th century, the upper stage of the tower was rebuilt in 1464 and the north arcade and aisle were rebuilt in the middle of the 15th century. A few of the windows are original Perpendicular Gothic; the remainder are Victorian Gothic Revival.

The aisles were rebuilt again in the 19th century — the north (except for its west end) in 1839 and the south in 1843 — the latter to designs by the architect J. M. Derick. In 1876 the north aisle was extended by the addition of an organ chamber and vestry designed by Henry James Tollit. In 1893 the church was restored under the direction of E. P. Warren, including the addition of new clerestory windows. The tower was repaired in 1908.

George Edmund Street designed the west window of the north aisle, which was made in 1855. However, since then the window has been moved and, in Sir Nikolaus Pevsner's opinion, "garbled". Hardman & Co. made the east window of the chancel in 1874. St Cross church is a Grade I listed building.

In recent years services were held once weekly until 12 October 2008, when the church was closed.

Holywell Cemetery is behind the church and includes the graves of many notable people. They include the composer Sir John Stainer (1840–1901) who, while he was Professor of Music at Magdalen College, was church warden at St Cross. The clockmaker John Knibb (1650–1722), who was Mayor of Oxford in 1698 and 1710, is buried in St Cross with his widow and four of their daughters as is Sir John Snell, founder of the Snell Exhibition. The author Charles Williams, his wife Florence and son Michael are buried at Holywell.

== Historic Collections Centre ==
St Cross had a falling attendance for many years, and in February 2008 its Parochial Church Council decided unanimously to allow Balliol College to develop a purpose-built repository and research facility for the College's special collections and their users in the church.

After the closure of the church in 2008, building work was undertaken to convert the building for use as an Historic Collections Centre for Balliol College. The church has not been deconsecrated; under the terms of the College's 999-year lease on the building, the chancel is maintained for occasional services. Some fittings and fixtures of the church have been removed, including the organ, which was relocated to a church in Ireland. Memorials remain in or as near as possible to their pre-2008 position. The font was relocated, with permission, from near the south door to the north side of the chancel step, to allow full use of the south aisle for one of the repository units. The bells remain in situ in the tower, but unringable, after Oxford City Council refused permission for their removal. The work was completed at an estimated cost of £3.3 million and opened in 2011.

In May 2008, the Shirley Foundation contributed £1m towards Balliol College's Historic Collections Centre to be housed in St Cross Church. This contains: the College's own administrative records; extensive personal papers of former Masters, Fellows and students; manuscript books, mostly from the College's medieval library; early printed books including incunabula; and other special items previously located separately, allowing expansion of the College Library's services on the main site in Broad Street. One manuscript book (Balliol MS 317) dates from circa 1170 and has been held by the College since 1276. Many of the medieval books survive from the College's contemporary library, and the bulk of the collection is not formed of later antiquarian acquisitions as held by more recent foundations, although it is as large as some of these. This is the third library at Oxford University to be converted from a church, the others being All Saints on the High Street (Lincoln College) and St Peter-in-the-East, Queen's Lane (St Edmund Hall). A further two libraries were converted from convent chapels, those of the Society of the Holy and Undivided Trinity (St Antony's) and the Society of the Holy Child Jesus (Linacre). The Centre has modern research facilities.

As a central Oxford church it has other Balliol College connections. John Snell, the benefactor of the post graduate scholarships connecting the College and Glasgow University, was buried in the Church in 1679. In its cemetery are buried the Masters James Leigh Strachan-Davidson (died in office 1916) and Arthur Lionel Smith (died in office 1924).

== In fiction ==
- The marriage of Dorothy L. Sayers' fictional detective Lord Peter Wimsey to Harriet Vane took place in the church on 8 October 1935 in the novel Busman's Honeymoon.

== See also ==
- St Cross College, Oxford
