= Christoph Bode =

German scholar

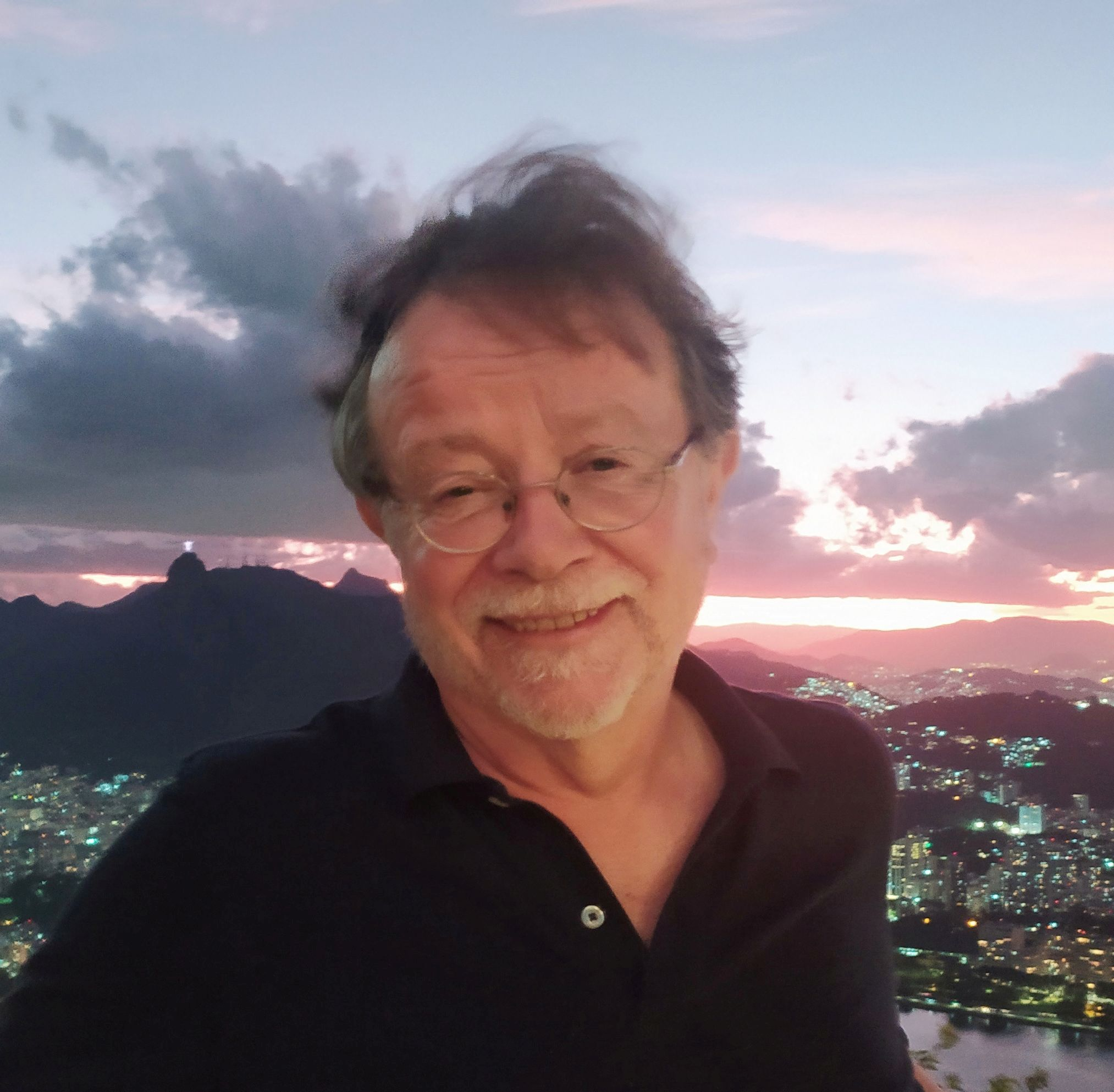
Christoph Bode (2022)

Christoph Bode (born May 13, 1952, in Siegen/North Rhine-Westphalia) is a literary scholar. His fields are British and American literature, comparative literature, literary theory, poetics, and travel writing, but he is mainly known as a romanticist and a narratologist. He was full professor and chair of Modern English Literature in the Department of English and American Studies at Ludwig-Maximilians-Universität München until his retirement in March 2018.

== Early life and education ==
Bode is the second child of the headmaster of a private language school and university lecturer (Anglistik und Amerikanistik) Dr. Adolf Bode and his wife Ute Bode (born Kuß). Bode was educated in his home town of Siegen (1959–1971), before reading English and American literature, geography, and philosophy/pedagogy at Philipps-Universität Marburg, Germany, and University College Cardiff (1971–1976). After his graduation from Marburg in 1976 (state examination), Bode received his Ph.D. from the same university in 1978 (English and American literature, with philosophy/pedagogy as minor subject). This was followed by Bode's alternative service as conscientious objector (1978–1980).

== Career in academia ==
From 1977 to 1986, Bode was an assistant professor and, from 1986 to 1992, associate professor at Christian-Albrechts-Universität zu Kiel, Germany. In 1989/90 he temporarily filled the position as a professor of English and American literature at Justus Liebig University Giessen, Germany. In 1992, he was made professor of English and American literature at Otto-Friedrich-Universität Bamberg, and in 1997 he was visiting professor at the University of California, Los Angeles. In 2001, Bode accepted the offer of a chair of English literature from the Ludwig-Maximilians-Universität München, after rejecting a parallel offer from Ruprecht Karl University of Heidelberg. Since then, Bode was visiting professor at the University of California, Berkeley (2012), at Tsinghua University, Beijing and at the University of Sichuan, Chengdu (both in 2015). In 2016, he was Mercator Fellow at Friedrich Schiller University Jena, and after his retirement in 2018 Erasmus Scholar at the Jagiellonian University, Krakow and distinguished guest at the Chinese University, Hong Kong in 2019.

=== Focus in research and teaching ===
Bode is a specialist in British, European, and American Romanticism and Modernist literature. With a background in philosophy and aesthetics (Ästhetik der Ambiguität, 1988), he is also a narratologist (The Novel, 2011; European Research Council project "Narrating Futures") and an expert in poetics. Other facets of his research include literary theory and travel writing. Bode was President of the Gesellschaft für Englische Romantik (Society for English Romanticism) 2001 through 2013, since then he has served as Vice-President for International Relations.

== Memberships ==
Bode is a member of about a dozen learned societies and associations, among them

- Deutscher Anglistikverband (advisory board 1998-2002)
- North American Society for the Study of Romanticism (NASSR)
- British Association for Romantic Studies (BARS)
- Academia Europaea

== Prizes, awards, fellowships ==
- 2007 Christensen Fellowship, University of Oxford (Visiting Fellow of St Catherine's College)
- 2007 Corresponding Fellow, English Association, UK
- 2007/08 Sabbatical year funded by the Deutsche Forschungsgemeinschaft (DFG) (German Research Foundation) for research on the discursive construction of identity in British Romanticism
- 2008/09 Sabbatical year funded by the Exzellenzinitiative des Bundes for research on the History and Theory of British Travel Writing
- 2009-12 Advanced Investigator Grant of the European Research Council (ERC): "Narrating Futures" project (900.000 €). Bode was the first English Literature scholar in Europe to receive such a grant and the first Humanities scholar in Germany
- 2010 Fellow of the Center for Advanced Studies (CAS) at LMU Munich
- 2011 Fellow of the Academia Europaea
- 2013 Order of Merit of the Federal Republic of Germany (Merit Cross on Ribbon)
- 2015 Walker Ames Lecture Award of the University of Washington, Seattle
- 2015 High-End Foreign Experts Program of the People's Republic of China
- 2015 Research Fellowship of St Catherine's College, University of Oxford

== Referee and advisory boards ==
Bode serves on ca. 15 advisory boards, among them those of the European Research Council, Deutsche Forschungsgemeinschaft, Alexander von Humboldt-Stiftung, Volkswagenstiftung, Max Weber Stiftung, Fritz Thyssen Stiftung, Österreichische Akademie der Wissenschaften, Schweizer Nationalfonds zur Förderung der wissenschaftlichen Forschung, Studienstiftung des deutschen Volkes, Fulbright Commission, Cusanus-Werk and European Romantic Review. He also reviews for Studies in Romanticism, Literature Compass, publishers Routledge and Edinburgh University Press as well as the Leverhulme Trust. He also worked as a reviewer for the Princeton Institute for Advanced Studies.

== Publications ==
=== Monographs ===
Bode has published 17 monographs, among them

- Aldous Huxley, „Brave New World“, Wilhelm Fink Verlag, München 1985. (Text und Geschichte: Modellanalysen zur englischen und amerikanischen Literatur, vol. 13; utb 1312); 2nd improved edition 1993.
- Ästhetik der Ambiguität: Zu Funktion und Bedeutung von Mehrdeutigkeit in der Literatur der Moderne, Max Niemeyer Verlag, Tübingen 1988. (Konzepte der Sprach- und Literaturwissenschaft, vol. 4).
- Der Roman: Eine Einführung, Francke, Tübingen 2005; 2nd extended edition 2011; engl. edition "The Novel: An Introduction", Wiley-Blackwell, Oxford/Malden, MA, 2011.
- Selbst-Begründungen: Diskursive Konstruktion von Identität in der britischen Romantik 1: Subjektive Identität, Wissenschaftlicher Verlag Trier, Trier 2008.
- Fremd-Erfahrungen: Diskursive Konstruktion von Identität in der britischen Romantik 2: Identität auf Reisen, Wissenschaftlicher Verlag Trier, Trier, 2009.
- Future Narratives: Theory, Poetics, and Media-Historical Moment (together with Rainer Dietrich), Berlin/New York: Walter de Gruyter, 2013.
- Vom Innehalten: Anhand einiger Gedichte der englischen Romantik, Format, Gera/Jena, 2017.

=== Editor and Co-Editor ===
Bode has co-edited 13 collections, among them

- Hugo Keiper and Richard J. Utz, Nominalism and Literary Discourse: New Perspectives, Amsterdam/Atlanta: Rodopi, 1997. (Critical Studies, Vol. 10).
- Ulrich Broich, Die Zwanziger Jahre in Großbritannien: Literatur und Gesellschaft einer spannungsreichen Dekade, Tübingen: Gunter Narr Verlag, 1998.
- Sebastian Domsch, British and European Romanticisms: Selected Papers from the Munich Conference of the German Society for English Romanticism, Trier: Wissenschaftlicher Verlag Trier, 2007.
- (sole editor) Romanticism and the Forms of Discontent, Wissenschaftlicher Verlag Trier, Trier, 2017.
- With Michael O’Sullivan, Eli Park Sorensen and Lukas Schepp, East-West Dialogues: The Transferability of Concepts in the Humanities, Peter Lang, Berlin/Bern/Bruxelles etc., 2020.

=== Series Editor ===
- As president of the Gesellschaft für englische Romantik, Bode has been co-editor of the series "Studien zur englischen Romantik" with Die Blaue Eule publishers, as of 2005 with WVT Trier.
- Co-editor since 2007, Münchener Universitätsschriften: Texte und Untersuchungen zur Englischen Philologie, Frankfurt/Main, Peter Lang Verlag (since 2016 Munich Studies in English = MUSE).
- Co-editor, Literatur - Kultur - Theorie, Würzburg, Ergon Verlag (since 2007).
- Narrating Futures, a five-volume book series, de Gruyter, Berlin/New York, 2013. (Vol. 1: Christoph Bode, Rainer Dietrich: Future Narratives: Theory, Poetics, and Media-Historical Moment; vol. 2: Felicitas Meifert: Playing the Text, Performing the Future: Future Narratives in Print and Digiture; vol. 3: Sabine Schenk: Running and Clicking: Future Narratives in Film; vol. 4: Sebastian Domsch: Storyplaying: Agency and Narrative in Video Games; vol. 5: Kathleen Singles: Alternate History: Playing with Contingency and Necessity).

=== Publications ===
Bode has published well over 70 articles, among them

- Beyond/Around/Into One's Own: Reiseliteratur als Paradigma von Welt-Erfahrung, Poetica 26: 1–2 (1994), 70–87.
- Azores High, Iceland Low: The Location and Dynamics of Shakespeare's Meaning and Value, Historicizing/Contemporizing Shakespeare: Essays in Honour of Rudolf Böhm, eds. Christoph Bode, Wolfgang Klooß, Trier: WVT, 2000, 25–51.
- The Subject of Beachy Head, Charlotte Smith, British Romanticism, ed. Jacqueline Labbe, Pickering & Chatto, London, 2008, 57–69.
- Coleridge and Philosophy, The Oxford Handbook of Samuel Taylor Coleridge, ed. Frederick Burwick, Oxford University Press, Oxford, 2009, 588–619.
- Absolut Jena. Romanticism and Philosophy: Thinking with Literature, eds. Sophie Laniel-Musitelli, Thomas Constantinesco, Routledge, London/New York, 2015, 19–39.
- A Model of Models? Reconceptualizing European Romanticisms and the Form(s) of Historicity, Romantik erkennen – Modelle finden, eds. Sandra Kerschbaumer, Stefan Matuschek, Schöningh, Paderborn, 2019, 131–143.
- German Romanticism and the Sublime, The Cambridge Companion to the Romantic Sublime, ed. Cian Duffy, Cambridge University Press, Cambridge, 2023, 69–80.

=== Reviews ===
Bode has written over 50 reviews, encyclopedia articles and handbook entries, mainly on romanticism and literary theory.
