= St Catherine's College, Oxford =

College of the University of Oxford

St Catherine's College
- University of Oxford
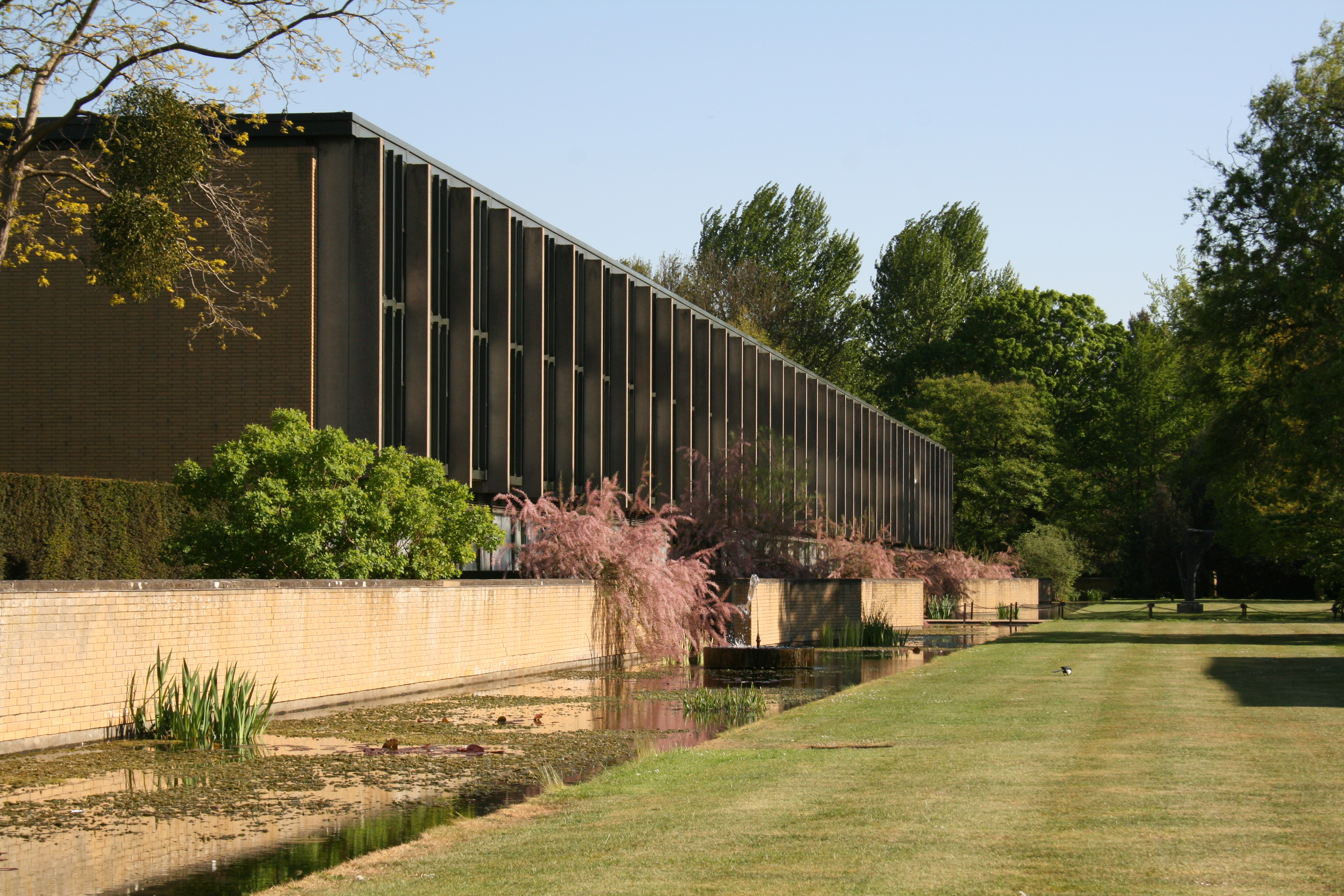

- Arms: Sable a saltire ermine between four catherine wheels or.
- Location: Manor Road
- Coordinates: 51.757066°N 1.245098°W
- Latin name: Collegium Sanctae Catherinae
- Nickname: St Catz, Catz
- Motto: Nova et Vetera (The New and the Old)
- Established: 1868 and 1962
- Named after: Catherine of Alexandria
- Former names: Delegacy of Unattached Students, Delegacy of Non-Collegiate Students, St Catharine's Club, St Catherine's Society
- Architect: Arne Jacobsen
- Sister college: Robinson College, Cambridge
- Master: Jude Kelly
- Undergraduates: 494 (November 2024)
- Postgraduates: 337 (November 2024)
- Endowment: £104 million (2022)
- Website: www.stcatz.ox.ac.uk
- JCR: jcr.stcatz.ox.ac.uk//
- MCR: mcr.stcatz.ox.ac.uk//

Map
- Location within Oxford city centre

St Catherine's College (colloquially called St Catz or Catz) is one of the constituent colleges of the University of Oxford. The college developed from the St Catherine's Society; it was granted full status as a college in 1962, after a campaign by the historian Alan Bullock, who became the first master of the college, and later vice-chancellor of the university. In 1974, it was one of the first men's colleges to admit women. As of November 2024, it has 494 undergraduate students and 337 graduate students, making it one of the largest colleges in Oxbridge.

Designed by Danish architect Arne Jacobsen, the college was built in an egalitarian architectural style that maximises the number of rooms for academically qualified students who lack the financial resources to study at Oxford. Though, in modern times the college has ceased being distinctly egalitarian, its students coming from a variety of backgrounds, with 27.7% of undergraduates being privately educated, exceeding centuries-old colleges such as St. Edmund Hall (24.8%), Hertford College (23%), Brasenose College (19.3%), and more modern colleges such as Mansfield College (13.8%).

In September 2023, access to areas of the college was restricted due to safety concerns around the use of reinforced autoclaved aerated concrete (RAAC).

Its current Master is Jude Kelly, a British theatre director and former Artistic Director of the Southbank Centre in London.

== History ==
St Catherine's College, Oxford traces its origins to 1868. In its first iteration, it was established as a delegacy for Scholares nulli Collegio vel Aulae ascripti ('Scholars enrolled in no college or hall'), by university statute on 11 June 1868. This delegacy, informally known as the "Delegacy for Unattached Students", was created in response to the recommendation of a Royal Commission in 1850, that the university be open to a "larger and poorer" sector of the population. The delegacy, by allowing students to enrol without belonging to a college, would enable less affluent men to gain an Oxford education without the costs of college membership.

The delegacy appointed two of its stipendiaries, George Kitchin and George S. Ward, to be known as "Censors", to oversee the education and welfare of the students. Nineteen students matriculated in October 1868 as Scholares nulli Collegio ascripti and were joined throughout the year by another forty, bringing the total number in the first year to 59. Growing quickly, by 1872 the delegacy had admitted 330 students. By 1914, more than 4,000 men had matriculated as non-collegiate students. In 1884, the delegacy was renamed the "Delegacy for Non-Collegiate Students".

In its first days, a room in the university's Old Clarendon Building was allocated for the operations of the delegacy, and with gifts of books from several donors, a library for the unattached students was installed there. These accommodations soon proved inadequate and in 1888, the delegacy was moved to a building in High Street next to the Examination Schools. Here the non-collegiate students, as they were known after 1884, had a library in its own dedicated space and two lecture halls. There was an administration office and rooms for the Censors and tutors. Designed by T. G. Jackson, this building is now the Ruskin School of Art. In 1936, the delegacy moved again, from its outgrown High Street premises to the limestone buildings on St Aldates, south of Christ Church, Oxford which are now part of the Oxford University's Faculty of Music.

By 1956, the society had developed many of the characteristics of an Oxford college and the delegates decided to formalise this change in status by obtaining approval to turn it into a fully residential college within the University of Oxford. After acquiring eight acres (three hectares) from Merton College, Oxford on part of Holywell Great Meadow for £57,690, monies were sought from the University Grants Committee who also agreed to supply £250,000 towards the building, and additional funds up to £400,000 for all facilities. By 1960, Alan Bullock raised a further £1,000,000 with assistance from two industrialists, Alan Wilson (whom he met by chance on the RMS Queen Mary) and Sir Hugh Beaver. After a total expenditure of £2.5 million, the college opened in 1962. In 1974, St Catherine's was one of the first men's colleges to admit women as full members, the others being Brasenose, Jesus College, Hertford and Wadham.

In keeping with its complete history, including its earliest incarnation, the college celebrated its 150th anniversary in the academic year 2018–2019, coinciding with the 2018 Ball 'Continuum'. The 50th anniversary of the establishment of the College itself, as a college, was celebrated in 2012.

=== College name ===
In 1931, the delegacy officially acquired the name, "St Catherine's Society", with the current spelling. Variations of St Catharine having been used by the students for their sporting teams and various clubs since the 1870s, the name was already strongly associated with the delegacy. First forming a social club in April 1869, the students called it the "Clarendon University Club", taking that name from the Old Clarendon Building where the delegacy had been allocated a room. The students soon expanded their organised activities. By 1874 they began a more comprehensive association, which they called the St Catharine's [sic] Club, after its headquarters, the hall where they dined and held meetings. St Catharine's Hall had long been associated with the saint, having been built c. 1520 as a chapel, popularly called St Catherine's Chapel, (though officially "Chapel of Our Lady at Smith Gate"). Although deconsecrated, the 16th-century appellation of "St Catharine's" remained attached to the site throughout its later history. The building's address at the time of the Club's tenancy was 29 Broad Street; it fronted, though, onto Catte Street, also known as Catherine Street from some point in the late 19th century until 1930—and first recorded as Kattestreete c. 1210, Catte in 1402, Cate or Kate in the 17th century, and Cat or Catte again in the 1800s, the street's name enhancing the association with Catherine.

In this way, the college became indirectly associated with the saint, Catherine of Alexandria. Despite the initially accidental relationship, St Catherine is celebrated as the college's patron saint "with a special Catz Night dinner ... at the end of which a giant Catherine wheel is lit in the quad". Other elements of this can be seen in the college blazon, which depicts four Catherine wheels, one of St Catherine's attributes. While religious iconography can also be seen today in some of the college's symbols, the college's origins were largely secular.

== Buildings ==
=== Original buildings ===
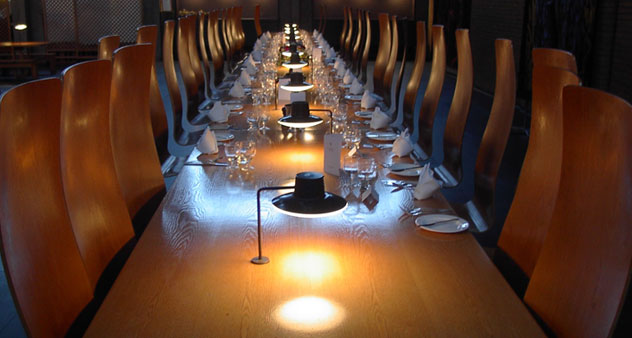
Jacobsen's bespoke furniture and lighting in the Hall

The college is located to the east of central Oxford, on the banks of the River Cherwell. Its buildings in glass, brick, and concrete, by the Danish architect Arne Jacobsen, marry modern materials with a traditional Oxford college layout centred on a quadrangle. Jacobsen designed everything, including the furniture, cutlery, lampshades, and the college gardens, down to the choice of fish species for the pond.

The original St Catherine's buildings are recognised as one of the world's most distinguished examples of modernist design, described by architectural historian Nikolaus Pevsner as "a perfect piece of architecture", and said to have been the architect's personal favourite among his own works. Jacobsen's designs for the college have been the subject of various art and design exhibitions. The original college buildings received a Grade I listing in 1993. In 2020, the college gardens, also designed by Jacobsen, were upgraded to the highest level of protection by Historic England for historical and design interest.

Jacobsen's plans for the college did not include a chapel, which is unusual among Oxford colleges: St Cross Church on the corner of Manor Road and Longwall Street served this purpose before its decommission in 2008. The St Catherine's Christmas carol concert is now held in Harris Manchester College's chapel. The college has a bell tower, particularly visible since no college building is more than three storeys high. An extra floor was reputedly planned for most accommodation blocks, but due to regulations concerning safe building on marshland, this was removed from the final design. The entrance to the college by the water garden was remodelled by Sir Philip Howell in 1968.

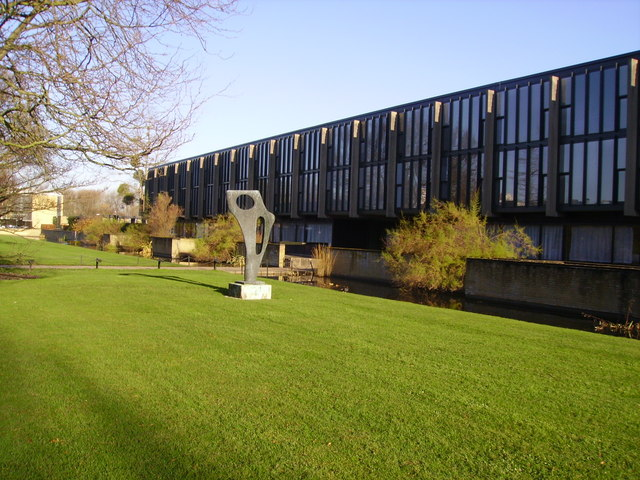
Accommodation

St Catherine's has a number of lecture theatres and seminar rooms, a music house, two student computer rooms, a small gym, squash courts, a punt house, a Grade I listed bike shed and among the most spacious common rooms in Oxford. There are also additional purpose-built conference facilities with lecture theatres, meeting rooms and bar, music room, and car parking available for non-students. The dining hall, which seats 350 diners, has the largest capacity of any Oxford college.

St Catherine's also has a library with over 55,000 volumes, which is used mainly by undergraduates in all the disciplines taught at the college, as well as 14 computer terminals. Law students have additional resources located in the college law library, which is in the Bernard Sunley building. Most tutorials are carried out in college, though some undergraduates may be sent to other colleges. For additional resources, the college is next to the Social Science Library, Oxford and Faculty of Law, University of Oxford, which matriculated students are free to use.

The majority of St Catherine's buildings are in the form of staircases (Note: In the tradition of the colleges of Oxbridge and other UK universities, a staircase is a set of students' rooms, with a ground-floor entrance to a quadrangle.) that open directly onto the quad(s) outside; these are filled with student rooms and office space. There is little indoor space in the college and St Catherine's favours a minimalist, rather austere environment, though still comfortable. Student rooms are light and spacious, notable for their curtain wall glazing. The Built Environment Trust, and its public face The Building Centre, in 2021 named the college's buildings as among the 90 most influential UK buildings or public spaces from the last 90 years.

=== RAAC concrete ===
In September 2023 following reviews of the college site for reinforced autoclaved aerated concrete (RAAC) it was discovered a number of buildings contained RAAC. This has prompted the temporary closure of many of the communal spaces such as the JCR, Hall, kitchens, Bernard Sunley building and library. As of April 2026 the JCR, Hall, and kitchen have reopened.

=== Extensions ===
The college was first expanded in 1983 by Knud Holscher, Jacobsen's assistant. It was also extended by Stephen Hodder in two phases, the first from 1994 to 1995 and the second from 2002 to 2005. The first phase included 54 student rooms and the second phase included 132 student rooms, a new porters' lodge and four seminar rooms. These new buildings form a second quad called 'New Quad' (in comparison to the Jacobsen-designed 'Old Quad'), which is largely used as second-year student accommodation.

=== Graduate building ===
In 2017, Purcell Architects gained planning permission for a further extension at the college. The facilities aimed to resemble Jacobsen's original designs and was built on the college's last available development space. Purcell consulted with Stephen Hodder, who constructed the additional buildings on site during the 1994 and 2004 extensions, when designing the centre. The Ainsworth Graduate Centre is named in honor of Roger Ainsworth, the previous Master of the college. Construction started in July 2018, and was completed in 2019. The centre opened in March 2020 and includes seminar rooms and space for academic works. It also expanded graduate accommodation by creating three new staircases, which contain 78 single rooms with en-suite facilities and a new common room. This is in addition to 42 single rooms, with shared bathroom and cooking facilities, in St Catherine's House, which is off-site on Bath Street.

== Student life ==
St Catherine's has one of the largest undergraduate and graduate intakes among Oxford colleges, admitting 215 graduate students in the 2018–2019 academic year. There is a college bar, as well as a Junior Common Room (JCR) and a Middle Common Room (MCR), which was relocated to the Ainsworth Graduate Centre in 2020 (it was previously located in the Bernard Sunley building).

The JCR is run by a committee of 25 undergraduate students, led by the President and elected by the rest of the student body through 'hustings', or a general Q&A (question and answer) session. The committee fulfills a wide range of duties, aimed at organising events, such as Freshers' week, and providing support to the students. Open meetings are held fortnightly, during which people discuss how to improve the JCR. All undergraduate members are automatically members of the JCR, unless they expressly state that they wish not to be. Honorary membership is also rarely extended to others, with one awarded every five years: honorary members include Robbie Williams and Bradley Walsh. The Catz JCR is financially independent from the College, following a financial committee meeting. Similarly, the MCR is composed of graduate students, visiting postgraduate students, fourth-year undergraduate students and mature (over the age of 21) full-time undergraduate students, who also have JCR membership. It is run by a committee led by two co-presidents, which organises several events such as an annual garden party. The MCR also has benefits, such as a separate kitchen and the exclusive use of an enclosed garden.

The college celebrates its patron saint each year with a special Catz Night dinner, attended by junior and senior members of the college. Every three years the college also holds a ball, usually off-site due to the problem of securing the college's perimeter sufficiently for insurance purposes. St Catherine's is also known for its more modern approaches, such as by not usually requiring students to wear gowns for dinners and voting to end the tradition of standing when the Master enters the hall at formal dinner, although most students still continue in this practice out of respect. The College also holds fortnightly social events called 'Entz', which are usually themed and hosted in the JCR and bar, and an annual Catz Artz Week which showcases creative talents.

The college also has several sport, music and other facilities available on the college site, including squash courts, pool tables, a free gymnasium, a punt house, and theatres. The music house on site is equipped with a grand piano and harpsichord. There are also several clubs and societies available, such as the music society, choir, and subject societies. The dramatic society often performs plays and musicals, including recent adaptations of Rent, Chicago, and Legally Blonde . St Catz has a friendly college rivalry with Magdalen, expressed in sports and in a joke JCR 'declaration of war' in 2013.

=== Accommodation ===
The college is able to offer three-year accommodation for students, with all first years on site. Most first and third years live in the Jacobsen-designed 'Old Quad', the original buildings, while the second years live in the 'New Quad', built during the 1995–2005 extensions. There is a kitchen in every corridor, generally shared between eight to ten people. Bathrooms containing four showers and two toilets are shared between groups of ten people in the Old Quad, while every bedroom in the New Quad is en-suite. Rooms are allocated randomly for first year students, while groups of four to six students in second- and third-year ballot together for rooms. All rooms cost the same in rent.

=== Academic reputation ===
St Catherine's position in the Norrington Table from 2006 to 2016

In 2019, the college ranked 2nd in the Norrington Table, with a score of 77.93% and with 68 out of 145 total Finalists achieving first-class honours. In 2018, the college ranked 3rd with a score of 78.15% and with around 50% of Finalists achieving first-class honors, climbing from 26th place in 2017 when it had a score of 68.68%.

=== Scholarships, awards and outreach ===
The College offers several college prizes and research grants. All College scholarships and prizes are awarded based on academic, social and/or cultural contributions. For instance, the Hart Prize is awarded for the best essay for a historical subject, the Thomas Jefferson Prize is awarded to the North American student who has contributed most to the College, and the Smith Award is awarded for services to drama or music.

The College also awards the Wallace Watson Scholarship each year, one of the most prestigious and generous research and travel scholarships at the University of Oxford. The Wallace Watson Scholarship enables undergraduate and graduate students to undertake research fieldwork or remote travel during their time at Oxford. Additionally, the college offers the Emilie Harris Award for those aiming to help or work with the under-privileged communities, the Antony Edwards Bursary for Spanish cultural or language studies, and the Patricia Knapp Travel Award for travel with a medical purpose.

The College is also involved in many fully-funded outreach programmes, such as the Catalyst Programme, which is a sustained contact model during which schools may visit the college and outreach staff may provide workshops on applications, picking A-Levels and exploring careers. The purpose of the programme is to increase the success rate of applicants. The College also has ties with Northern Ireland through the Northern Ireland Residential Summer School, which allow Northern Irish students to visit the college and experience life as an Oxford students, while teachers may have a Q&A session with tutors. The College also has partnerships with several other schemes and charities, such as Target Oxbridge, UNIQ and the Pathways Programme.

=== Rowing ===
St Catherine's College Boat Club is the rowing club of the college. British Olympic gold medallists Sir Matthew Pinsent and Andrew Triggs Hodge, and silver medallist Colin Smith all rowed for the college.

=== In popular culture ===
St Catherine's College has served as a filming location for several films and television series. It featured as 'Lovelace College' in Season 4 of the British crime series Endeavour. The British spy drama Chokepoint was filmed in locations around the College, such as the SCR and the Bernard Sunley Building. Director SG Smith said it was a good location as the college was "a good fit with the overall aesthetic of the show". In Season 4, episode 6 of The Crown, the Hall at St Catherine's serves as the venue of a state reception in Hobart, Tasmania, attended by Prince Charles and Princess Diana in their 1983 tour of Australia.

== Notable alumni ==
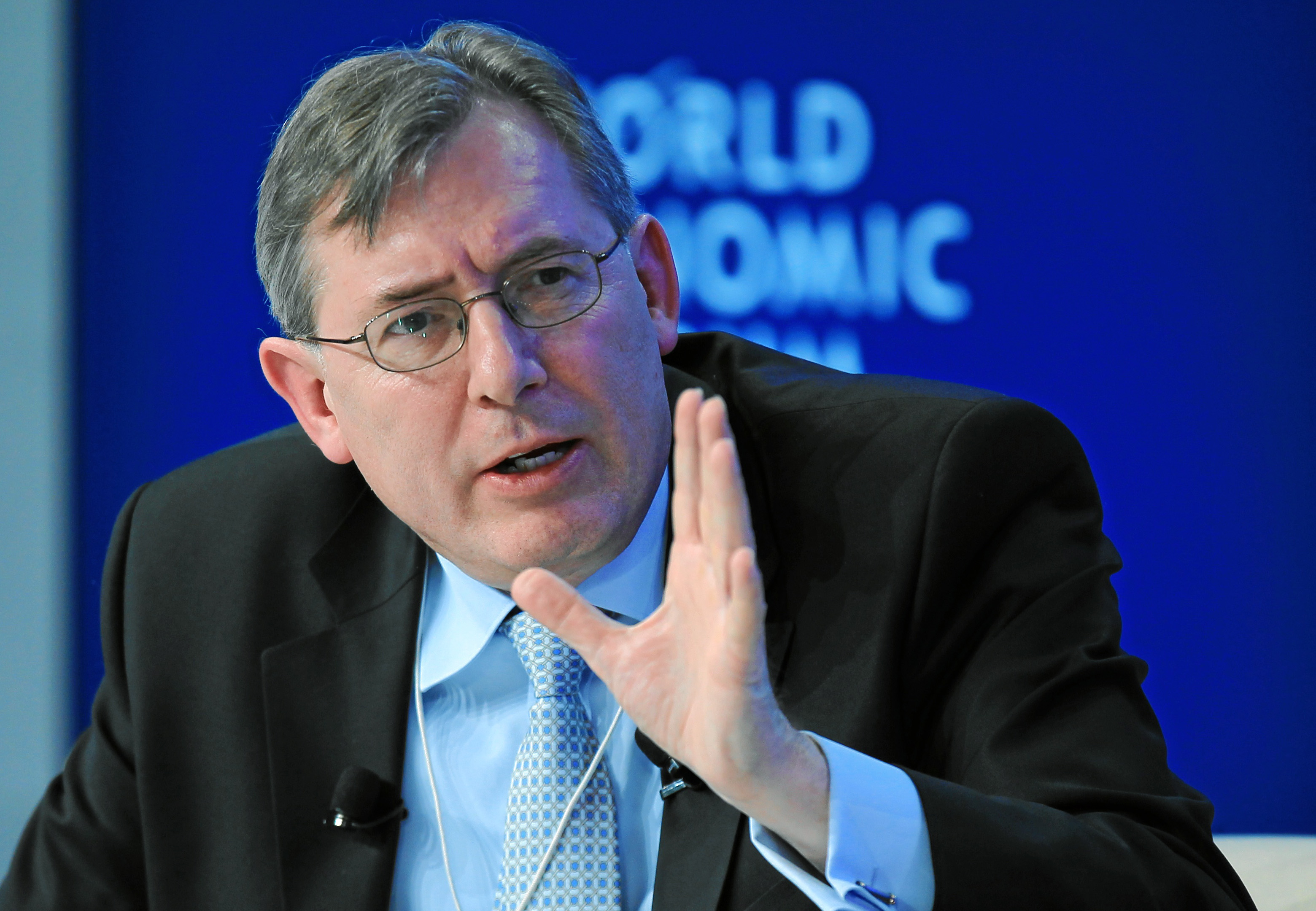
Hans-Paul Bürkner, Chairman Emeritus of the Boston Consulting Group

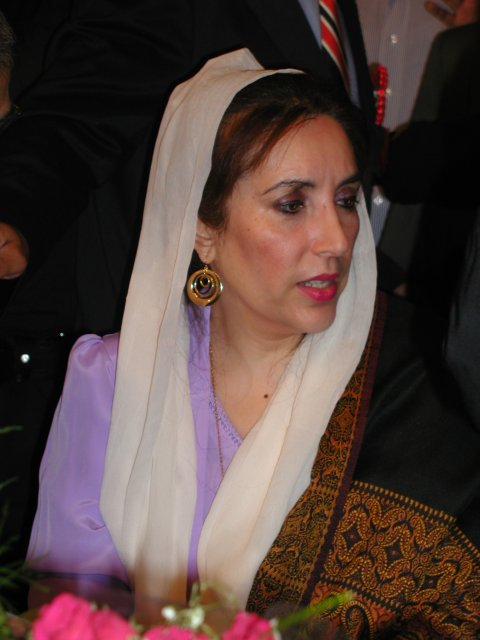
Benazir Bhutto, former Prime Minister of Pakistan

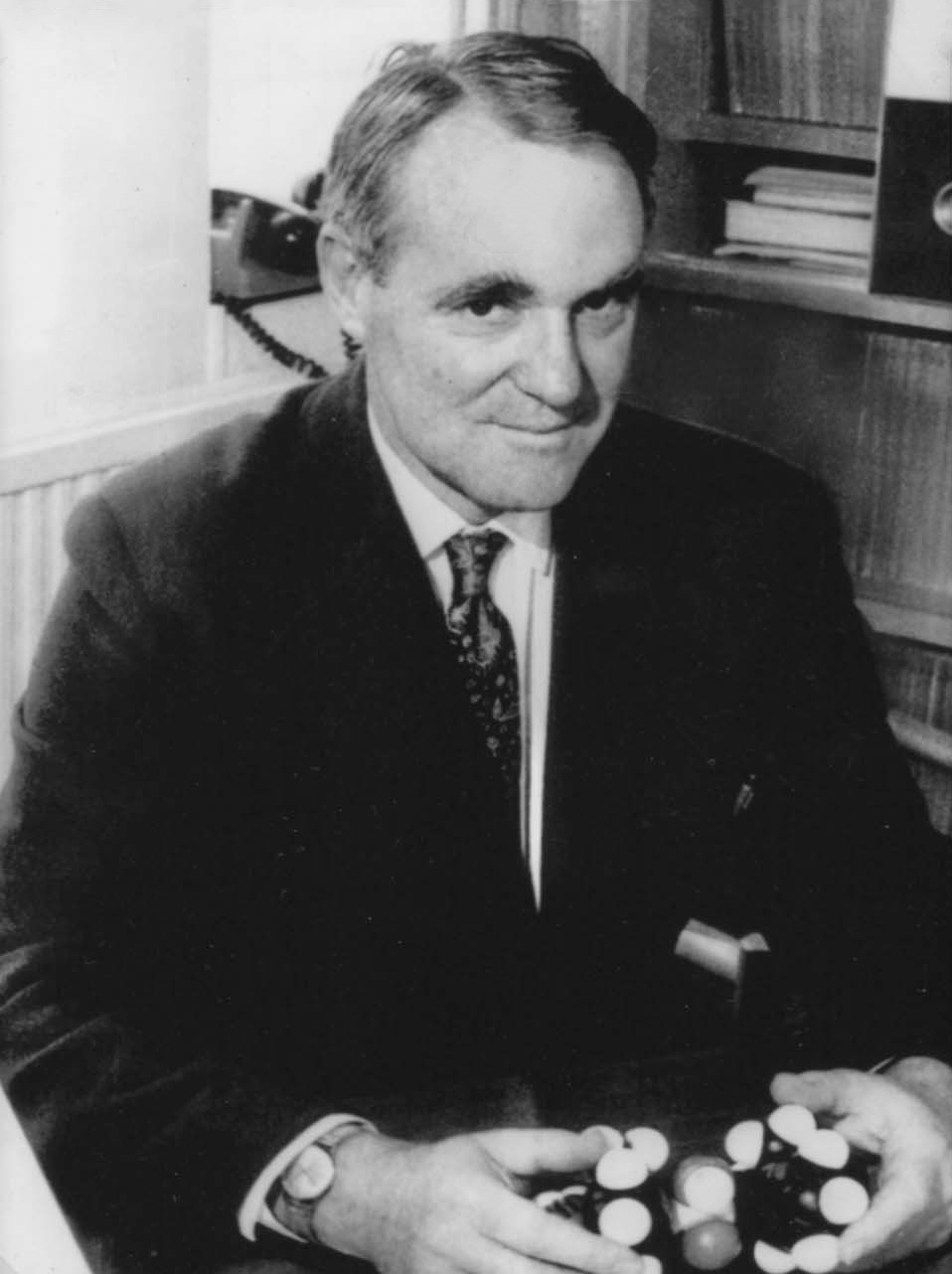
John Cornforth, awarded the Nobel Prize in Chemistry in 1975

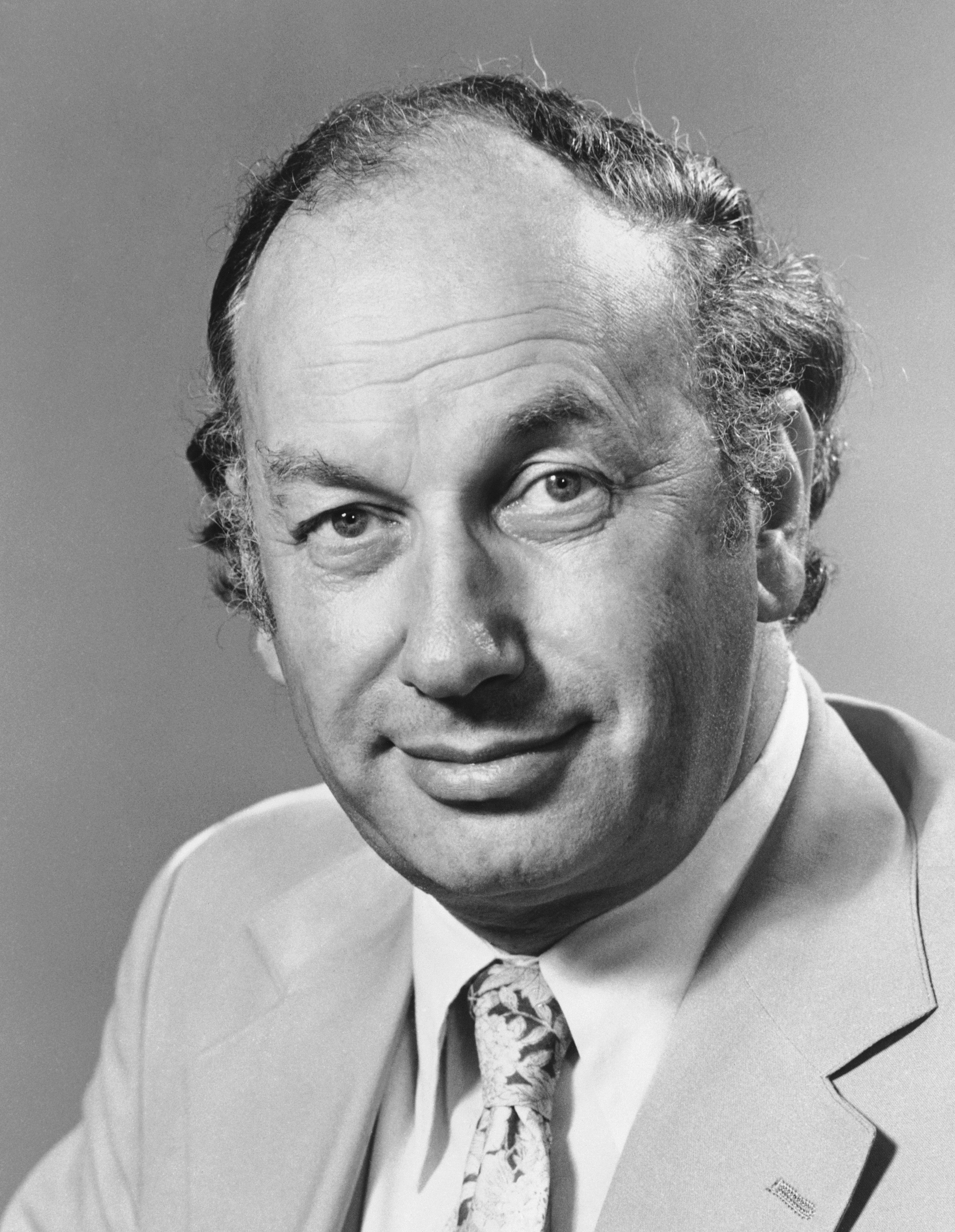
John Vane, awarded the Nobel Prize in Physiology or Medicine in 1982

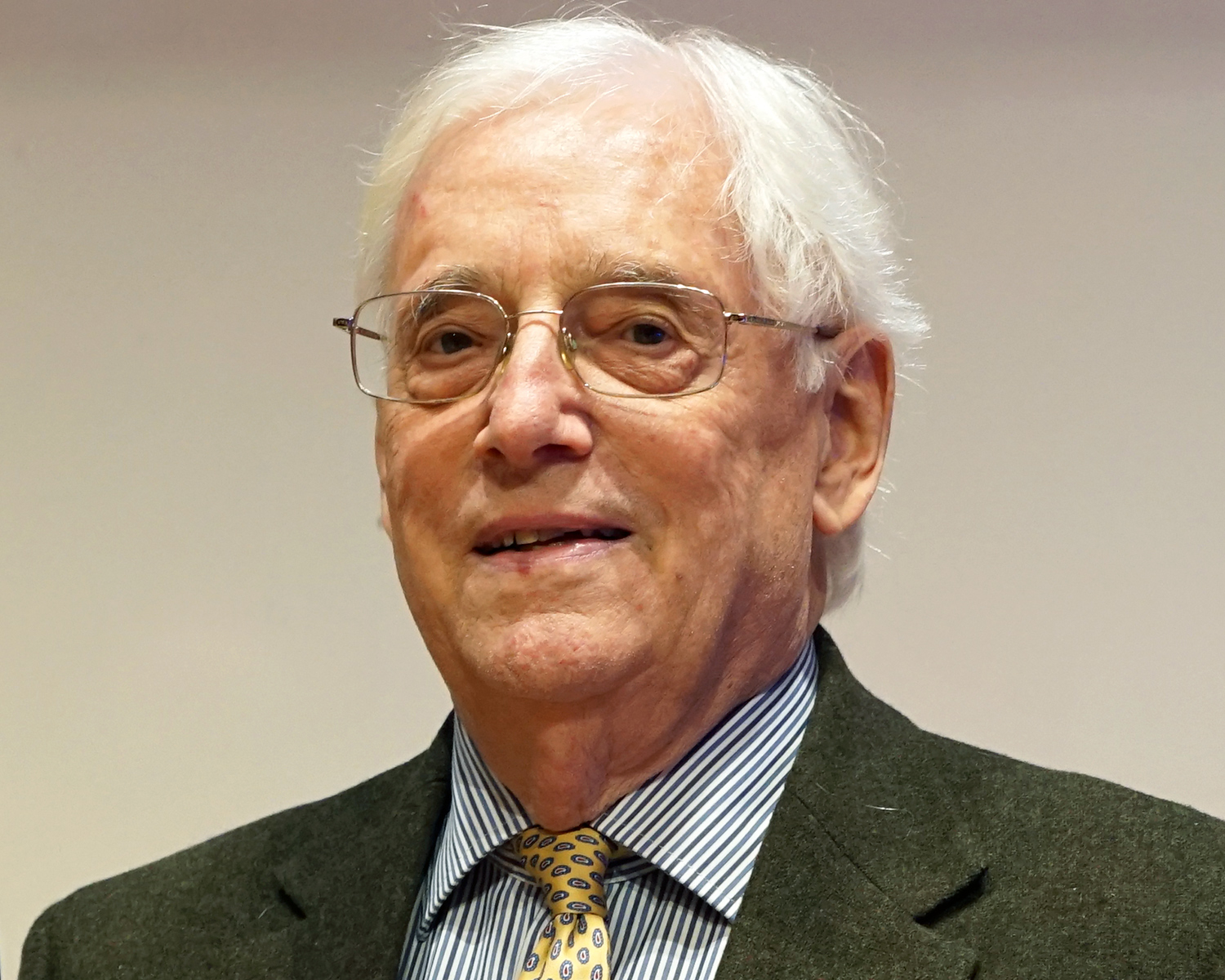
John E. Walker, awarded the Nobel Prize in Chemistry in 1997

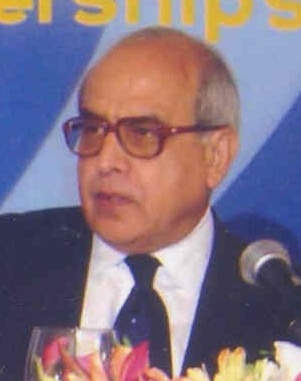
Farooq Leghari, former President of Pakistan

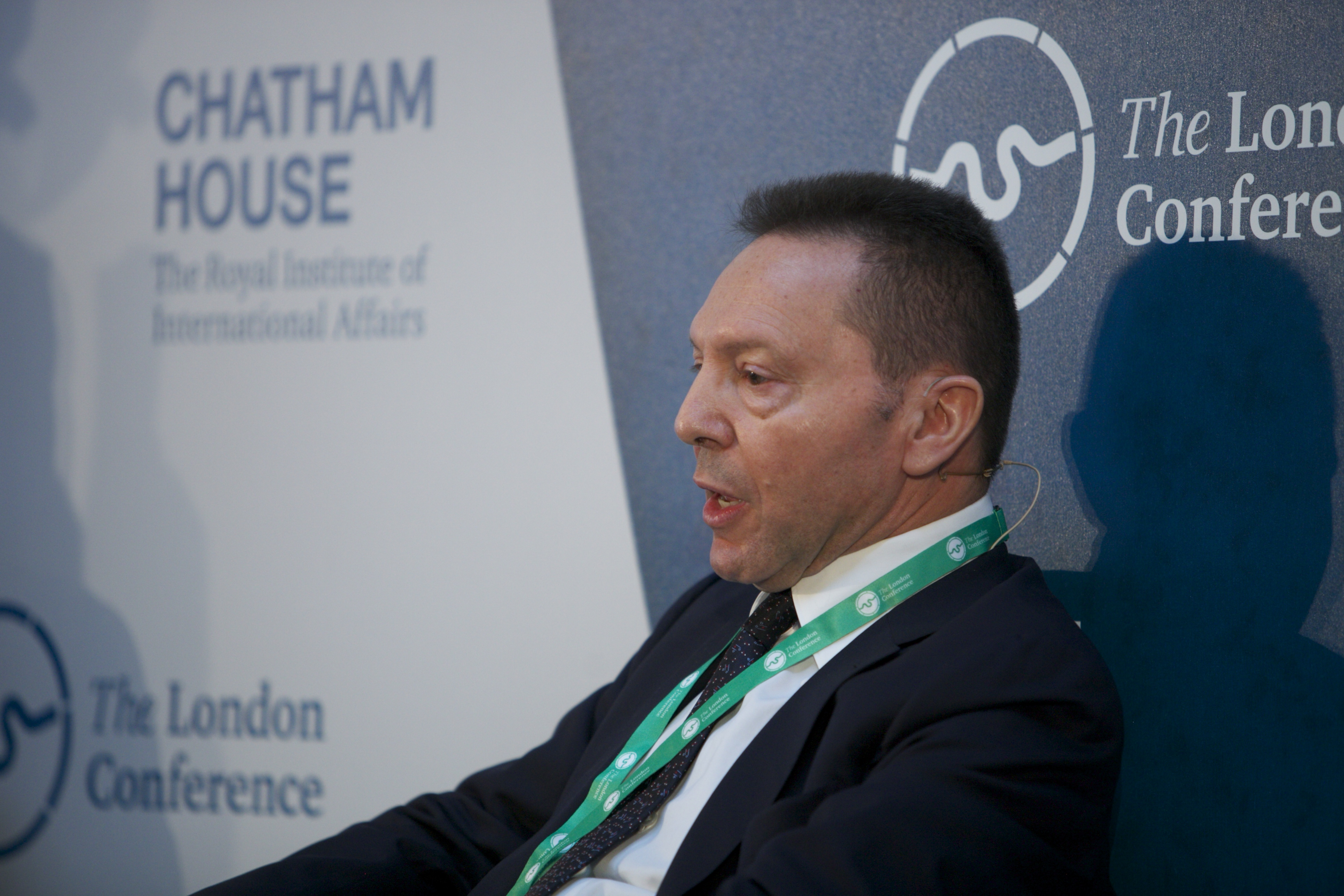
Yannis Stournaras, Governor of the Bank of Greece

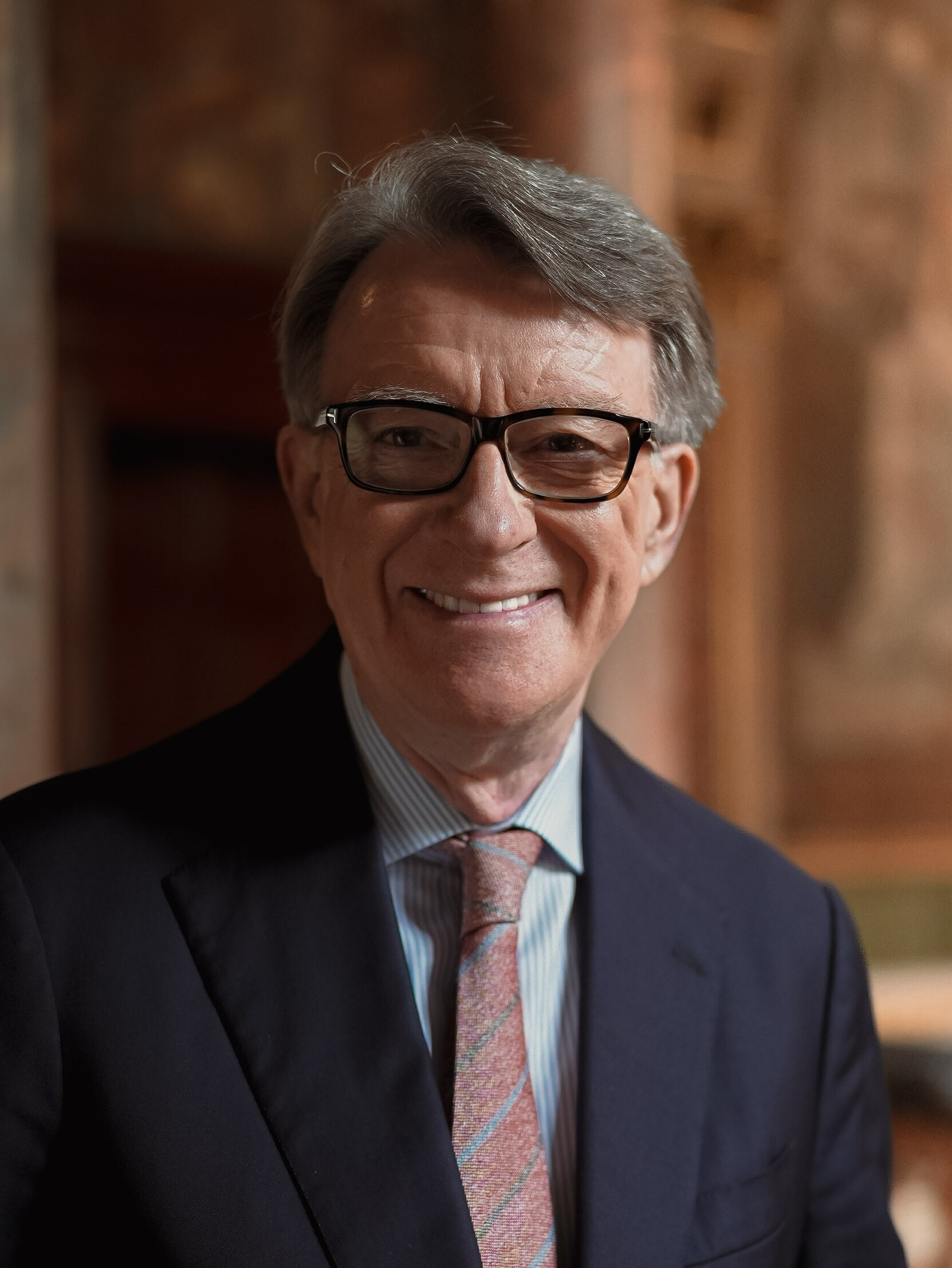
Peter Mandelson, former Labour Party politician, lobbyist and diplomat

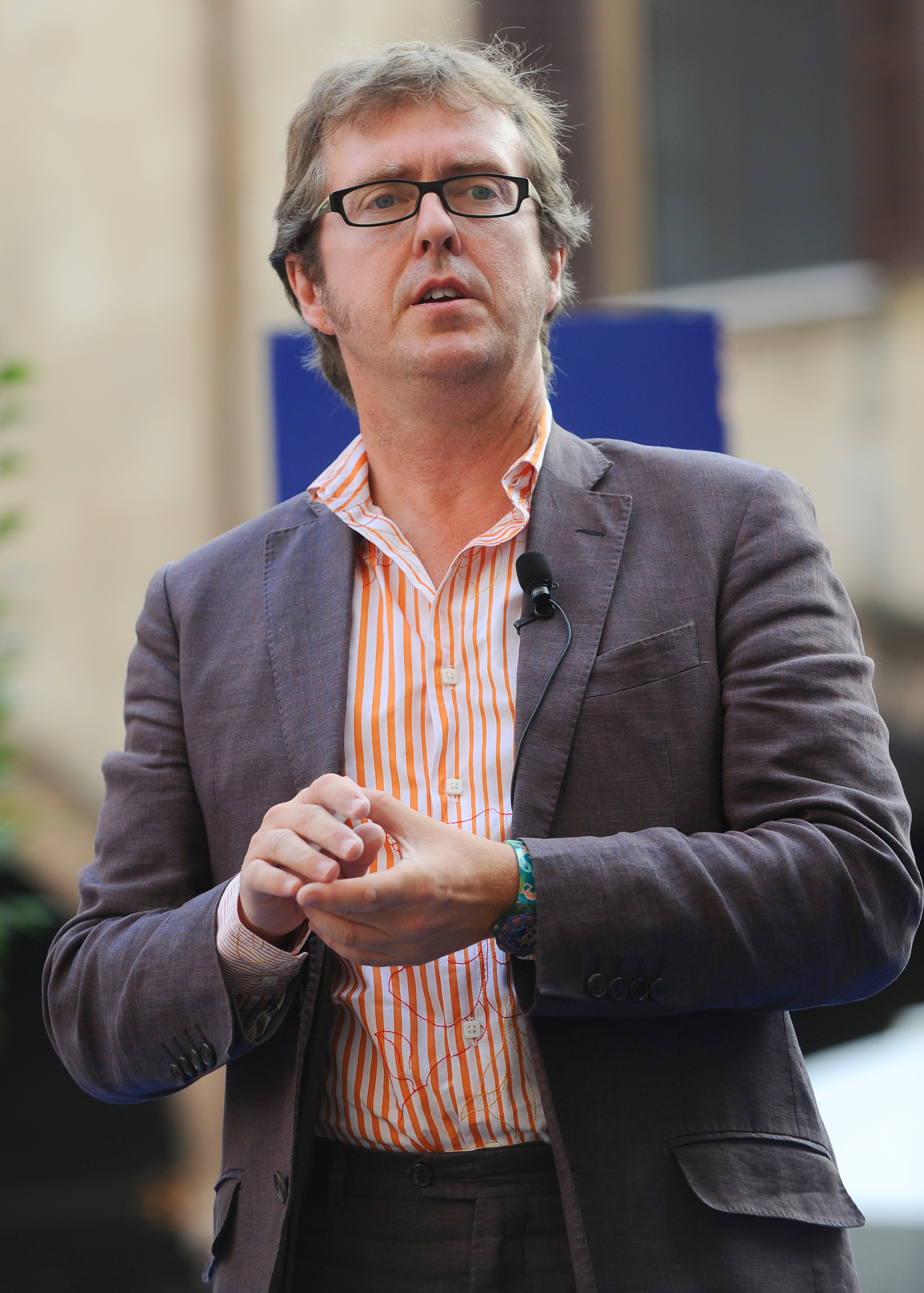
Paul Wilmott, English researcher, consultant and lecturer in the financial field

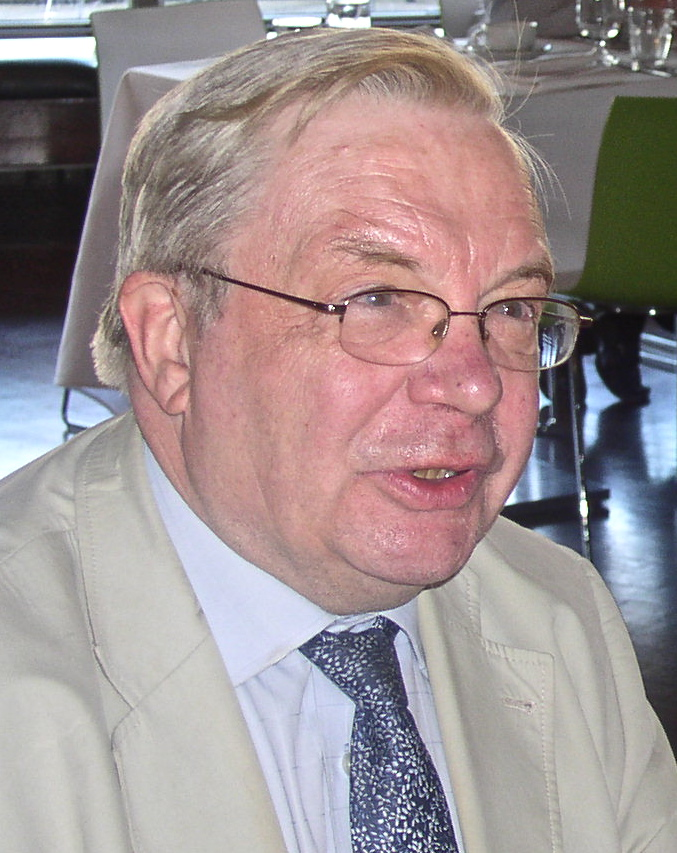
Michael Billington, British author and arts critic

== Censors, masters and fellows ==
=== List of censors ===
A list of the censors of the Delegacy for Unattached Students, the Delegacy for Non-Collegiate Students and St Catherine's Society.

- 1868–1883: George Kitchin
- 1868–1881: George Sturton Ward
- 1883–1887: William Jackson
- 1888–1919: Richard William Massy Pope
- 1919–1930: James Bernard Baker
- 1930–1952: Victor John Knight Brook
- 1952–1962: Alan Bullock

=== List of masters ===
- 1962–1981: Alan Bullock; first master
- 1981–1988: Patrick Nairne
- 1988–1994: Brian Smith
- 1994–2000: Raymond Plant, Baron Plant of Highfield
- 2000–2002: Sir Peter Williams
- 2002–2019: Roger Ainsworth
- 2019–2020: Peter Battle (pro-master)
- 2020–2024: Kersti Börjars
- 2025-: Jude Kelly

=== List of Christensen Fellows ===
Christensen Fellowships are awarded to distinguished academic visitors who are members of their national academy – equivalent to the Royal Society and the British Academy in the UK – or likely to attain that standard if at an earlier stage in their academic career.

- Söhnke M. Bartram
- Christoph Bode
- MacDonald P. Jackson
- John F. Helliwell
- Vijay Mishra
- Gjertrud Schnackenberg
- K. G. Subramanyan
- Reza S. Abhari
- Michael Heffernan

=== List of Cameron Mackintosh Visiting Professors ===
The Chair of Contemporary Theatre, founded through a grant from the Mackintosh Foundation at St Catherine's College in 1990, aims to promote interest in, and the study and practice of, contemporary theatre. The Visiting Professorship is awarded to a new chair on an annual basis. Throughout their tenure, the holder of this chair usually delivers two public lectures, and one, or sometimes more, smaller more intimate student workshops, which are usually conducted at the College.

- 1990: Stephen Sondheim
- 1991: Sir Ian McKellen
- 1992: Sir Alan Ayckbourn
- 1993: Michael Codron
- 1994: Sir Peter Shaffer
- 1995: Arthur Miller
- 1996: Richard Attenborough (Lord Attenborough)
- 1997: Sir Richard Eyre
- 1998: Thelma Holt
- 1999: Dame Diana Rigg
- 2000: Sir Nicholas Hytner
- 2001: John Napier
- 2002: Stephen Daldry
- 2003: Sir Tim Rice
- 2004: Patrick Marber
- 2005: Phyllida Lloyd
- 2006: Sir Patrick Stewart
- 2008: Kevin Spacey
- 2009: Michael Frayn
- 2010: Sir Trevor Nunn
- 2011: Meera Syal
- 2012: Sir Michael Boyd
- 2013: Sir Stephen Fry
- 2014: Simon Russell Beale
- 2016: Claude-Michel Schönberg
- 2017: Sir Tom Stoppard
- 2019: Deborah Warner
- 2021: Adjoa Andoh
- 2023: Gregory Doran
- 2025: Es Devlin
- 2026: Cate Blanchett

== Gallery ==
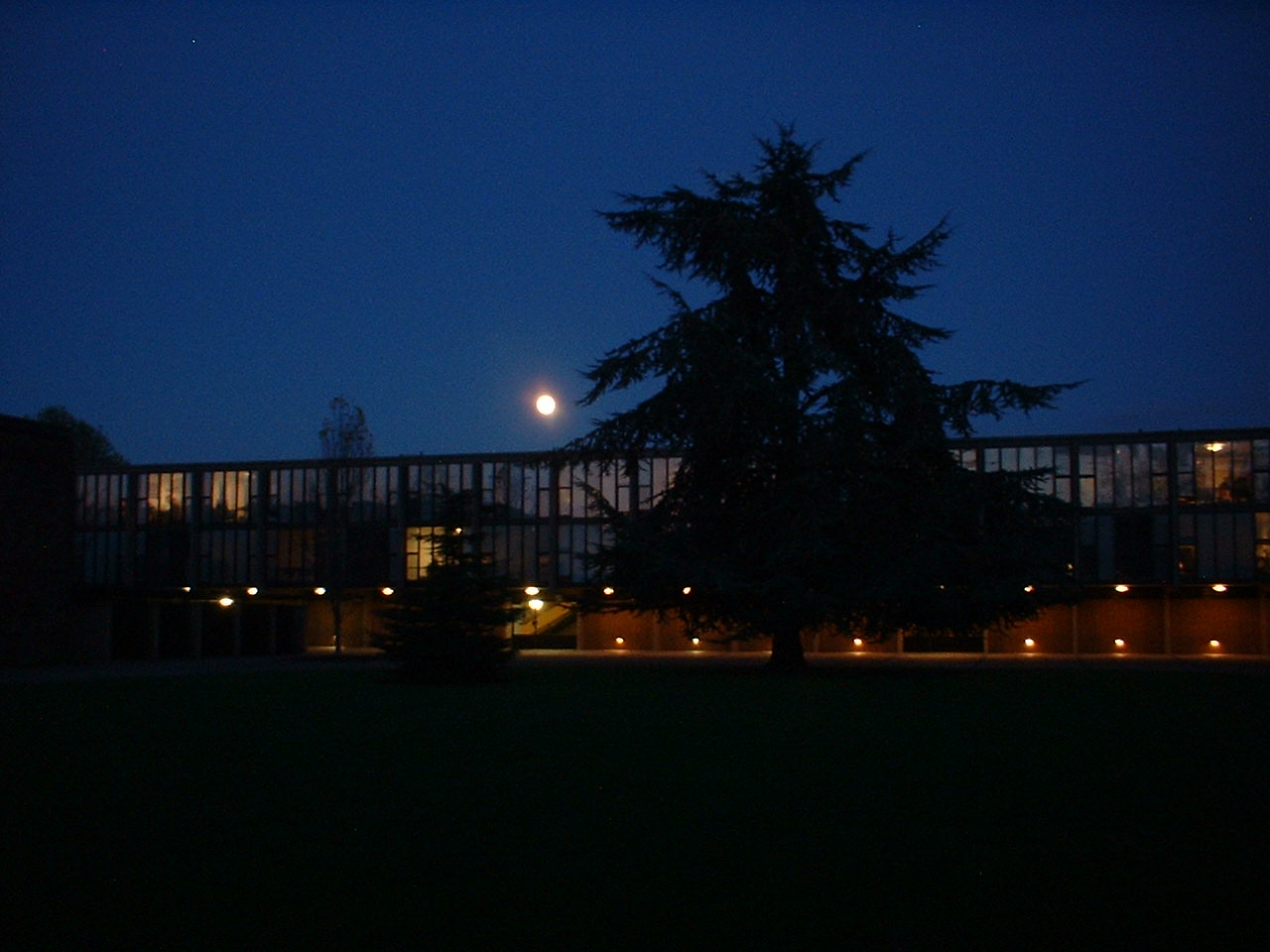
View of the quad at night

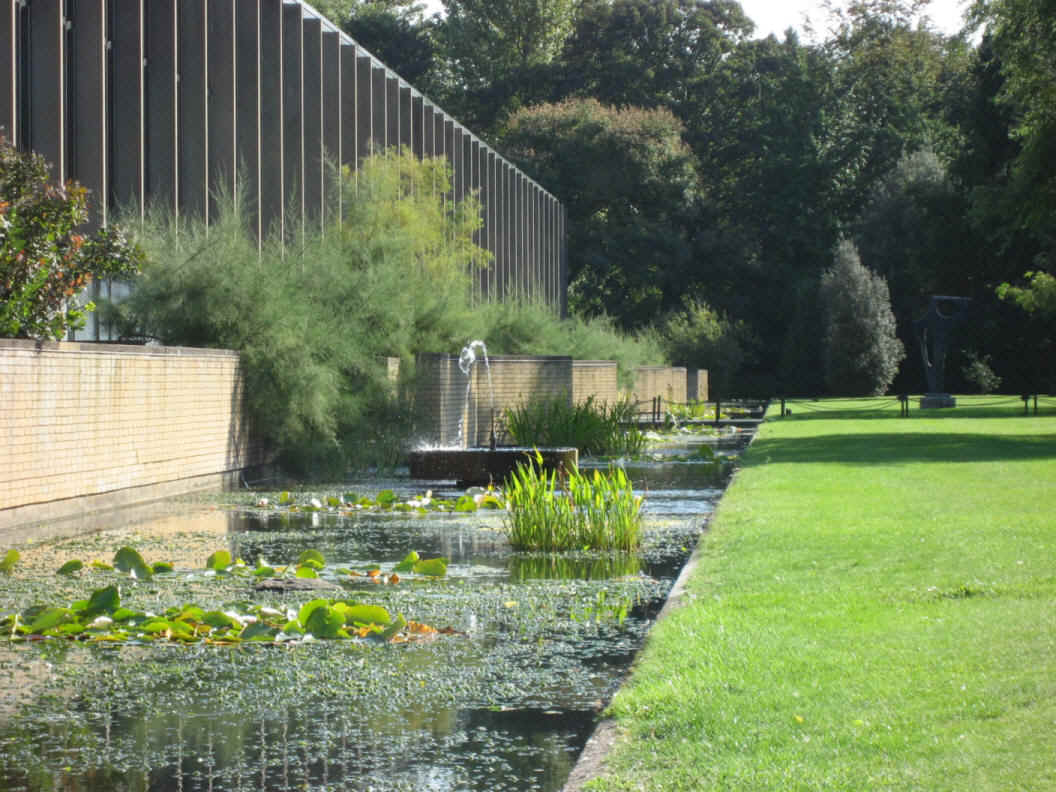
View of the water garden along the west side of the site, toward the small bridge that was part of the original entrance sequence

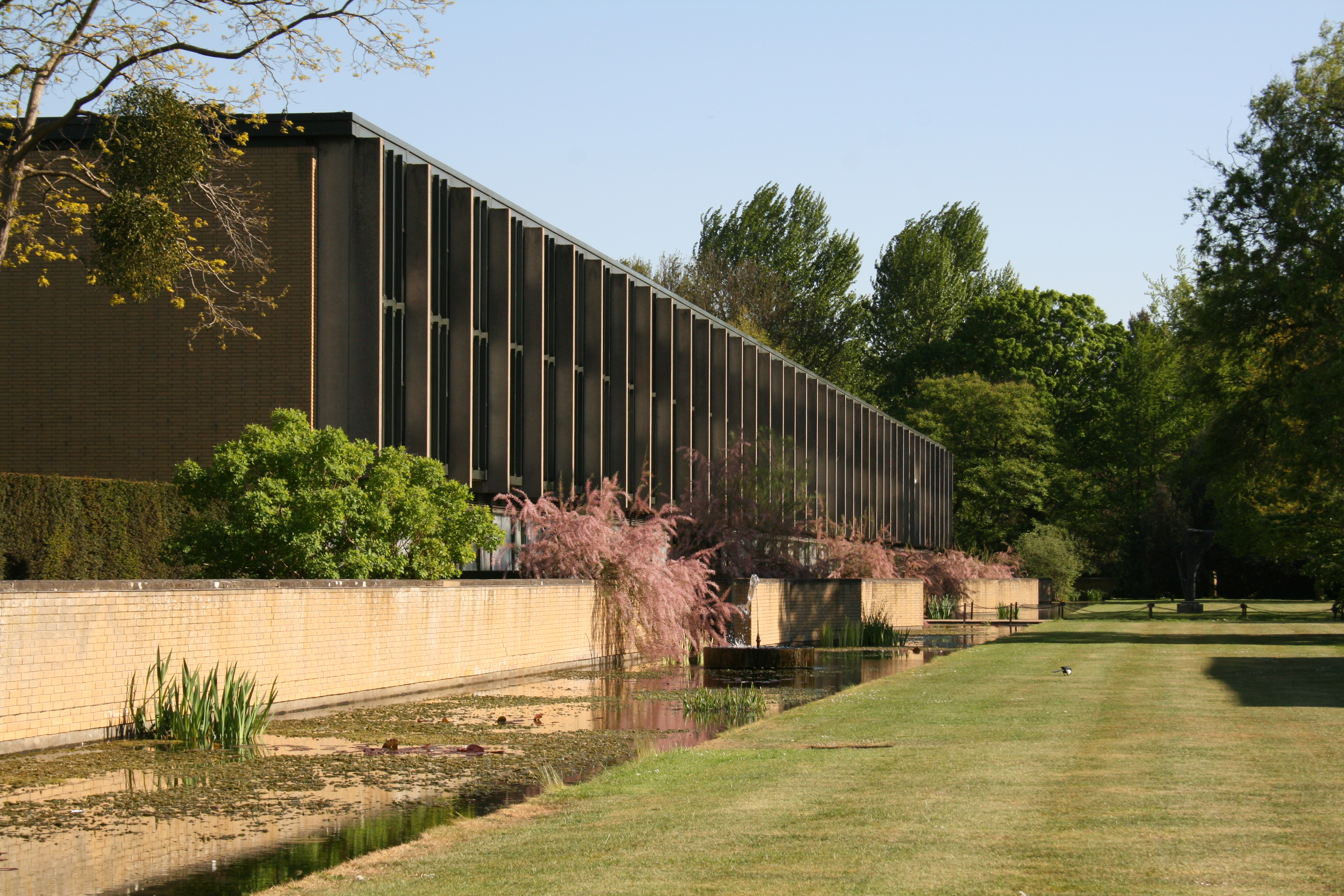
View of the west-side accommodation and water garden

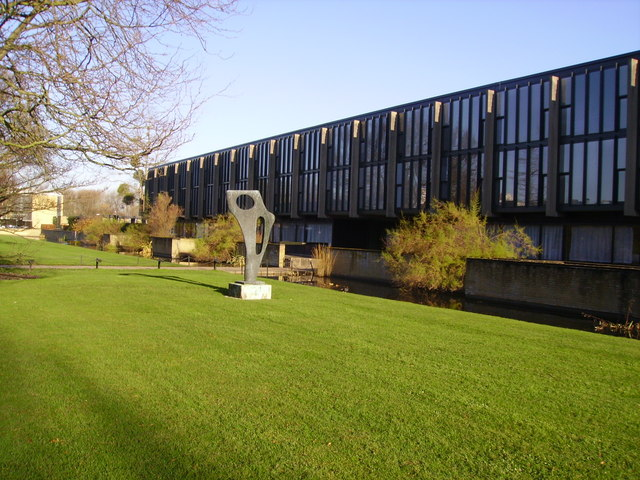
View of west-side accommodation from far-end of college, facing in the direction of the Porter's Lodge

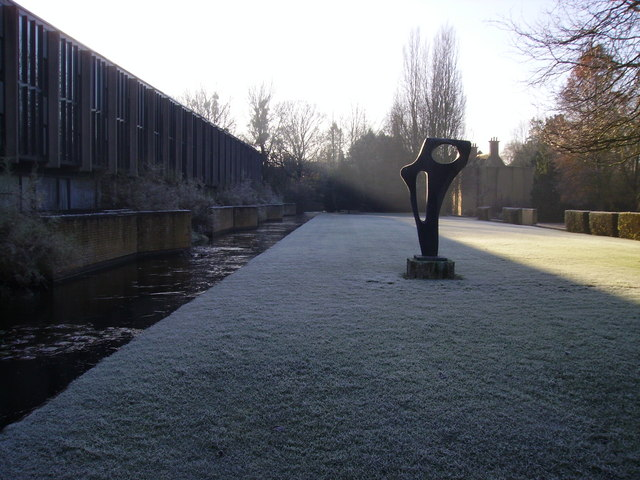
View of west-side accommodation in winter, facing the Achaean

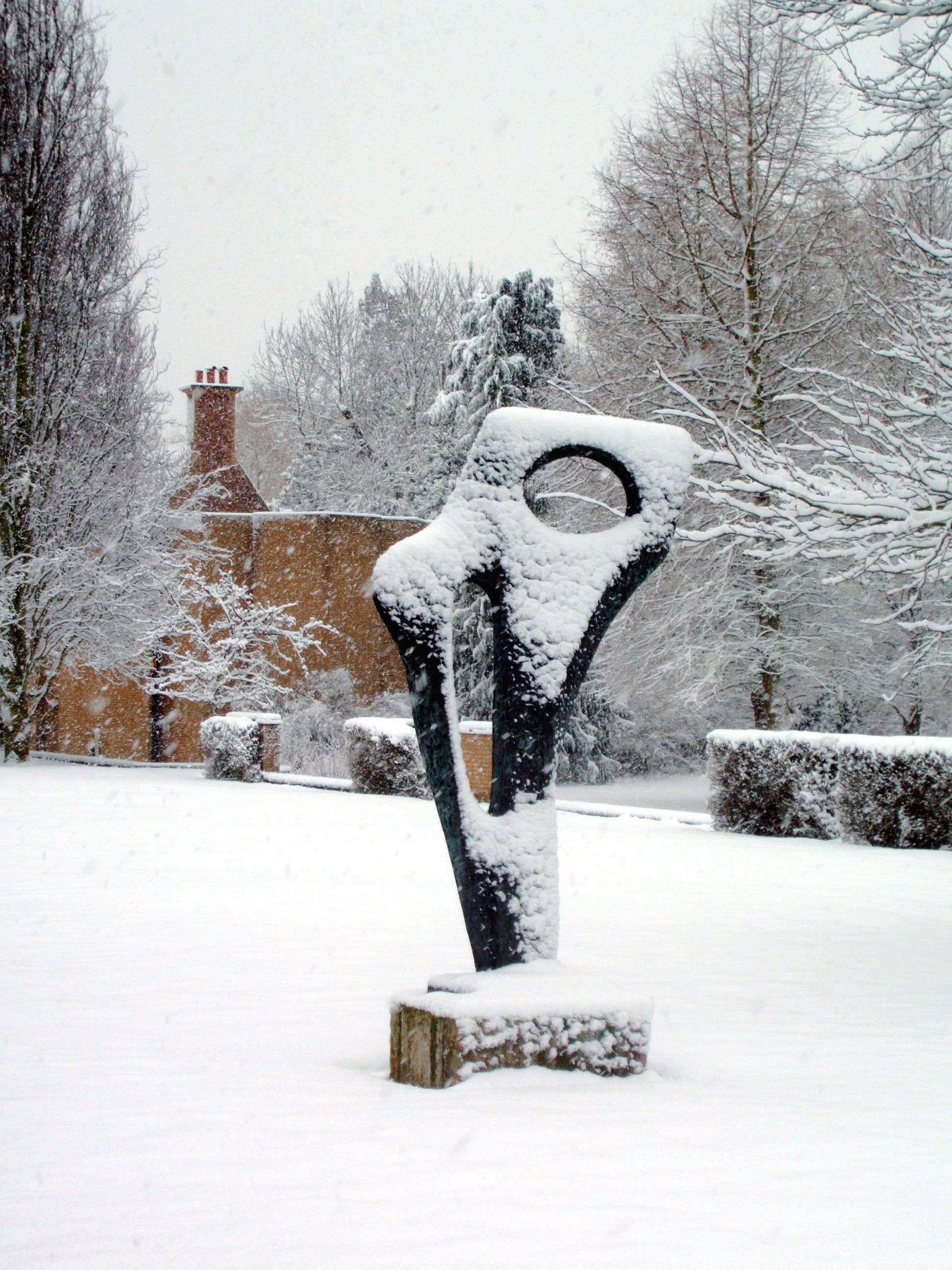
Statue outside the old porter's lodge in snow, Achaean by Barbara Hepworth

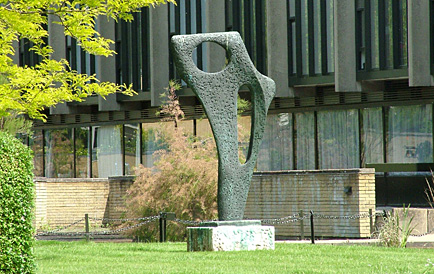
Barbara Hepworth's Achaean at St Catherine's College, Oxford

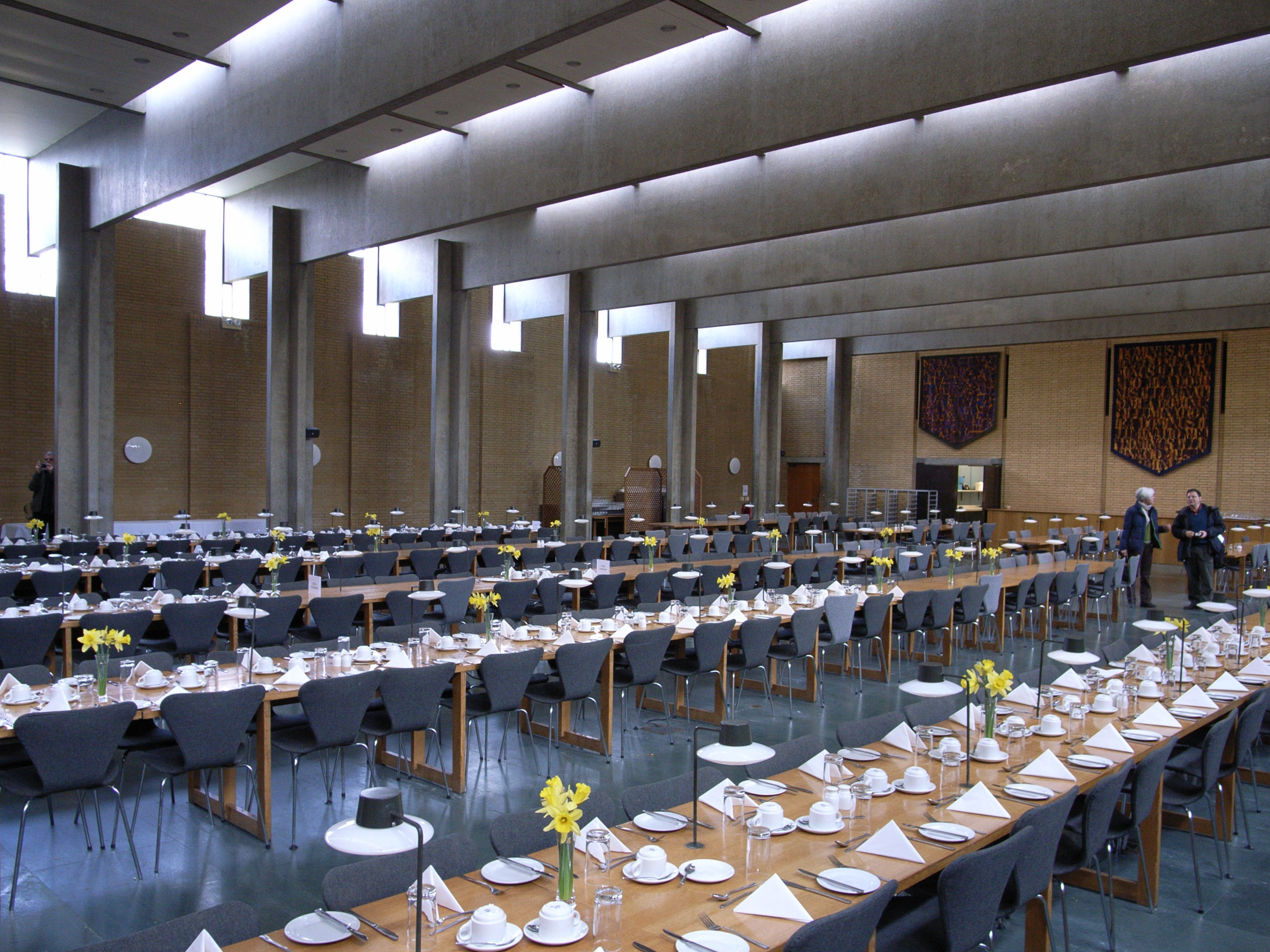
Dining hall of St Catherine's College, Oxford

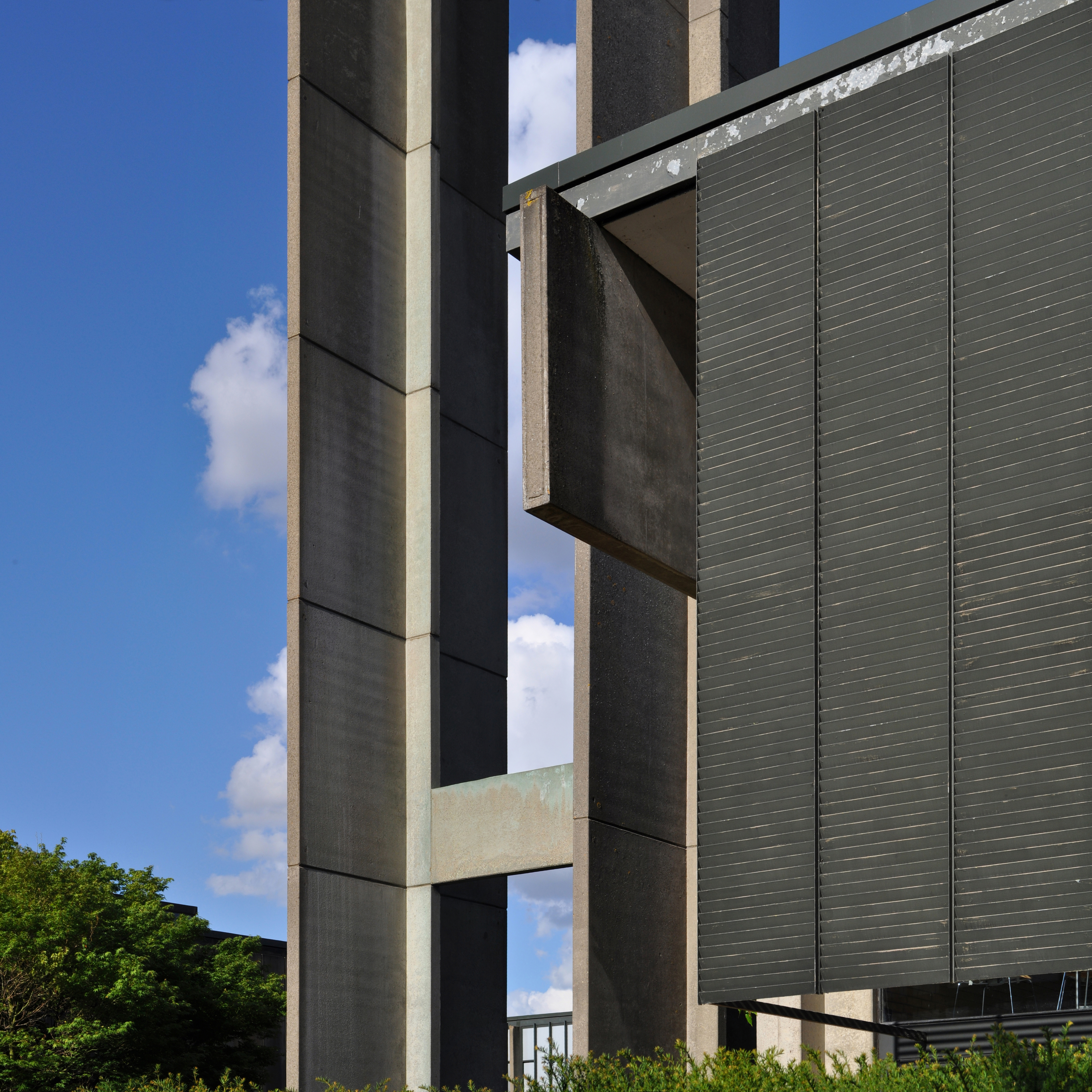
Architectural detail showing portion of the Bell Tower and Old Quad accommodation

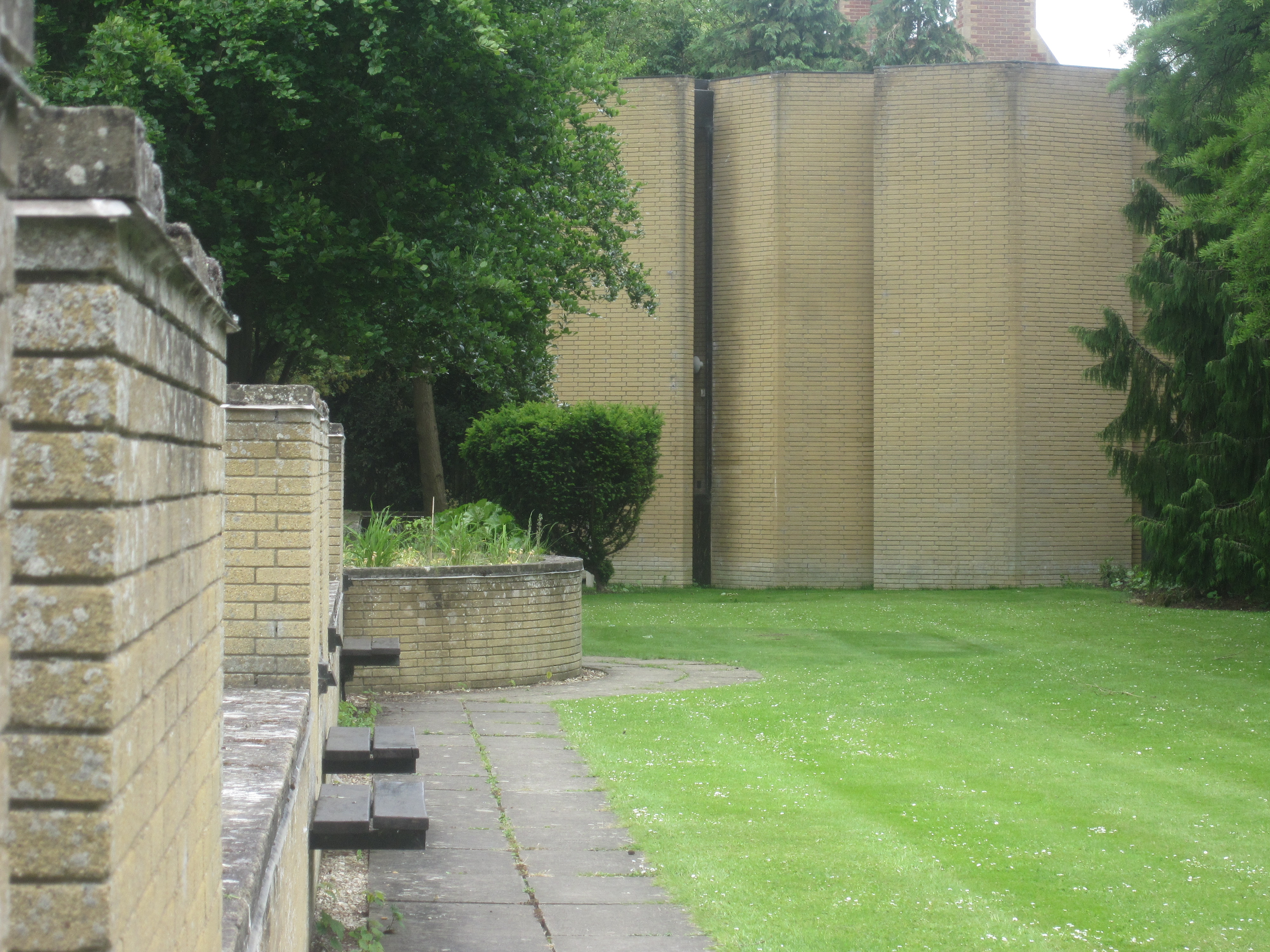
St Catherine's College Music House

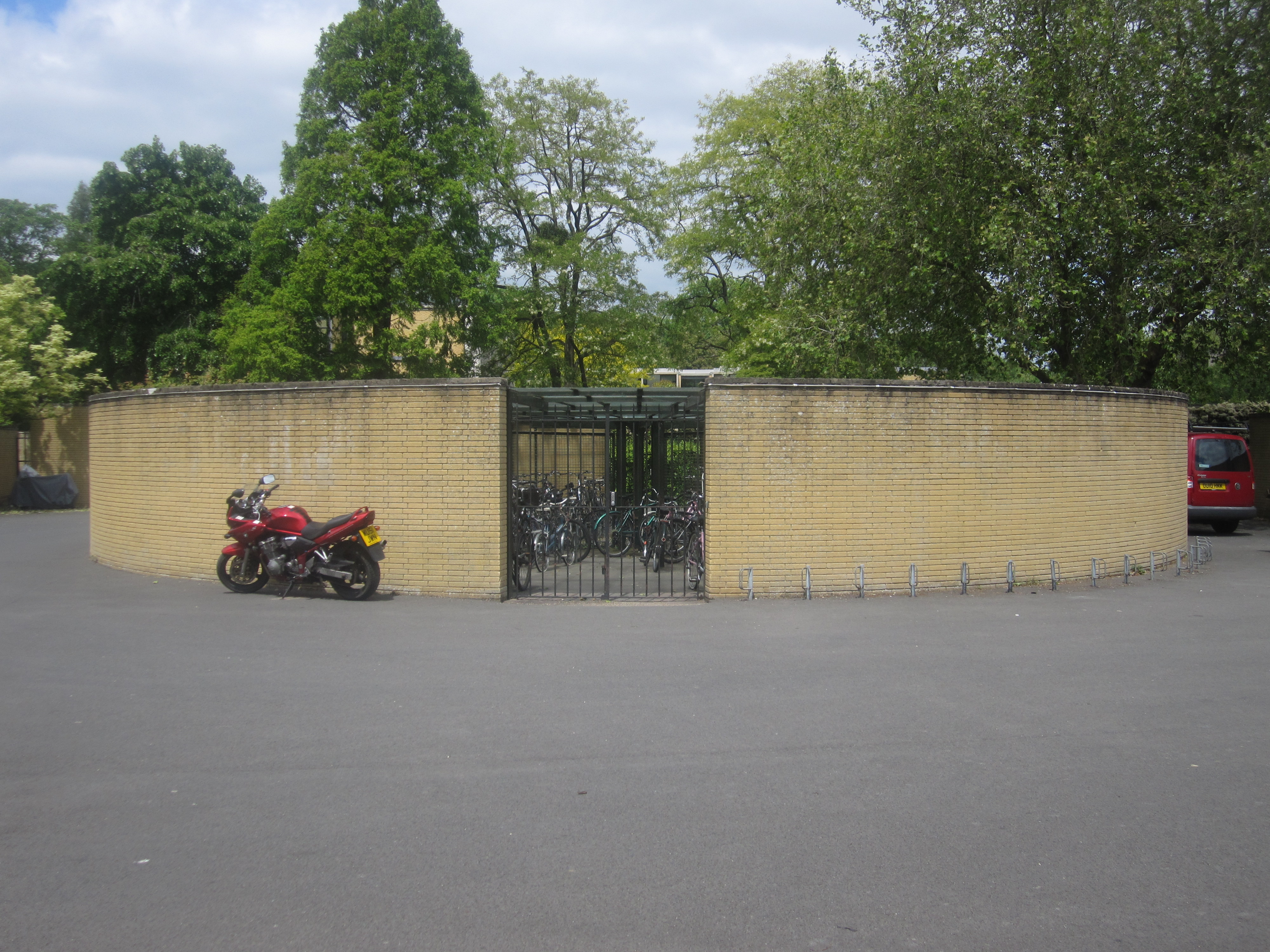
The college's Grade I listed bike shed

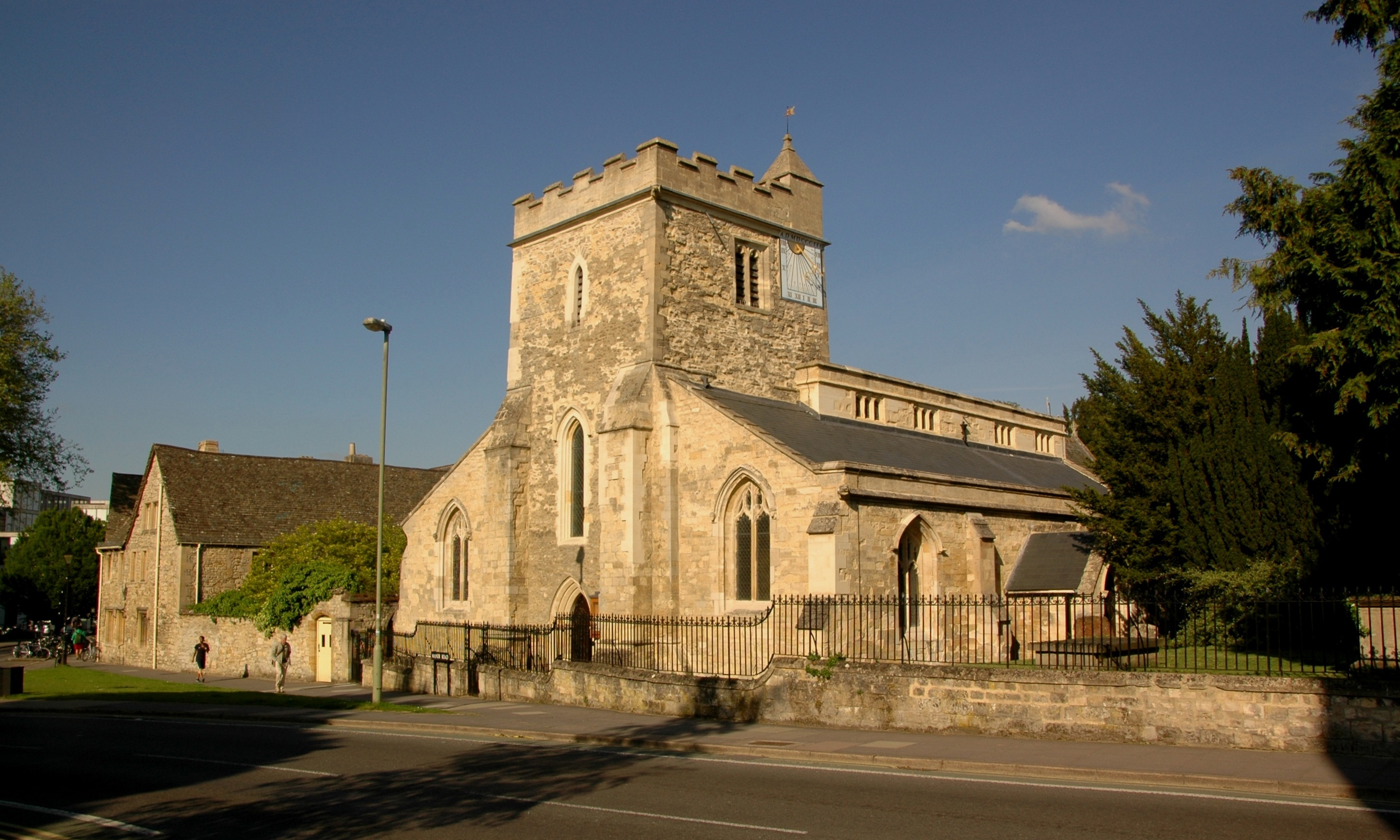
View of St Cross Church at entrance of St Catherine's College
