= The Novel: An Introduction =

Narratology Novel

The Novel: An Introduction is a general introduction to narratology, written by Christoph Bode, Full Professor and Chair of Modern English Literature in the Department of English and American Studies at Ludwig-Maximilians-Universität München. The first edition of Der Roman was published 2005 at A. Francke Verlag (UTB, Tübingen and Basel) in German; in 2011, the second revised and extended German edition followed, as well as the English translation.

== Content ==
A preface precedes the nine thematic chapters; references and an extensive and commented bibliography conclude the book.

=== Preface ===
The preface encourages a departure from the purely formal and narrow text analysis by repeatedly asking the question "What's the difference ?": What kind of effect would have resulted, if the narrator had described certain people, situations or circumstances in a different way? And why did he or she choose not to do this? Taking this approach, the analysis proceeds from the How to the What—and not vice versa. Acknowledgements conclude the preface.

=== Narrative theory and analysis of novels ===
Here, each thematic chapter is described in a short summary without quoting the various literature examples in the text of The Novel: An Introduction.

==== Beginnings - What Do You Expect? ====
The chapter introduces the topic. It discusses the "beginning" and the "meaning" of a novel, the socio-cultural conventions/rules and the methodology of linking the individual events, which may be used in this narrative form, as well as the interactions of these elements. As a special case the autobiographical novel (it's me, who tells) is treated. Finally, a brief discourse is made on capturing the attention of the novel reader: the very first sentences of the story.

==== The Modern European Novel: Predecessors, Origins, Conventions, Subgenres ====
Here, the historical development of the modern European novel is traced. The terms "fact" and "fiction" are explained, and told fiction, illusion and narrated realism be delineated. The diversity of types of novels is outlined.

==== The Object of Every Analysis: The How of the What (Discourse and Story) ====
The introduction to novel analysis is given. A summary table illustrates the thematic terms, which are used by various known narratologists (Gérard Genette, Seymour Chatman, Mieke Bal, Shlomith Rimmon-Kenan, Gerald Prince, and Franz Karl Stanzel).

==== Time ====
Topics in this chapter are the "narrative time", that is, the approximate time required for the reader to read the novel, and the "telling time", i.e. the period that is covered by the novel. Their ratio, the "narrative pace" (narrative pace = telling time ÷ narrative time) may be changed several times within a novel by the narrator and thus be used to slow down (here it is important, here we remain longer) or to accelerate (lessening of importance) the narration.

Furthermore, the "order", the sequence of narrated events - either natural succession or sequence anachronism (prolepsis, i.e. anticipation); analepsis, a flashback) - and the "frequency", that is the repeated narration of identical or equivalent events - discussed. Finally, the importance of using different tempi is elaborated.

==== Characters ====
With examples, Bode analyzes and documents character design and character development in the novel; "figure" means in the broadest sense: a person, a protagonist, a being.

==== Teutonic Rosette or Gallic Taxonomy? Identifying the Narrative Situation ====
This chapter — with more than a quarter of the book the longest — two models of narrative theory, the typological model of Franz K. Stanzel (Bode: "Teutonic Rosette") and the narrative theory of Gérard Genette (Bode: "Gallic Taxonomy"), are explained, compared and commented.

==== Multiperspectivity, Unreliability, and the Impossibility of Editing Out the Gender Aspect ====
This chapter covers aspects and interpretations of multi-perspective narration. It discusses the difficulty to objectively recognize "unreliable narration", that is, "If the reader has reasonable grounds to distrust a tale". It also highlights the problems of the narrators gender and the described figure within the narrative.

==== Now You See It, Now You Don't: Symbolism and Space ====
Here the challenge is addressed, to recognize symbolism in a novel, meaning "if something appears particularly striking". Symbolism does not necessarily mean "a symbol". It rather refers to recognizing allegories, metaphors, metonymies, and to "decode" them, and to wonder why the narrator has just taken this choice of presentation.

"Space" refers to "semantic spaces", i. e. locations (nature, cities, rooms, etc.) described in the plot, which do not only stand for what they are but which the narrator used/constructed in parallel to the figure or the situation of the figure.

==== The End of the Novel and the Future of an Illusion ====
In the final chapter, Bode examines forms of presence or absence of experience(s) of the narrator in respect to his/her narration, the sense, orientation, and sense-making experiments in novels, and finally the future of the printed novel in an environment of ever stronger competition from visual media such as TV, cinema (video, DVD) and audio available on the internet.

=== Further reading ===
Further Reading contains 16 referenced and annotated (by Bode) book titles on subjects of narrative theory/narratology, perspective structure, narrative text analysis and theory of the novel.

The bibliography contains about 400 references on about 30 pages.

== Reception ==
"Appealingly wide-ranging in his choice of illustrative texts, Bode offers us tools for understanding how the narrative techniques of novels affect their content. While the book's topical arrangement facilitates selective reading, its lively and accessible style, nicely preserved in this translation, amply rewards sequential reading."

Nicholas Halmi, University College Oxford

"Moreover, Bode’s clarifications of concepts, jargon and theories, as well as his persuasive emphasis on the ‘possibilities of the generation and construction of meaning’ (p. 256), will make the reader return to this multi-layered and meaningful introduction."

Oana Sinziana Paltineanu, in European Review of History

"With the provocative question "What do you expect?" Christoph Bode sets the tone for this delightful guide to the experience of novel-reading. Ranging from the beginnings of the European novel to twenty-first-century fiction, drawing examples from English, German, French, Italian, Spanish, Russian, and Scandinavian literature, and explicating European and Anglo-American narratological theories, this erudite book remains eminently accessible thanks to its focus on fundamental questions: How do stories begin – and why? Why does fiction evoke reality? How does a narrative manipulate time? Who speaks – and can we believe him or her? What is a symbol and why does it matter? Above all: what's the difference between one way of telling a story and another? In a refreshingly lively style, Bode's The Novel shows students and readers how to ask meaningful questions about the choices that authors make and how to make sense out of the answers."

Angela Esterhammer, Universität Zürich

== Publication information ==
German edition

- Christoph Bode: Der Roman, A. Francke Verlag (UTB 2580; Tübingen, Basel), 1st edition (2005), 349 p., ISBN 3-7720-3366-0 and ISBN 3-8252-2580-1
- same editor, 2nd ext. edition (2011), ISBN 978-3825225803

English edition

- Christoph Bode: The Novel: An Introduction, Wiley-Blackwell, 1st edition (2011), 312 p., ISBN 978-1405194471
