= Roger Ainsworth =

Professor of Engineering (1951–2019)

- Born: Roger William Ainsworth; 17 November 1951
- Died: 23 February 2019 (aged 67)
- Education: Lancaster Royal Grammar School; Jesus College, Oxford
- Scientific career
- Fields: Engineering Science
- Institutions: St Catherine's College, Oxford

Roger William Ainsworth (17 November 1951 – 23 February 2019) was Master of St Catherine's College, Oxford and Professor of Engineering Science at the University of Oxford, England.

== Education ==
Ainsworth was educated at Lancaster Royal Grammar School. After an apprenticeship at Rolls-Royce Aeroengines, he studied at Jesus College, Oxford and was awarded a First Class BA in 1973, and became Doctor of Philosophy in 1976.

== Industry and academic career ==
Ainsworth then worked in industry, initially for Rolls-Royce and later for the Atomic Energy Research Establishment. He returned to Oxford in 1985 as a Tutorial Fellow of St Catherine's College and, from 1998, as Professor of Engineering Science. He was elected Master of St Catherine's in 2002, a role he continued until his death. He was a Pro-Vice-Chancellor of the University from 2003 onwards. In the academic year 1998/99 he served as Senior Proctor. He also served as chair of the board of the Department for Continuing Education.

== Appointments and accolades ==
Among his other appointments Ainsworth was a visiting professor at the École Polytechnique Fédérale de Lausanne. He was a member of the Science Review Panel which advised the Irish Government on the funding of universities; a technical evaluator for the NATO Advisory Group for Research and Development; an advisor to Oxford Catalysts Group plc; a member of the Engineering and Physical Sciences Research Council; a member of the British Association for the Advancement of Science; a member of the Oxford Philomusica Advisory Council; Chairman of the Hinksey Fields Protection Group; Chairman of the Broad Street Plan Group of the Oxford Preservation Trust; and a trustee of the Oxford School of Drama.

He was appointed a Knight of the Order of the Dannebrog by HM The Queen of Denmark in recognition of his promotion of the work of Arne Jacobsen, the Danish architect who designed St Catherine's. He was unable to attend the ceremony at the Danish Embassy and instead the honour was presented to him by the Ambassador, His Excellency Mr Tom Risdahl Jensen, during a college feast.

In 2002, he became an Honorary Fellow of his alma mater, Jesus College, University of Oxford. He was also a Fellow of the Royal Aeronautical Society, elected in 2004 in recognition of his work in the field of jet engine research. In 2017, he became a Fellow of the Learned Society of Wales, a distinction which acknowledged his academic excellence in the subject of mechanical engineering.

He was chairman of the Governors at Dragon School and a former governor (and vice-chairman) of Abingdon School and was awarded an Honorary Old Abingdonian status.

== Personal life ==
He married Sarah Ainsworth in 1978, with whom he had three children. He died of cancer on 23 February 2019.

== See also ==
- List of Old Abingdonians

Academic offices
Preceded by Sir Peter Williams	Master of St Catherine's College, Oxford; 2002–2019	Succeeded by Peter Battle (pro-master)
