= Peter Williams (physicist) =

British physicist, born 1945

Peter Williams CBE FRS HonFInstP FREng
- Born: Peter Michael Williams; 22 March 1945 (age 81)
- Education: Hymers College
- Alma mater: Trinity College, Cambridge; Selwyn College, Cambridge
- Scientific career
- Fields: Physics
- Institutions: Selwyn College, Cambridge; Imperial College London
- Thesis: Defect structure and luminescent properties of semiconductors (1969)

Sir Peter Michael Williams, (born 22 March 1945) is a British physicist.

== Education ==
Williams was educated at Hymers College and completed his undergraduate degree at Trinity College, Cambridge, in 1966, and his PhD at Selwyn College, Cambridge, with a thesis entitled "Defect structure and luminescent properties of semiconductors" in 1969.

== Career ==
He began an academic career at Selwyn College, Cambridge. He then moved to industry and worked first at VG Instruments. He was chief executive of Oxford Instruments from its flotation in 1983 until his retirement in 1998.

Sir Peter is currently chairman of the National Physical Laboratory and vice-president and treasurer of the Royal Society. He was previously master of St Catherine's College, Oxford (2000–2002), president of the Institute of Physics (2000–2002), president of the British Association for the Advancement of Science (2002–2003) and chairman of the UK's Engineering and Technology Board (2001–2006). He has been a member of the InterAcademy Council's Committee to Review the Intergovernmental Panel on Climate Change that reported in August 2010.

In 2005 Williams became the fifth chancellor of the University of Leicester. He was also appointed patron for research at Marie Curie Cancer Care. He retired from this position in 2010. In 2015 Williams was appointed chairman of Kromek, an innovative British tech company making detectors for the medical, security and nuclear sectors.

== Awards ==
He was elected as Fellow of the Royal Academy of Engineering in 1996. He received the CBE in 1992 and was knighted in the Queen's Birthday Honours list of 1998.

He was elected a fellow of the Royal Society in May 1999.

He won the Richard Glazebrook Medal and Prize in 2005.

== Other work ==
He was on the governing body of Abingdon School from 1997 to 2000.

Academic offices
Preceded by Raymond Plant	Master of St Catherine's College, Oxford; 2000–2002	Succeeded by Roger Ainsworth
Preceded by Sir Michael Atiyah	Chancellor of the University of Leicester; 2005–2010	Vacant Title next held by The Lord Grocott
