= North American Society for the Study of Romanticism =

Organization of scholars

The North American Society for the Study of Romanticism (NASSR) is an organization of scholars who hold conferences and publish a scholarly journal, European Romantic Review (ERR). The organization was founded at the University of Western Ontario in 1991, and its first conference was held in 1993. The society is not limited to North American members. The website notes that NASSR scholars "work in a wide range of disciplines, including History, Art History, Women's Studies, Philosophy, Music, Political Economy, and Literature; their interests encompass American, Canadian, English, French, German, Irish, Italian, Russian, Scottish, and Spanish Romanticism." Selected papers from NASSR's annual conference appear each year in a special issue of the academic journal European Romantic Review.
