= Academic ranks in China =

Academic ranks in China are the titles, relative importance and power of professors, researchers, and administrative personnel held in academia.

== Overview ==
Most universities in the People's Republic of China adopt a four-level academic rank system (Senior rank, Vice-Senior rank, Medium rank, and Junior rank), i.e. professor, associate professor, lecturer, and assistant lecturer. More recently, some top universities (e.g. Tsinghua University, Peking University, Shanghai Jiao Tong University) also added the American-style title of assistant professor, typically granted to tenure-track positions, with the expectation that they will be promoted to associate professor (tenured or untenured) and then full professor (tenured) within the academic tenure system.

Most PhD graduates will initially be appointed at the lecturer level and receive the qualification to be promoted to associate professorship after several years of teaching. However, people holding a doctorate from Western universities and with some working experience overseas will occasionally be appointed at a higher level, in exceptional cases at the full professor level directly. Mostly, each individuate institute has only one principal rank (e.g. dean of a college, president of a university) and multiple deputy ranks.

Four-level academic rank in different series (Senior rank, Vice-Senior rank, Medium rank, and Junior rank)

Professor series

- Professor (Senior rank) (教授)
- Associate Professor (Vice-Senior rank) (副教授)
- Lecturer (Medium rank) (讲师) or Assistant Professor (American-style title) (助理教授)
- Assistant Lecturer, or Associate Lecturer (Junior rank) (助教)

Engineer series

- Professorate Senior Engineer (Senior rank) (正高级工程师)
- Senior Engineer (Vice-Senior rank) (高级工程师)
- Engineer (Medium rank) (工程师)
- Assistant Engineer (Junior rank) (助理工程师)

Researcher series

- Researcher (Senior rank) (研究员)
- Associate researcher (Vice-Senior rank) (副研究员)
- Assistant researcher (Medium rank) (助理研究员)
- Intern researcher (Junior rank) (实习研究员)

Academic trainee

- Postdoctoral research fellow (博士后研究员) and research fellow/researcher ( 研究员)
- Research assistant (研究助理) and teaching assistant ( 教学助理/助教)
- Doctoral student (博士研究生)
- Master student (硕士研究生)
- Undergraduate student or Bachelor student (本科生)

Honorary titles

- Academician (院士), a person who was nominated as a member of Chinese Academy of Engineering or/and Chinese Academy of Sciences
- Emeritus Professor (退休教授)
- Honorary Professor (名誉教授), usually awarded to academics with important social contributions
- Distinguished Professor (特聘教授), usually awarded to academics with a recognized achievement in research
- Guest professor, or commonly visiting professor (客座教授), usually awarded to distinguished visiting scholars

Administrative ranks

- Secretary of the CPC Committee (党委书记), similar to Chancellor, who usually does not take administrative responsibilities
- Associate Secretary of the CPC Committee (党委副书记), similar to Vice-Chancellor; the 1st order Associate Secretary is usually appointed President, with other Associate Secretaries being the Vice-President
- President (校长), taking the major decision for academic and administrative affairs, assisted by Vice-Presidents
- Vice-president (副校长), usually taking the responsibility of a certain area, e.g. academic, administrative, facilities, finance, etc.
- Dean (院长/所长)
- Deputy dean or associate dean (副院长/副所长) of schools and faculties
- Director of research centre (部长/主任) and director of academic department (系主任)
