= European Romantic Review =

- Discipline: interdisciplinary
- Language: English

Publication details
- History: 1990 to present
- Publisher: Routledge
- Frequency: Bimonthly

Standard abbreviations
- ISO 4: Eur. Romant. Rev.

Indexing
- ISSN: 1050-9585 (print); 1740-4657 (web)

Links
- Journal homepage; Journal at NASSR

European Romantic Review (ERR) is a scholarly peer-review journal founded in 1990 and devoted to the interdisciplinary study of nineteenth-century culture.

Published six times a year by Taylor & Francis, ERR is closely linked with NASSR (The North American Society for the Study of Romanticism).
