= List of museums in Oxford =

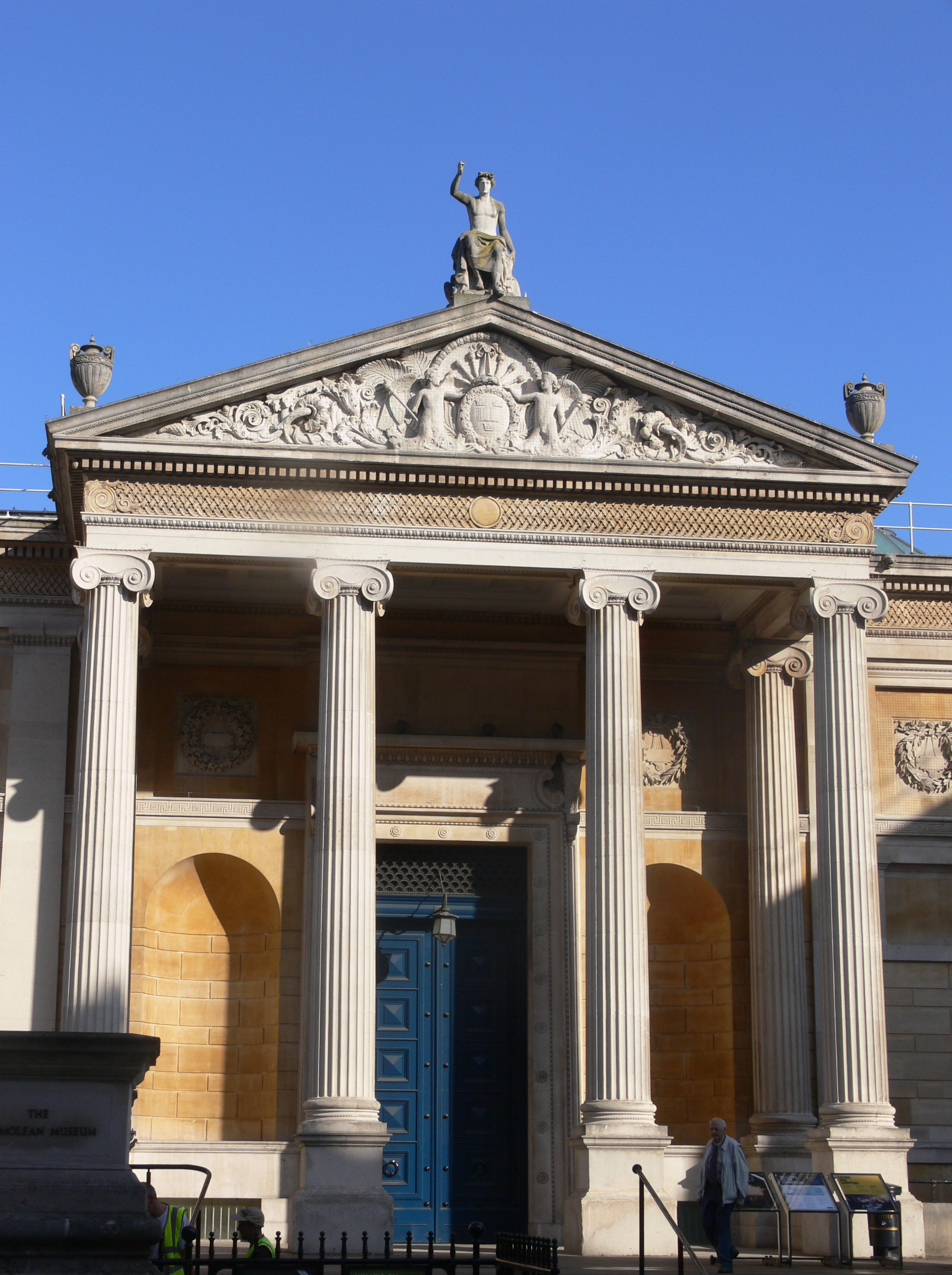
The main entrance of the Ashmolean Museum in central Oxford.

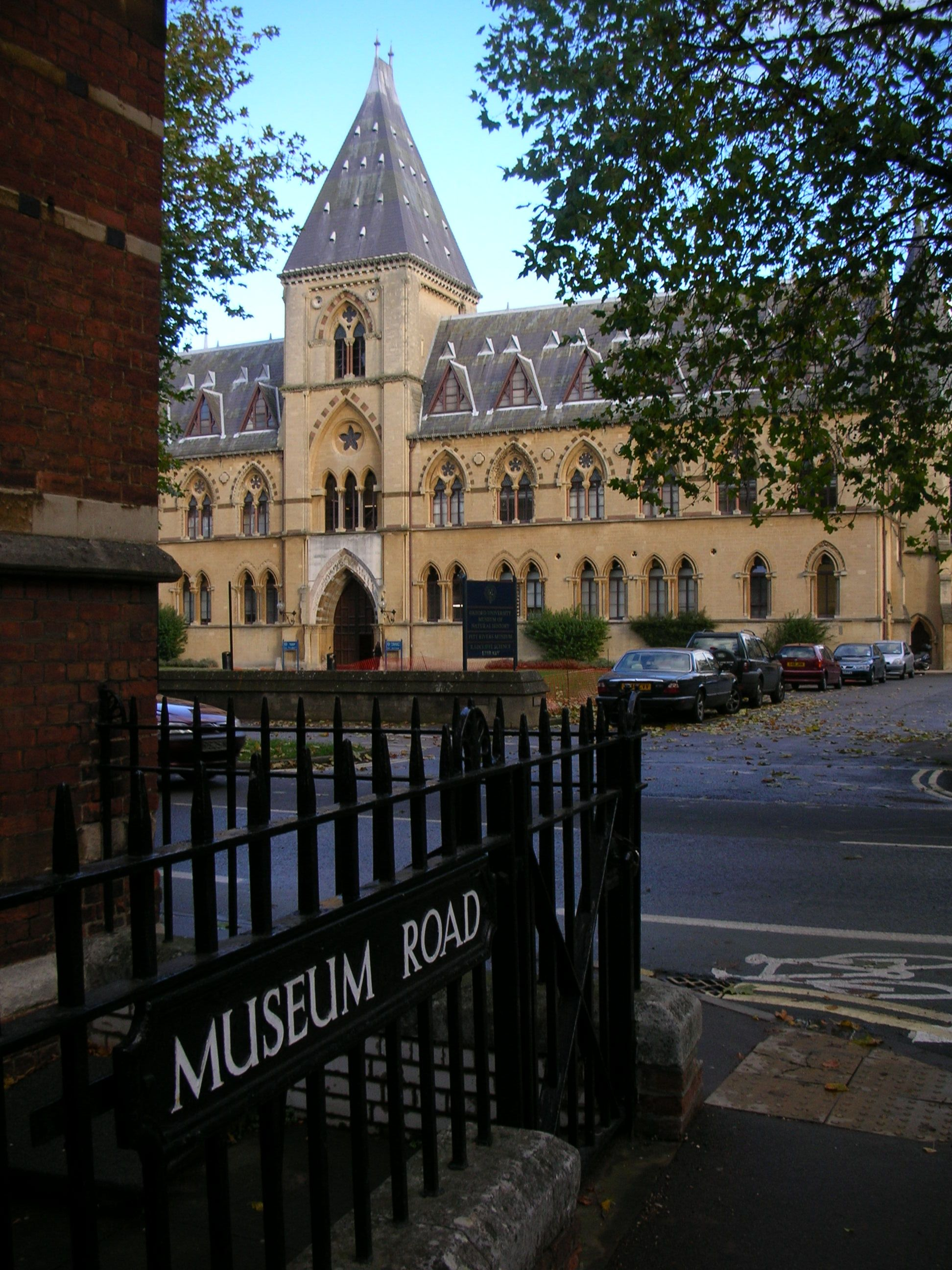
The Oxford University Museum of Natural History viewed from Museum Road.

The following museums and art galleries are located in the city of Oxford, England (with locations), many run by the University of Oxford:

- Ashmolean Museum^{*} (Beaumont Street)
- Bate Collection of Musical Instruments^{*} (St Aldate's)
- Christ Church Picture Gallery^{*} (Christ Church)
- MINI Museum at the Visitor-Centre in MINI Plant Oxford
- Modern Art Oxford (Pembroke Street)
- Museum of the History of Science^{*} (Broad Street)
- Museum of Oxford (Town Hall)
- Oxford Castle – Unlocked (New Road)
- Oxford University Museum of Natural History^{*} (Parks Road)
- Oxford University Press Museum^{*} (Great Clarendon Street)
- Pitt Rivers Museum^{*} (Science Area)
- Science Oxford (St Clement's)
- The Story Museum (Pembroke Street)
- Weston Library* (Broad Street)

^{*} Museums of the University of Oxford.

== See also ==
- List of attractions in Oxford
- List of museums in Oxfordshire
- List of museums in Cambridge
- Virtual Library museums pages (VLmp), started at Oxford University
