= List of tourist attractions in Oxford =

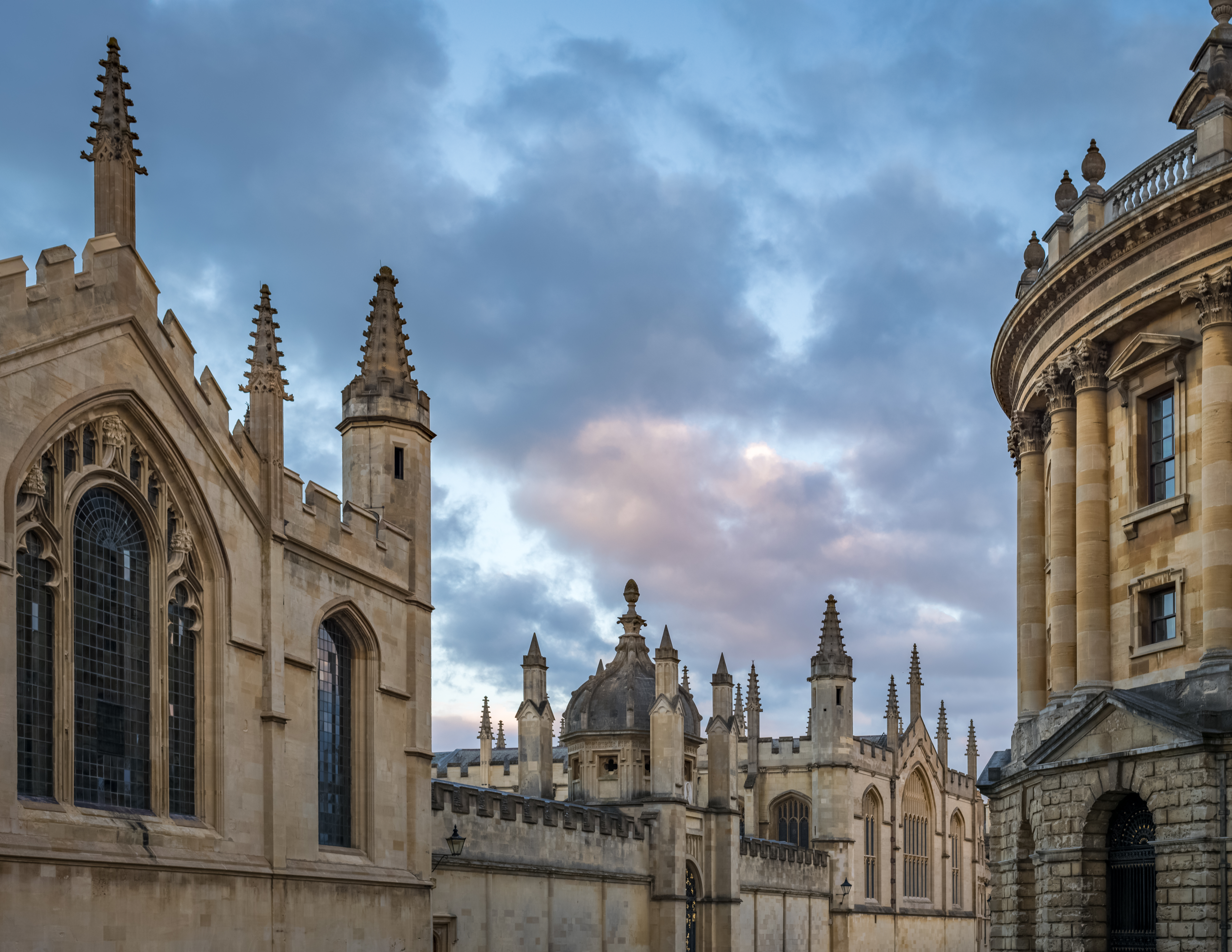
The spires of Oxford during blue hour in April 2023

== Background ==
Oxford City Council in England reported that the city attracts "approximately 7 million daytime and staying visitors per year, generating £780 million of income for local Oxford businesses. In terms of overseas visitors to the UK, Oxford is the ninth most visited city for staying visits in 2021".

The University properties are a major draw for visitors. In particular it noted that "together, Oxford University’s Gardens, Libraries and Museums (GLAM) welcomed 3,816,898 people in 2025".

It goes on to state that nationally in 2024 four of its venues were among the list of top 100 most visited attractions as compiled by the Association of Leading Visitor Attractions (ALVA). These were the Ashmolean Museum (31st), the Bodleian Libraries (37th), Oxford University Museum of Natural History (40th) and the Pitt Rivers Museum (85th).

Most of the Oxford University Colleges are also open to the public, however in many cases visiting times are restricted, may have an admission fee and even require pre-booking.

The lists below reflect the variety of attraction types, with religious, cultural and outdoor venues all available to the public.

== Religious sites ==
- Christ Church Cathedral
- University Church of St Mary the Virgin
- Martyrs' Memorial

== Museums and galleries ==
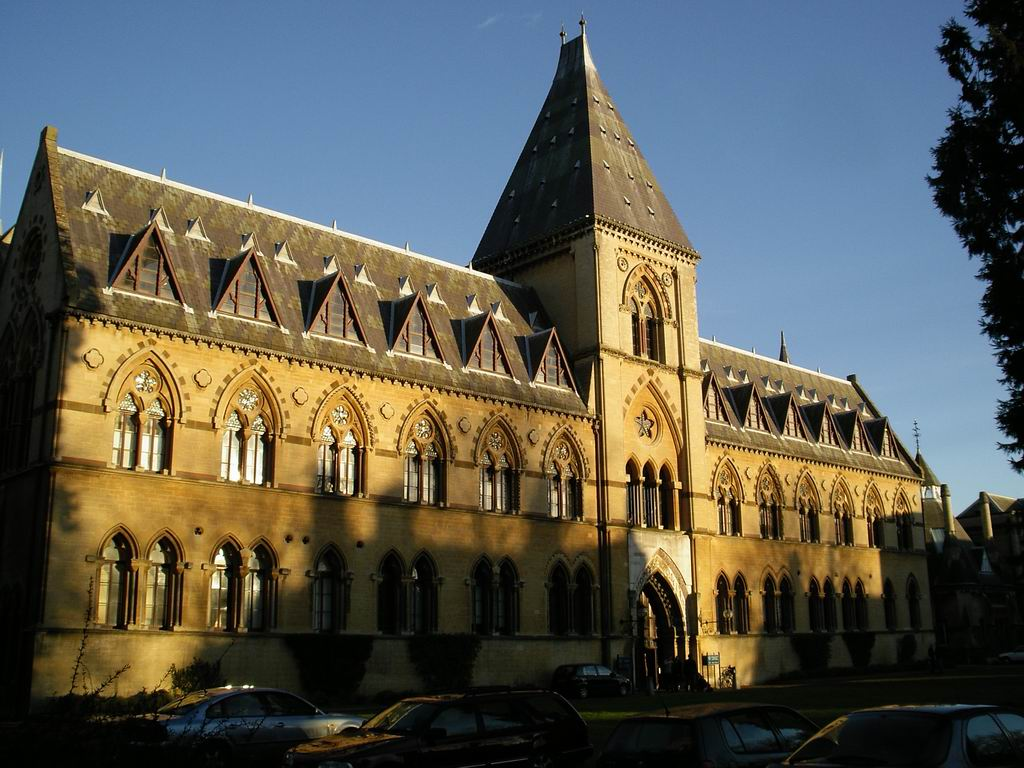
Oxford University Museum of Natural History

=== University of Oxford ===
- Ashmolean Museum – Museum of art and archeology in Oxford, Britain's oldest museum
- Pitt Rivers Museum – Museum of archaeology and anthropology in Oxford, England
- Museum of Natural History - home of (the remains of) the Oxford dodo
- Museum of the History of Science - Britain's oldest purpose-built museum building
- Bate Collection of Musical Instruments

=== Others ===
- Museum of Oxford
- Museum of Modern Art
- Science Oxford
- MINI Museum at the MINI Visitor-Centre at Plant Oxford

== University buildings ==
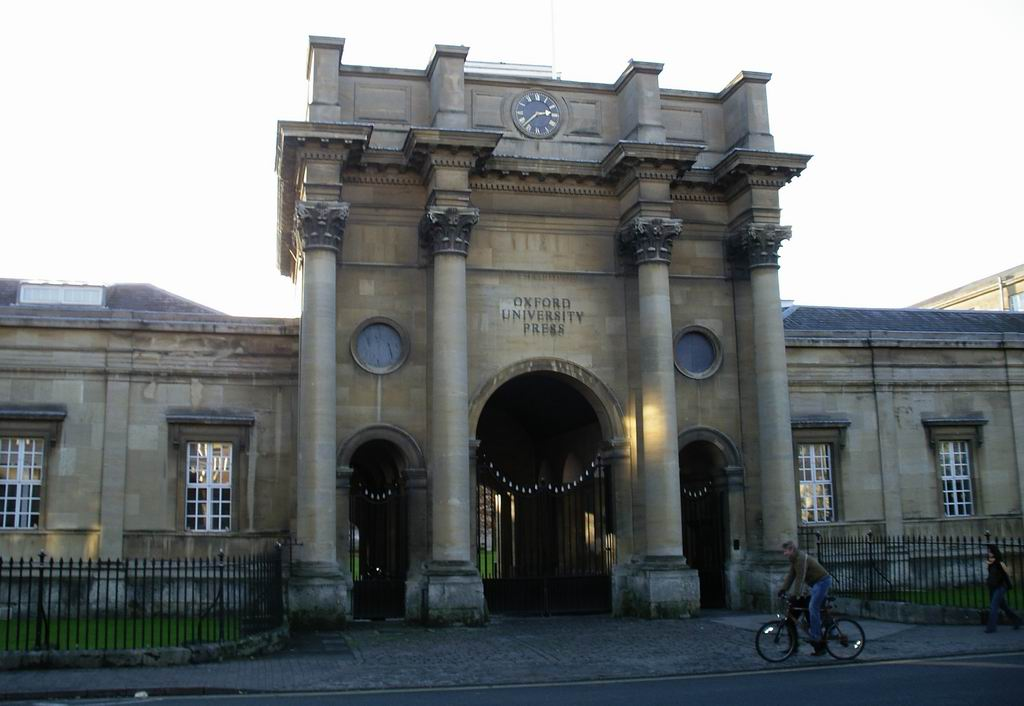
Oxford University Press

(Other than the colleges)

- The Bodleian Library
- The Clarendon Building (often used as a set for film and television)
- The Radcliffe Camera (one of several institutions named after John Radcliffe)
- The Sheldonian Theatre
- The Oxford University Press

== Open spaces ==
The floodplains for Oxford's two rivers reach right into the heart of the city, providing a wealth of green spaces.

- The University Parks
- The University Botanic Garden
- Christ Church Meadow
- Port Meadow
- Mesopotamia – Narrow island that forms part of the University Parks in the English city of Oxford
- Angel & Greyhound Meadow
- Cutteslowe Park
- South Park
- Warneford Meadow

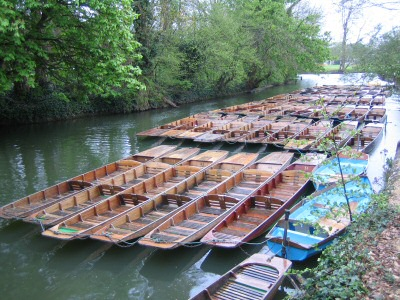
Punts in Oxford

== Theatre ==
- Oxford Playhouse
- North Wall Arts Centre

== See also ==
- Oxford
- Oxford University
