= Marston Road =

Road in east Oxford, England

Coordinates: 51.7612°N 1.2358°W

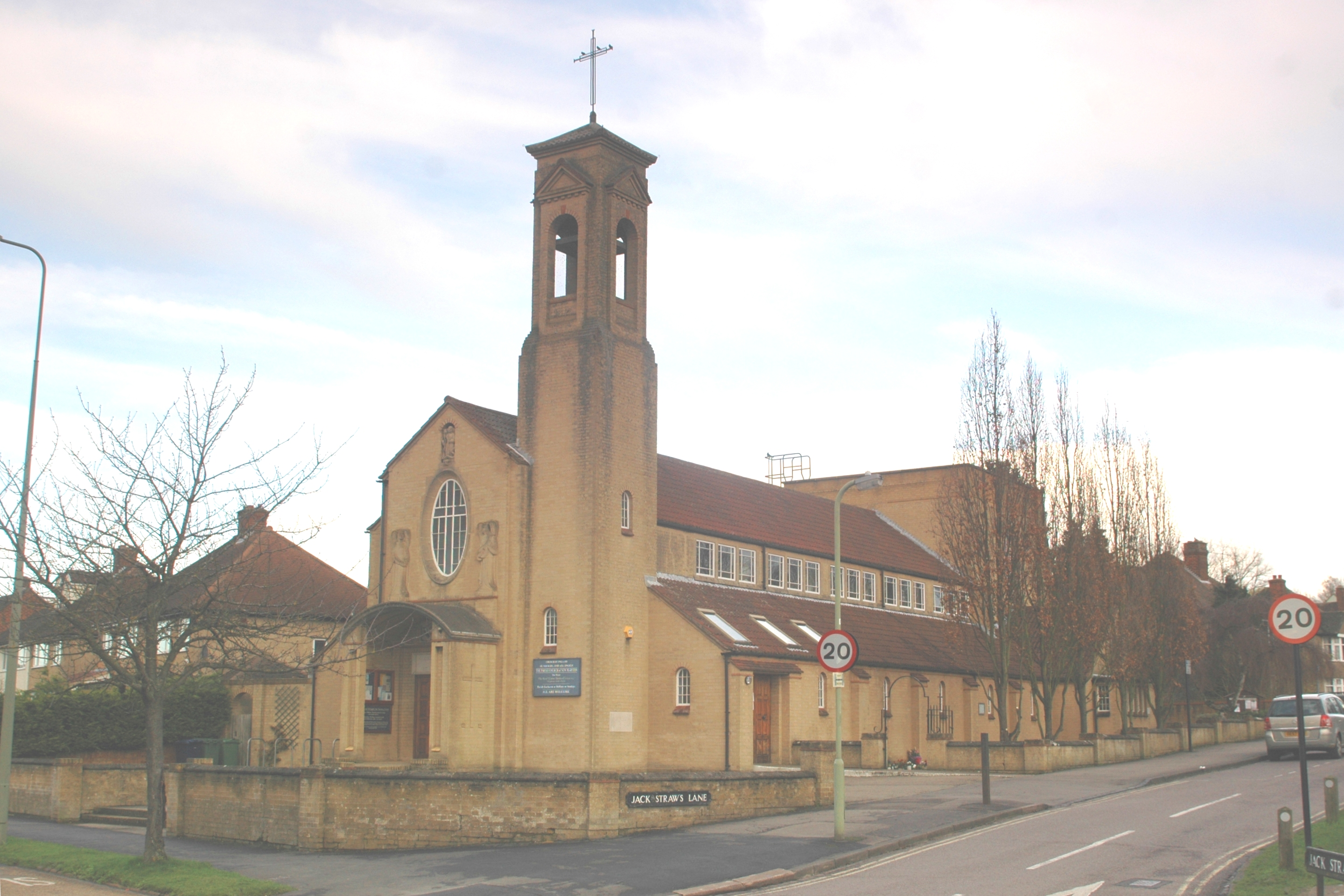
View of St Michael & All Angels Parish Church from Marston Road, at the junction with Jack Straw's Lane.

Marston Road is a road in the east of Oxford, England. It links London Place, the junction of St Clements, the foot of Headington Hill (Headington Road), and Morrell Avenue by South Park to the south with the suburb of New Marston to the north. A mini-roundabout has been replaced by traffic lights and connects with Cherwell Drive and Headley Way at the northern end. To the north is the suburb of Northway. The road is designated the B4150 but this is not shown on signs.

The striking new building for the Oxford Centre for Islamic Studies with its prominent dome and minaret is located on the west side of Marston Road, next to land owned by Magdalen College. There are also Oxford college sport's grounds and a lane linking to Mesopotamia and the University Parks.

St Clement's Church is at the southern end of the road. The original St Clement's Church was located at The Plain near Magdalen Bridge but this was demolished in 1829, after the new church had been built in 1827–28.

Marston United Reformed Church is at 352 Marston Road. The Rivers of Life evangelical church meet here.

== Milham Ford School ==
In the 1930s, Milham Ford School was built on a 16-acre (6.5 ha) site between Marston Road and Harberton Mead, south of Jack Straw's Lane. It opened in 1938, became a girls' grammar school in 1944, and a girls' comprehensive school in 1974. The school was closed in 2003 and was sold. In 2004, the School of Health Care of Oxford Brookes University started to use the building. The green area between the school and Marston Road is now Milham Ford Nature Park.

== Gallery ==
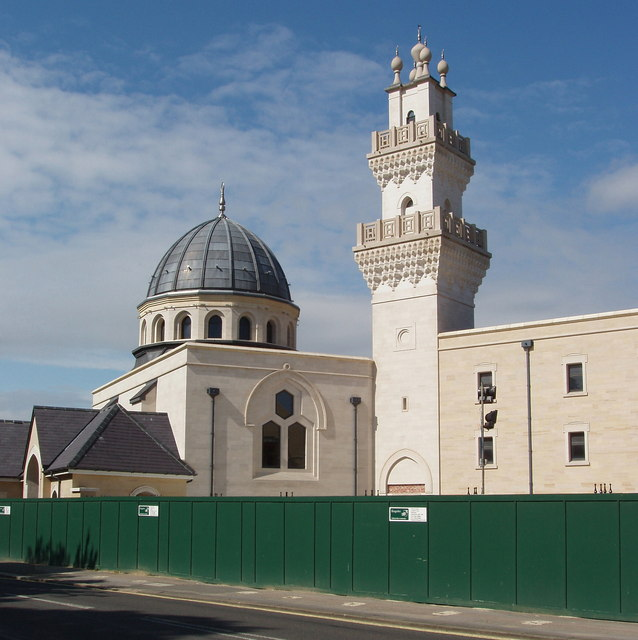
The Oxford Centre for Islamic Studies on Marston Road.

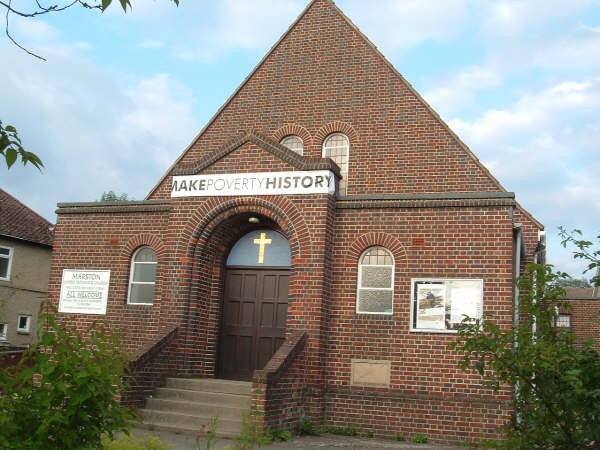
The United Reformed Church at 352 Marston Road.

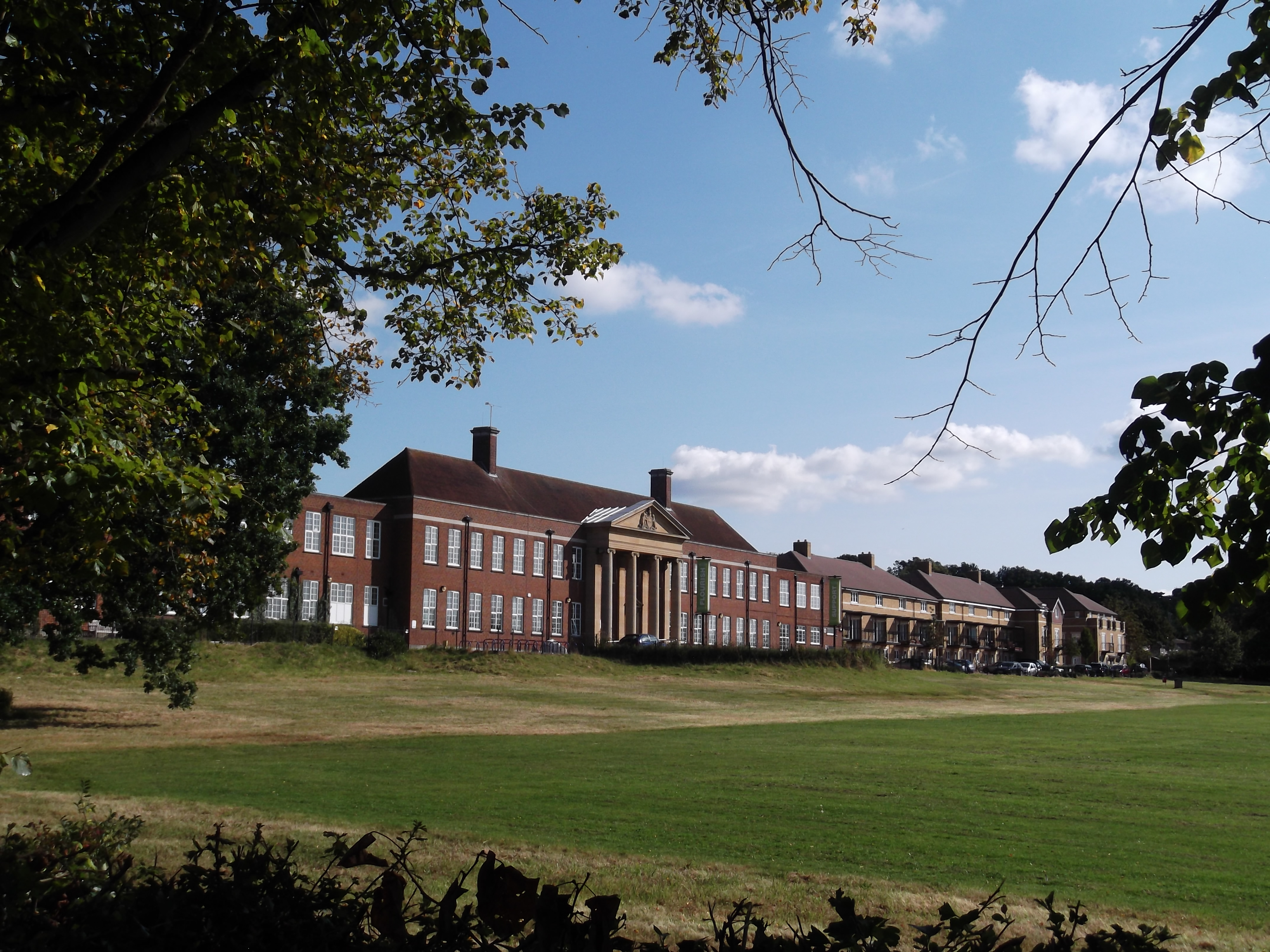
View of the former Milham Ford School building on Marston Road, now used by Oxford Brookes University.
