= Morrell Avenue =

Road in Oxford, England

Coordinates: 51.749677°N 1.231554°W

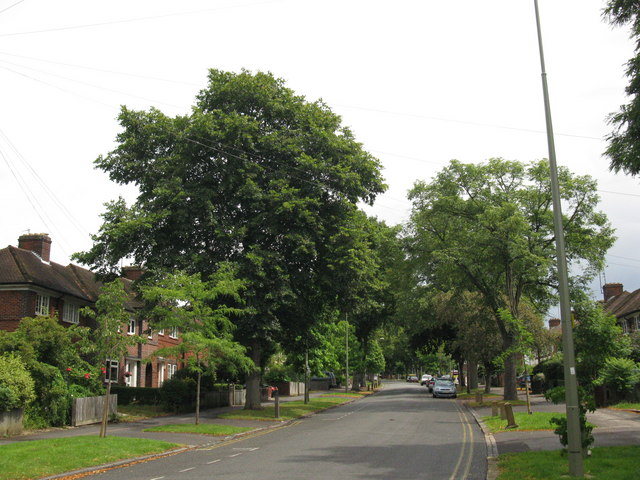
View east along Morrell Avenue.

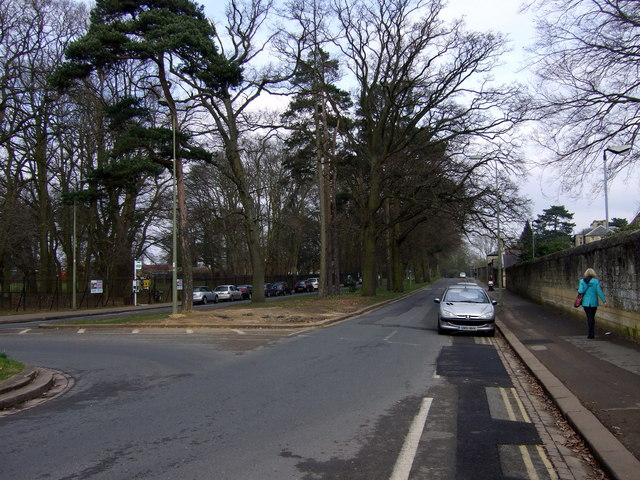
Warneford Lane from the roundabout at the junction with Morrell Avenue.

Morrell Avenue is a residential tree-lined road in eastern Oxford, England, running from St Clement's to Headington.

The road runs east–west in a gentle curve around the southern edge of South Park, south of Headington Hill, rising from west to east. At the western end is a junction with St Clement's (A420), part of the main arterial road leading east out of Oxford. At the eastern end of the road is a roundabout close to Warneford Hospital. It continues as Warneford Lane and there is a junction with Divinity Road to the south. The trees are mainly mature lime trees.

The avenue is named after a local brewery family, the Morrells, who used to live on their estate at Headington Hill Hall to the north, including South Park. It was built in 1929–31, originally with council houses. The architect, Kellett Ablett, started working in the City Engineer's department at Oxford in 1925. The houses were judged to be of high quality for the time, both architecturally and environmentally.

Morrell Avenue is mentioned in a number of books including The Silent Traveller in Oxford, originally published in 1944 and written by the Chinese author Chiang Yee, who lived in Oxford for a while. It is also mentioned in the book Dark Clouds Gather by Katy Sara Culling about mental illness due to Morrell Avenue's proximity to Warneford Hospital, which specialises in mental illness.

On 9 July 2012, the Olympic torch was carried along Morrell Avenue before the London 2012 Olympic Games.

== Oxford Spanish Civil War memorial ==
At the base of Morrell Avenue is the Oxford Spanish Civil War memorial which is dedicated to local residents who travelled to Spain to join the International Brigades to fight against fascist forces backed by Hitler and Mussolini during the Spanish Civil War 1936-1939. The memorial is located where Headington Road meets Morrell Avenue.

During the Spanish Civil War, 29 British people with connections to Oxfordshire joined the International Brigades, with a further 2 who joined POUM. Most of the volunteers were communist activists, and many had links to Britain's Jewish communities. Oxford was a hub for anti-fascist activism, homes within the county housed hundreds of Basque refugee children and various physical fights between anti-fascist activists and the Oxford University Fascist Association.

The memorial was the focus of minor controversy when all plans to have an anti-fascist memorial in the city center were rejected by Oxford city council, until the current site was agreed upon.

== See also ==
- Morrells Brewery

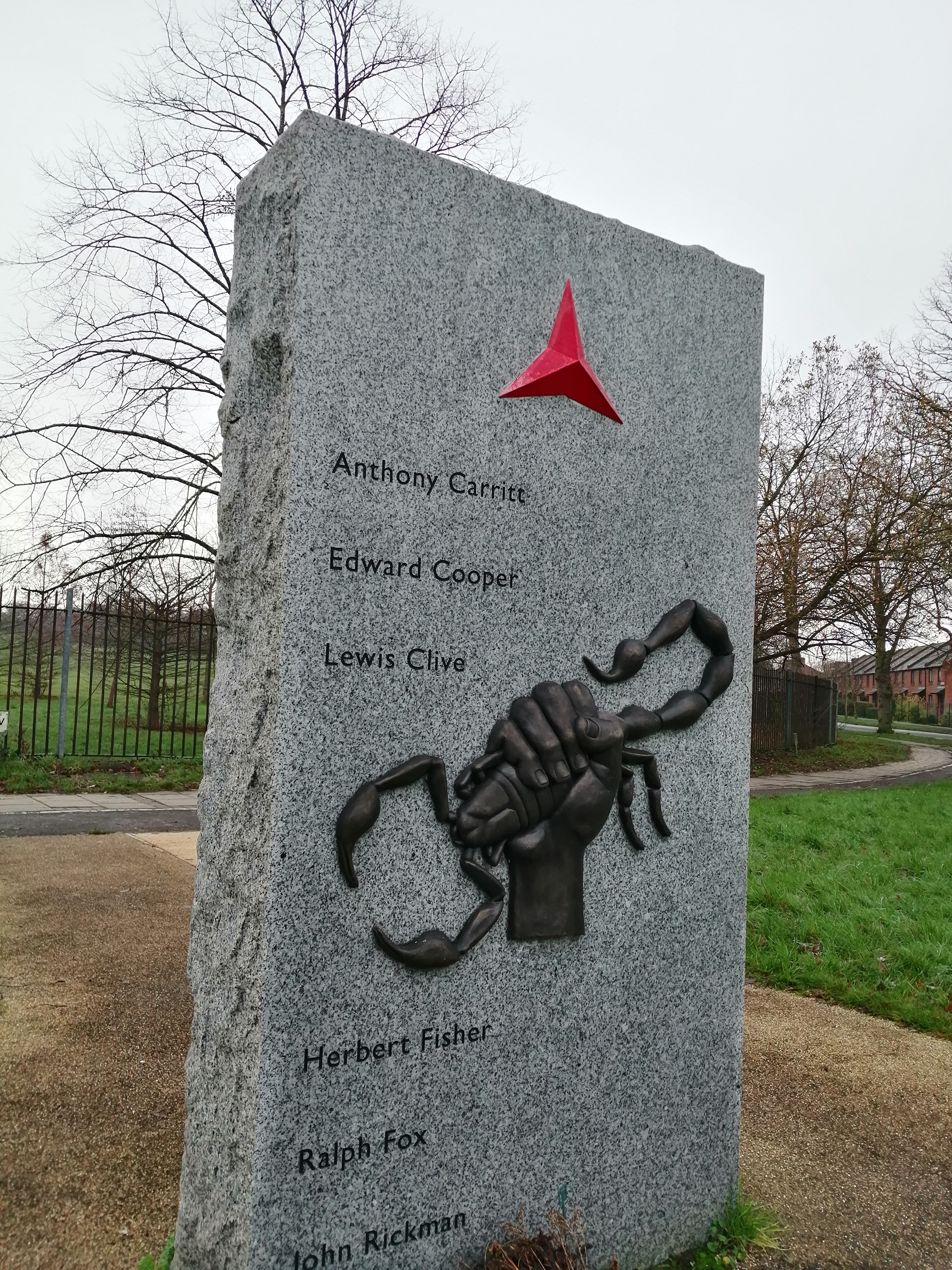
The front of the Oxford Spanish Civil War memorial, erected at the western end of Morrell Avenue
