= Headington Hill Park =

Park in Oxford, England

Coordinates: 51.7545°N 1.2334°W

Headington Hill Park is a park on Headington Hill in the east of Oxford, England.

The park is part of the grounds of Headington Hill Hall, previously owned by the Morrell family, bought by Oxford City Council, and leased to Oxford Brookes University since 1992. The landscaping for the park was originally designed in the 1850s by William Hart Baxter, curator of the Oxford Botanical Garden. The park was bought by the City Council in 1953 and landscaped with trees and ornamental shrubs.

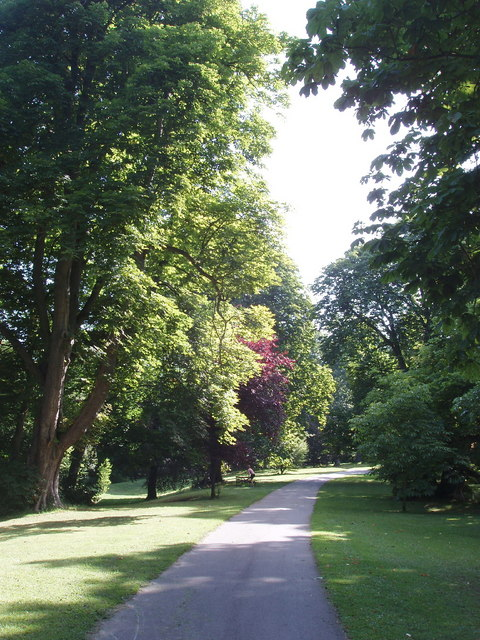
Footpath in Headington Hill Park.

Headington Hill Park is located between the Marston Road and London Road. St Clement's links the park with central Oxford. On the other side of London Road is South Park, also owned by the Morrell family until 1939. Headington Hill Park is connected to South Park via a high-level wrought-iron footbridge over the main London Road up Headington Hill.

The Park includes a carriage road through a striking avenue of limes which runs down to Marston Road. Originally, this allowed the Morrell family to ride down the hill to St Clement's Church, crossing the main road into the church drive which continues the lime tree planting scheme.

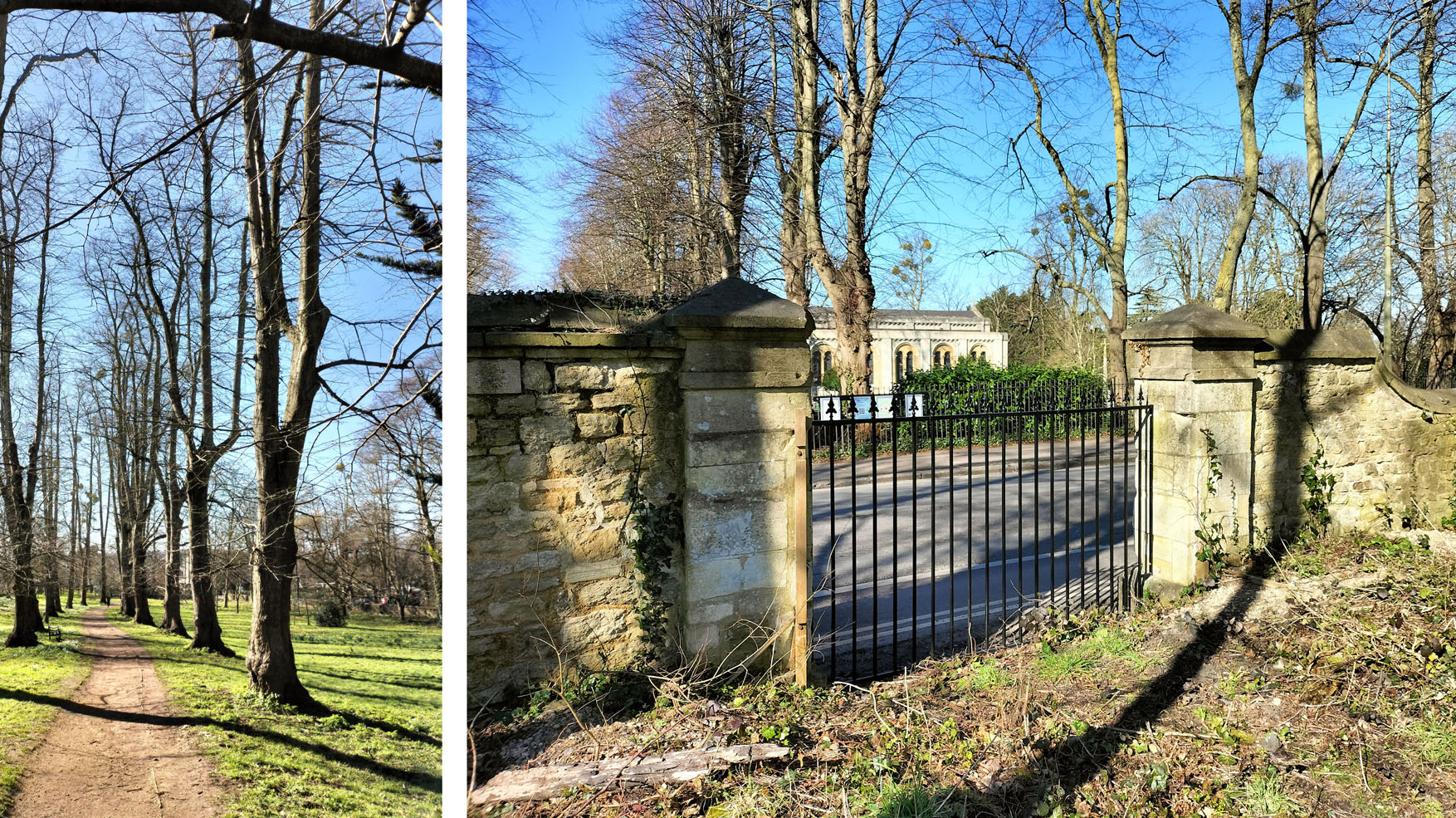
Headington Hill Park - carriage road through lime avenue and exit onto Marston Road

Headington Hill Park has been used for many outside events including Shakespeare plays by Creation Theatre company and from 2012 has been used for wedding receptions.
