= Milham Ford School =

Coordinates: 51°45′43″N 1°13′58″W

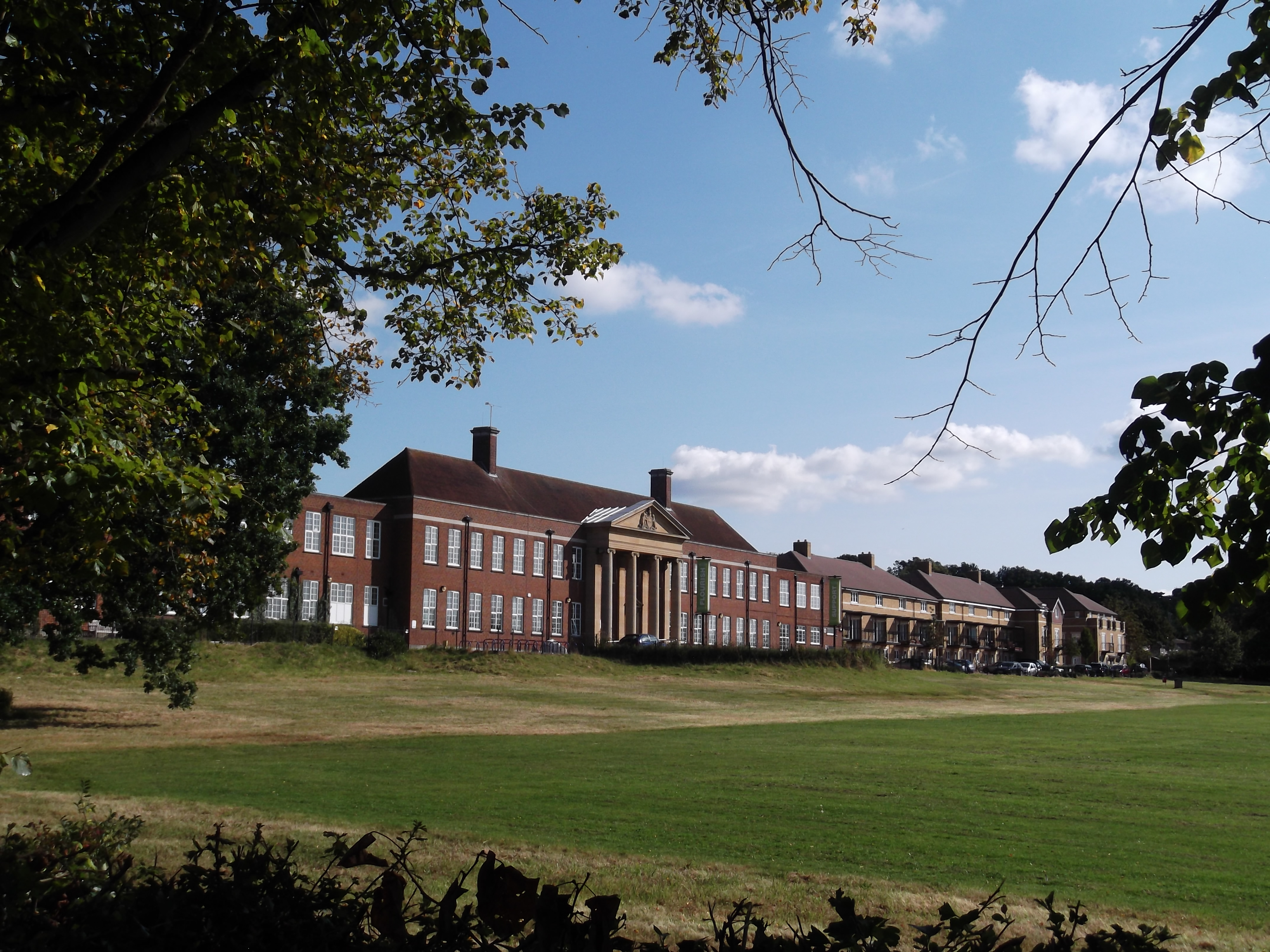
- View of the main building from Jack Straw's Lane

Location
- Harberton Mead; Oxford, United Kingdom, OX3 0DF

Information
- Type: Community school
- Religious affiliation: Church of England
- Established: 1890s
- Closed: 2003
- Department for Education URN: 123249 Tables
- Gender: Girls

Milham Ford School was a girls' secondary school in Oxford, England, located in the suburb of New Marston on Marston Road. It was founded in East Oxford in the 1880s and closed in 2003.

== History ==
The school's origins lie in the 1890s when sisters Emma and Jane Moody started a private nursery school for boys and girls, located in their house in Iffley Road, East Oxford; it seems likely that this was their parent's family home at 7, Iffley Road.

=== Milham Ford Cottages ===
By 1898, the school had moved to a cottage, or group of cottages, in Cowley Place, south of The Plain close to Magdalen Bridge and Magdalen College School.

It was from there that the new girls' school was launched, being named after the Milham Ford that crossed the River Cherwell nearby. It was advertised as "a new day and boarding school for girls" which also took boys up to the age of ten and made "special arrangements" for children under seven.

Fees at the new school were 2 guineas (£2 2s) a term. The initial curriculum, which was described as "thoroughly modern", consisted of English, divinity, mathematics, French, Latin, class singing, drill and needlework; extra fees were charged for French and German conversation, drawing, painting, music and singing.

Mllham Ford School opened to the pupils on 1 May 1899, with Miss Jane Moody as Mistress (Head) and her sister Emma and cousin Talbot Moody as Assistant Mistresses. The first boarders joined in the Autumn Term.

The cottages in Cowley Place appear to have been a combination of school, boarding house and family home; in the 1901 Census, the household consists of the Moody parents, Jane and Emma Moody (schoolmistresses working at home), another 19-year-old schoolmistress, eight boarding pupils, and a domestic servant.

=== Expansion at Cowley Place ===
In 1904, Emma and Jane Moody sold the school to the Church Education Corporation. The Corporation acquired the school in connection with Cherwell Hall, a women's teacher training college which it had established on a neighbouring site in 1900 and the two institutions fell under joint management until 1908. When Miss Dodd took over as headmistress in 1905, Milham was described as consisting of "three picturesque but scholastically inconvenient cottages" and in 1906 the school was rebuilt with a view to accommodating up to 225 pupils; the Corporation also established a boarding house to be "run along Cheltenham lines".

Pupils at this time were taught by a "staff of women graduates" which included student teachers from Cherwell Hall who were expected to spend a term teaching at Milham as part of their practical training; the student teachers were drawn from universities in the United Kingdom, Canada and India. In 1906, The Times reported that the curriculum made special reference to Oxford's historical and literary associations and that each girl had a school garden.

In 1908, Oxford City Council approached Milham as part of its programme to increase the number of secondary places in the City. The management of the school was separated from that of Cherwell Hall and a new board of governors was created. In 1923, the school was sold to the City of Oxford as the Local Education Authority (LEA), as the governors could not meet the cost of further expansion.

After buying the school, the LEA rapidly expanded it by adding huts as extra classrooms. One of these huts was used by Magdalen College School and, in 1957, dismantled and re-erected in Cowley as a band hall for the City of Oxford Silver Band.

In 1939, the school moved to new and larger premises on Marston Road.

The former school premises were used to teach evacuee children during the Second World War and by the Architecture Department of the College of Technology, Art and Commerce (later part of Brookes University) from 1945 to 1958 when it was acquired by St Hilda's College. The Milham Ford Building was demolished in 2018.

==== Boarding house ====
The boarding house built in c.1906 was at 210 and 212 Iffley Road. In 1911, it was home to 7 women, 23 pupils aged 10–18 and 4 female servants of whom three were teenagers . The house was supervised by the House Mistress, Miss Mulliner, and the School Matron. Other residents included two teachers, one a German national. The pupils were mainly from England and Wales, although eight were born overseas including British India, South Africa and Argentina.

=== Harberton Mead ===
The new school was built on a 16-acre (6.5 ha) site on Marston Road between Harberton Mead (which was its address) and Jack Straw's Lane. The original 1906 foundation stone was moved to the new site.

Milham Ford became a girls' grammar school in 1944. In 1948, it was described as a two-form entry school with 380 pupils, but with plans to move to three-form entry. It had grown to 500 pupils by 1959 and 570 by the end of Miss Price's headship in 1966.

It became a girls' comprehensive upper school in September 1973 as part of the City's move to a three-tier comprehensive system, with pupils joining in the third form (Year 8).

In 1976, Milham became caught up in the debate over the controversial sex education film Growing Up (1971) after a number of parents and pupils contacted the National Viewers and Listener's Association. The film had been shown to pupils in biology lessons with the support of the then headmistress, Miss Laws and the majority of the governors.

The school was closed following a return to a two-tier system and the majority of the site was sold in 2003.

The school was sold to Oxford Brookes University in 2003 and the following year it started to be used by its School of Health Care and Social Science. The former playing field area in front of the school is still owned by Oxford City Council and is now Milham Ford Nature Park. In 2006 Brookes sold part of the site to the south for housing; the new streets were named Mary Price Close and McCabe Place in memory of two former headmistresses.

== Headmistresses ==
=== 1890s–1978 ===
Jane Moody (born 1878) and Emma Moody (b. 1880), joint founders. The Moody sisters were the daughters of James Moody, a butler at St John's College, Oxford. Jane Moody was educated at Oxford High School and was Mistress (Headmistress) of Milham from 1899 until the school was sold in 1905 when she became Vice-Principal and Secretary; she is also described at this time as a "Registered Teacher". Jane married in 1909 and by 1911 was living in Camberly, Surrey with her husband and her sister Emma.

Miss MacKenzie-Smith LLA (Hons) (St Andrews) became the first Principal of Cherwell Hall Training College when it was opened in 1902 becoming, additionally Principal of Milham Ford when it was acquired by the Church Education Corporation in 1905. Miss MacKenzie-Smith is described in advertisements as a "sometime student" of Newnham College.

Catherine Isabella Dodd LLA (St Andrews) (1860–1932), principal 1905-1917 and also Principal of Cherwell Hall Training College 1905-1908. Catherine Dodd was an educationist and author with a national reputation whose achievements included being the first female academic on the staff of Victoria University of Manchester.

Joan Stewart Hamon McCabe OBE (c. 1868–1938), vice-headmistress 1912–1917, headmistress 1917–1931. Joan McCabe was born in St Helier, Jersey where she attended Jersey Ladies' College. In 1890, she gained an Intermediate of Arts as an external student of London University. Before moving to Milham, Miss McCabe taught at Cheltenham Ladies' College. She died in January 1938 and is buried at Rose Hill Cemetery, Oxford.

Evelyn Bailey (born 1903), headmistress 1931–1949

Mary Roper Price OBE, MA (Oxon) (1902–2002), headmistress 1949–1966. Mary Price graduated in history from St Anne's College, Oxford and was a respected educator and historian with a commitment to girls' public sector education; she served on a number of national bodies. Mary Price wrote or contributed to several history books including Portrait of Britain and Portrait of Europe (OUP).

Winifred Mary Laws MA (Oxon) (1918–2021), headmistress 1966–1978. Winifred Laws graduated in physics from St Hugh's College Oxford. She entered teaching following war service as an officer in the WAAF's Technical (Radar) Branch, becoming headmistress of Burnley High School for Girls for ten years before moving to Milham in 1966.

=== 1979–2003 ===
- Miss Alice Wakefield 1979 to 1986
- Miss Janet Edwards 1986 to 1987
- Miss Elizabeth Higgins 1987 to 1996
- Mrs Gloria Walker 1996 to 1999
- Mrs Anne Peterson 1999 to 2003

== Notable alumnae ==
- Gertrude Entwisle (1892-1961), engineer, first female student, graduate, and associate member of the Institution of Electrical Engineers.
- Marion Richardson (1892-1946), art teacher. Richardson was a pioneer of a child-centred approach to teaching art and was also active in introducing art classes in prisons. She was the author of Writing and Writing Patterns (1935) and Art and the Child (1948).
- Gladys Fischer (née Munday), MBE (1914-2011), educationist. Gladys Fischer's first job on leaving Milham was as the School's librarian. In 1939, she married and moved to Germany, where she spent the rest of her life. In 1945 she founded the Englishes Institut Heidelberg, and was active in promoting British-German understanding and cultural exchange.
- Olive Gibbs (née Cox), DL (1918-1995), Labour politician, anti-nuclear weapons campaigner and Lord Mayor of Oxford
- Joyce M. Bennett (1923-2015), the first Englishwoman to be ordained a priest in the Anglican Communion was a pupil when her school was evacuated here in 1939 .
- Tamsyn Love Imison (née Trenaman), DBE (1937-2017), educationist
- Elaine Margaret Paintin (1947-2010), historian, archaeologist and arts administrator; former Head of Art at the British Library and drafter of the Treasure Act (1996)
- Jeanetta Laurence OBE (b. 1949), ballet dancer and former Artistic Director of the Royal Ballet
- Isabel and Christine Maxwell (b. 1950). internet entrepreneurs
- Frances O'Grady, Baroness O'Grady of Upper Holloway (b.1959), trade unionist; the first woman to hold the post of Secretary General of the TUC

== Notable staff ==
- Judy Webb MBE BEM, ecologist and conservationist
