= Headington Road =

Road in the east of Oxford, England

Coordinates: 51.753°N 1.234°W

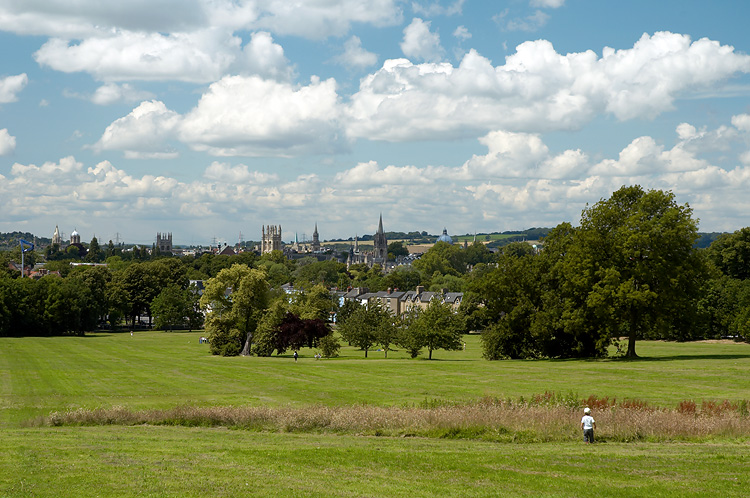
South Park, to the south of Headington Road

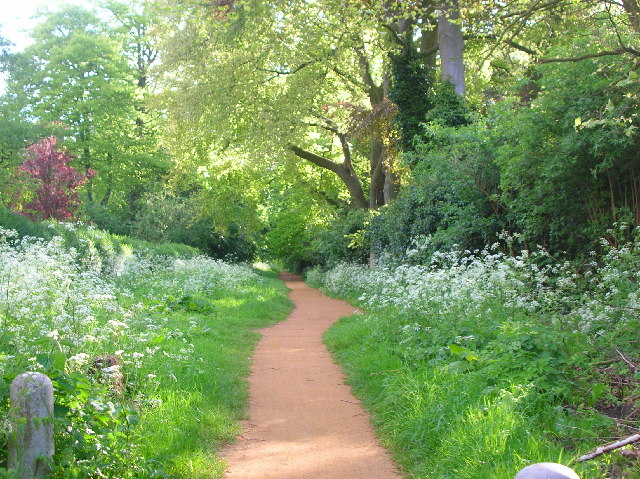
Cuckoo Lane, near Headington Road

Headington Road is an arterial road in the east of Oxford, England. The road connects the junction of St Clements and Marston Road with the suburb of Headington, up Headington Hill. When it reaches the Headley Way junction, it becomes London Road, as the Boundary Brook runs under the road at this point.

To the south is South Park, from which good views of the city centre with its historic university buildings can be seen. Also to the south on Gipsy Lane at the top of Headington Hill is the Headington campus of Oxford Brookes University, originally the Oxford Polytechnic.

Pullens Lane leads off to the north at the top of Headington Hill. Headington Hill Hall, built in 1824 for the Morrell family, local brewers, is nearby, with its associated Headington Hill Park bordering Headington Road to the north.

The road is designated the A420.

== History ==
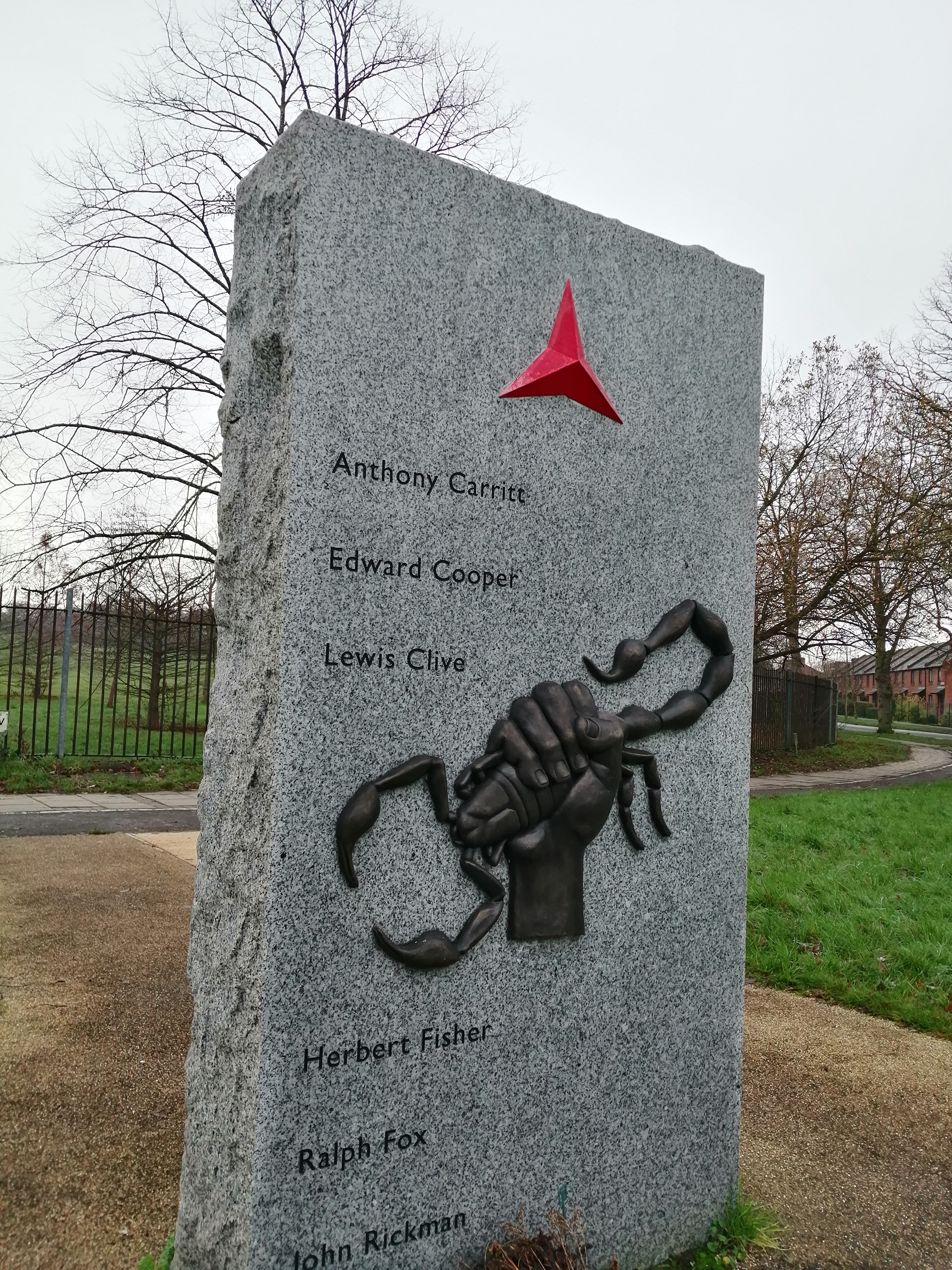
Located on Headington Road is the Oxford Spanish Civil War memorial, dedicated to Oxford residents who joined the International Brigades during the Oxford Spanish Civil War memorial and died fighting against fascist forces backed by Hitler and Mussolini.

The road did not exist until 1775, when it was cut through the countryside as part of the scheme to replace the old route from Oxford to London (via Cheney Lane, Old Road, Shotover, and Wheatley) by a new road via Stokenchurch. Until that date, the road at the top of Headington Hill turned left into Cuckoo Lane, the former road to Old Headington.

== Spanish Civil War memorial ==
Headington Road is the home of the Oxford Spanish Civil War memorial which is dedicated to local residents who travelled to Spain to join the International Brigades to fight against fascist forces backed by Hitler and Mussolini during the Spanish Civil War (1936-1939).

During the Spanish Civil War, 29 British people with connections to Oxfordshire joined the International Brigades, with a further two who joined POUM. Plans to have an anti-fascist memorial in the city centre were rejected by Oxford City Council.
