= Jack Straw's Castle =

Jack Straw's Castle may refer to:

- a place associated with Jack Straw's Lane, Oxfordshire
- Jack Straw's Castle, Hampstead
