= Jack Straw's Lane =

Street in Oxford, United Kingdom

Coordinates: 51.7631°N 1.2309°W

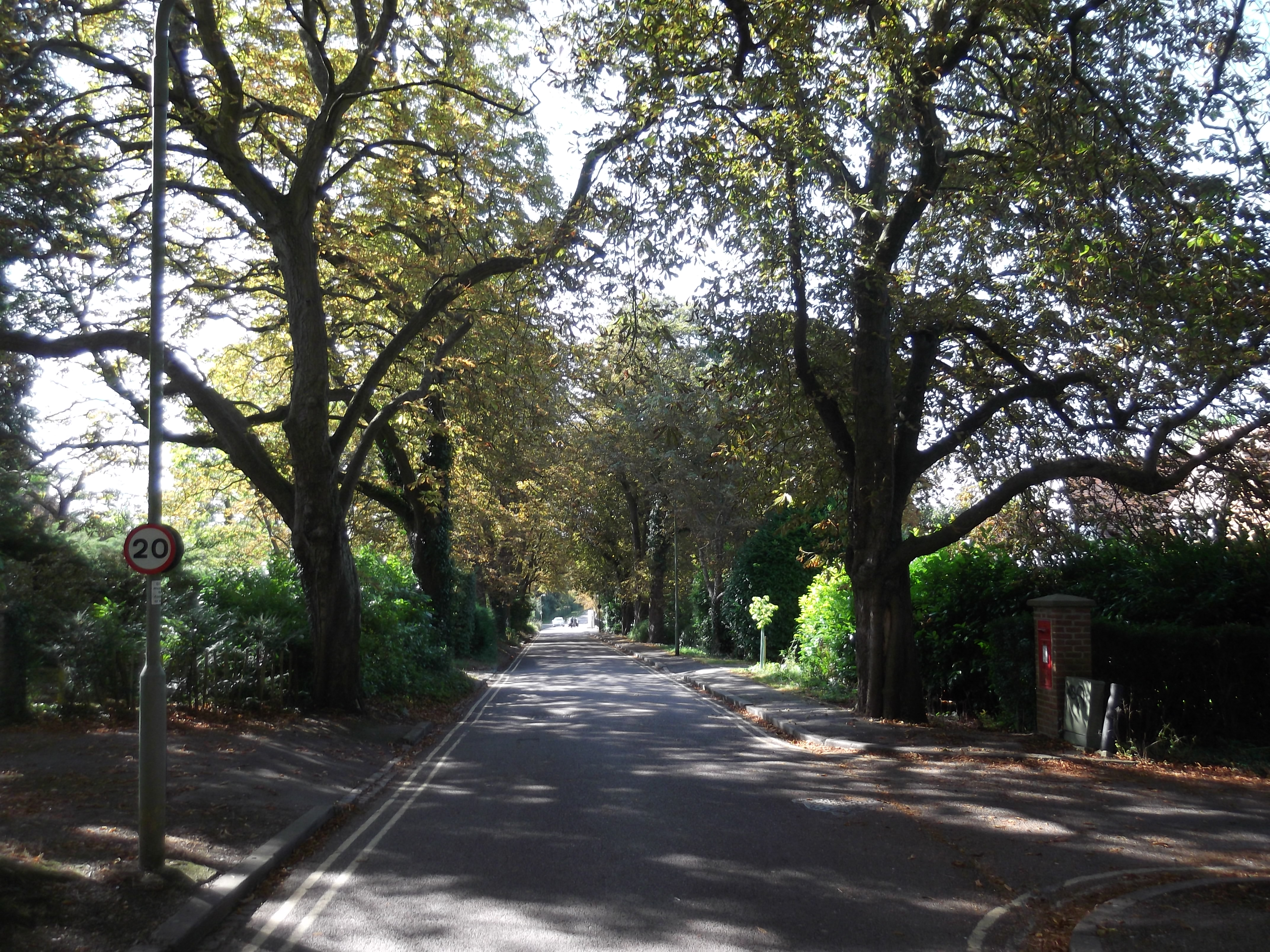
View west down Jack Straw's Lane.

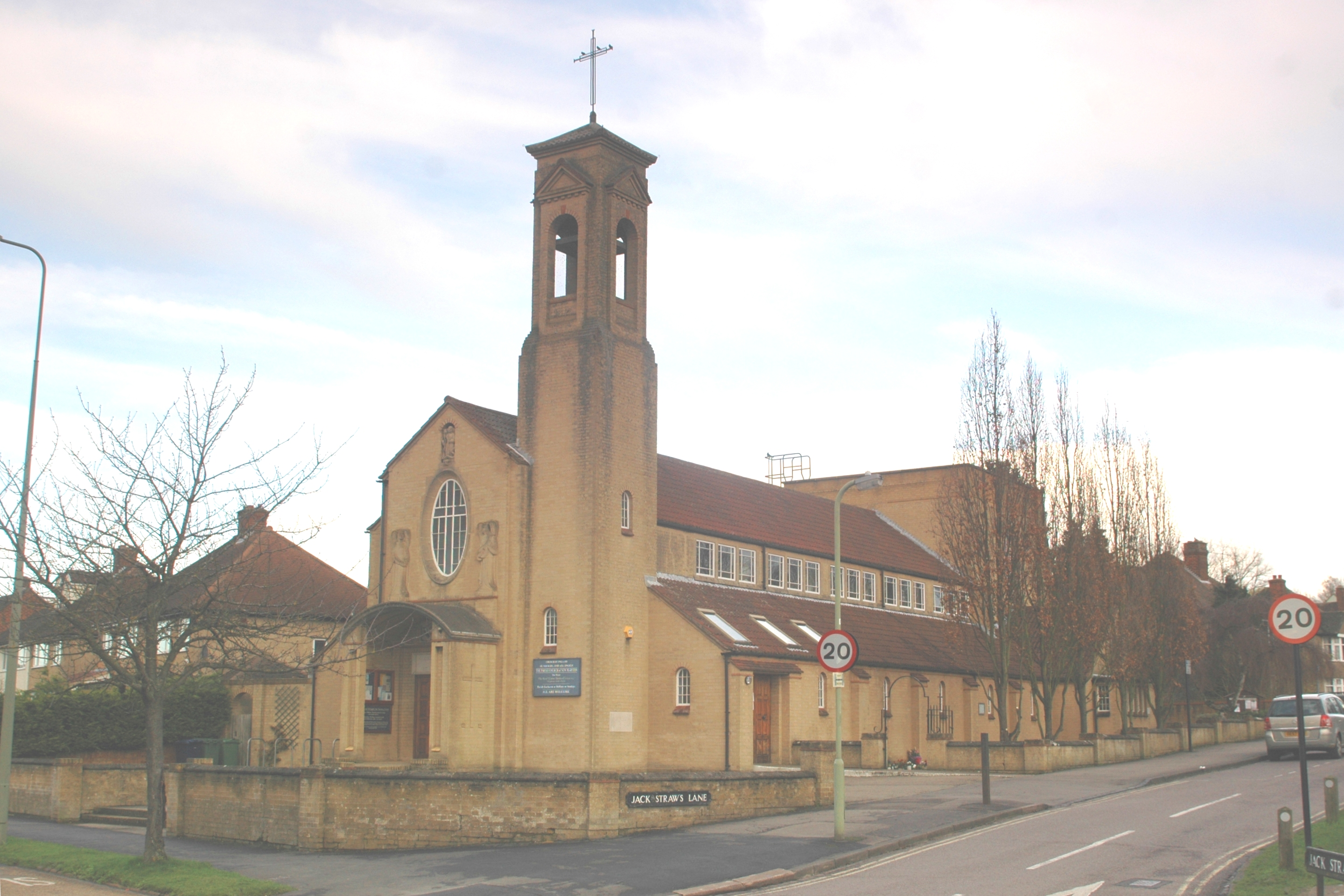
View of St Michael & All Angels Parish Church from the southwest, on the corner of Jack Straw's Lane with Marston Road.

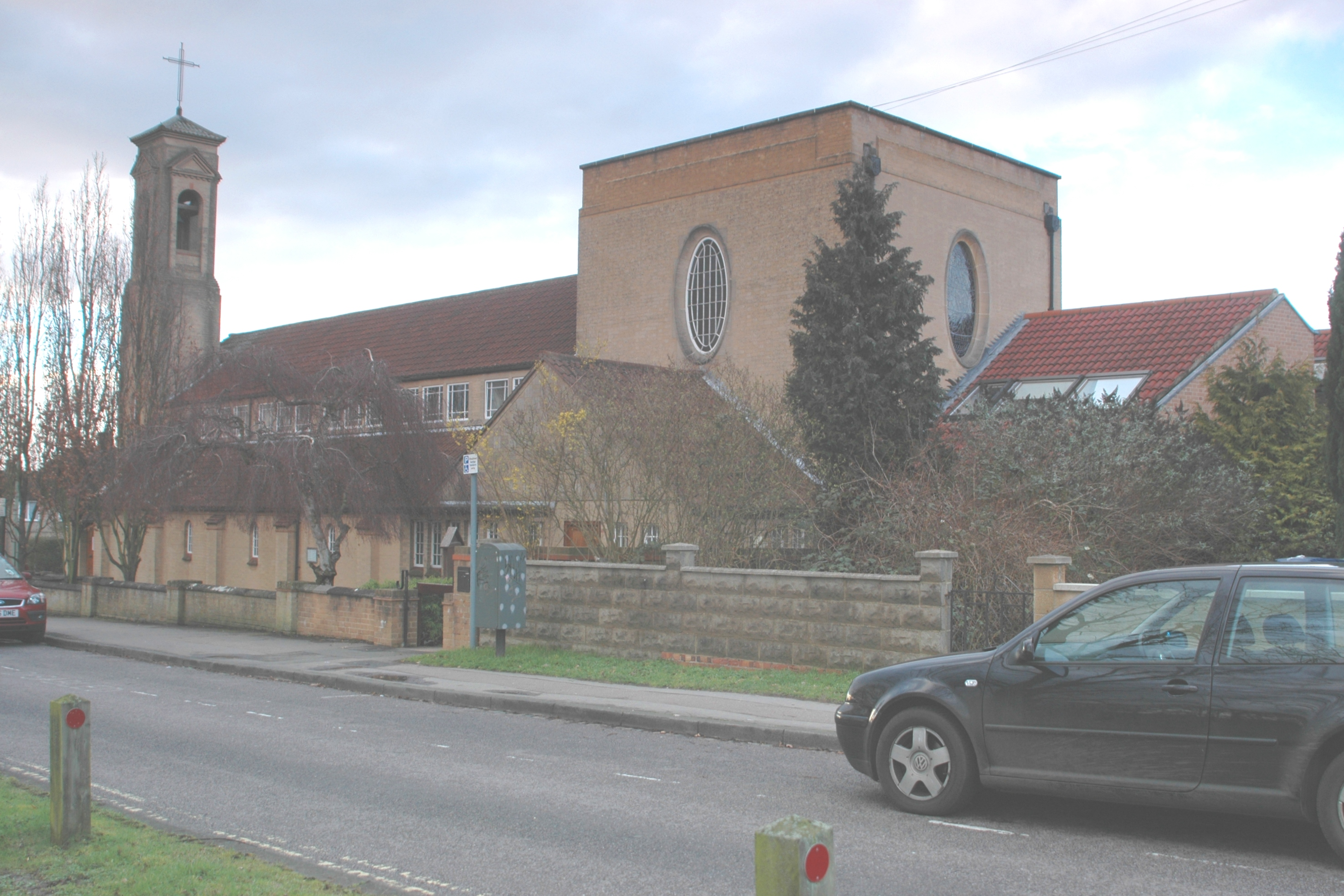
Alternative view of St Michael & All Angels Parish Church from the southeast, on Jack Straw's Lane.

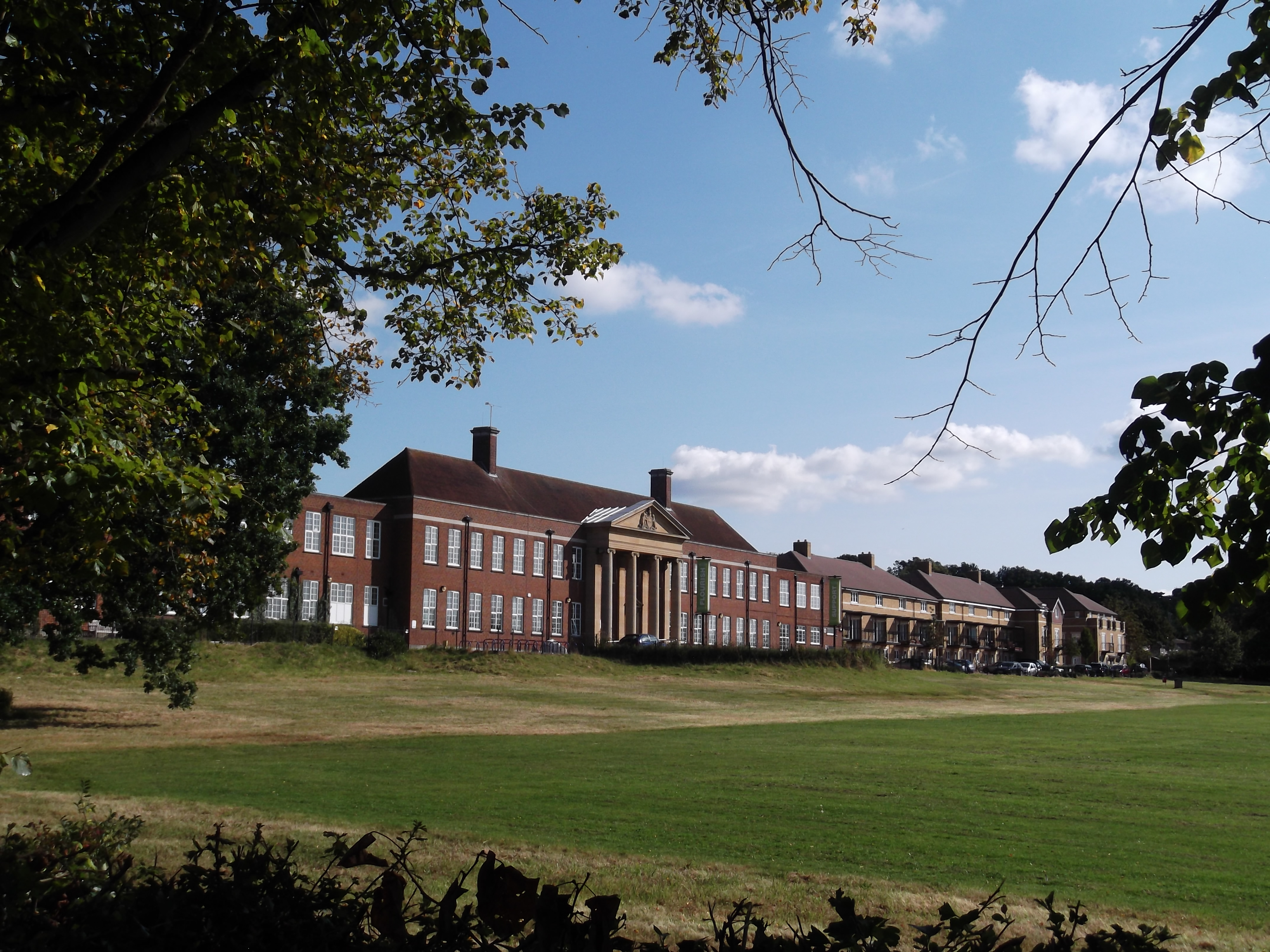
View of the former Milham Ford School building from Jack Straw's Lane, now used by Oxford Brookes University.

Jack Straw's Lane is a residential road in Oxford, England. It runs between the north end of Pullens Lane on Headington Hill and Marston Road.

== History ==
The land east of the Marston Road was part of Headington until the 20th century and was thus in the parish of St Andrew's Church. Under the Headington Enclosure Award of 1804–5, the Lord of the manor of Headington acquired a 280-acre (1.1 km^{2}) plot that included the whole of Jack Straw's Lane. Jack Straw's Farmhouse, also known as Jack Straw's Castle, lay to the north of the lane, along with a brickworks between the farmhouse and the Marston Road. Until the 20th century, the lane had no name. It was originally a track at the end of Pullens Lane that led to the farmhouse. The name of the road dates from at least 1932 and the road was official adopted in 1954.

In 1898, Cowley House (now a children's nursery) together with Cowley Cottage were built on the south side of the lane. Subsequently, other large houses were built on the lane, with a rural feel but close to central Oxford.

== Name ==
Jack Straw is traditionally supposed to have been a farmer who lived on Headington Hill. Although many highwaymen were active in this area, no leader was ever found. However, when Jack Straw died, the cellar underneath his farm kitchen contained expensive goods stolen from merchants and travellers. The name has nothing to do with the Labour politician and former Justice Secretary Jack Straw. The name dates from at least 1932, although it was not officially adopted until 1954.

== Milham Ford School ==
In the 1930s, Milham Ford School was built on a 16-acre (65,000 m^{2}) site between Jack Straw's Lane and Harberton Mead. It opened in 1938, became a girls' grammar school in 1944, and a girls' comprehensive school in 1974. The school was closed in 2003 and was sold. In 2004, the School of Health Care and Social Science of Oxford Brookes University started to use the building. This became the Faculty of Health and Life Sciences.

== Today ==
Jack Straw's Lane is a residential area with houses on large plots and with high prices. The lane is lined with large mature trees. The University of Oxford runs a day nursery, the Jack Straws Lane Nursery, located at 32b Jack Straw's Lane.
