= Catherine Isabella Dodd =

English academic, novelist and education writer

Catherine Isabella or Isabel Dodd (8 April 1860 – 13 November 1932) was an English academic, novelist and education writer. In 1892 she became the first woman on the academic staff of Victoria University of Manchester, as a lecturer in education.

== Background ==
Catherine Dodd was born in Birmingham, the only daughter among four children of the businessman Thomas Milner Dodd and his wife Christian (née Kelly). She attended a private girls' school and then studied elementary education at Swansea Training College.

== Career ==
Dodd taught initially at several schools, and from 1892 at Owens College, part of Victoria University of Manchester, as "first mistress of method". This made her the first female member of the university's staff. A student of hers at the time recalled, "She made us enthusiastic about our profession, giving us ideals to strive for, and above all others, deserves the title of pioneer." A colleague of hers at Owens College, Samuel Alexander, interviewed much later, said Dodd had "swept her students into the whirlwind of her own energy and enthusiasm and faith in the value of pedagogy."

In 1903, Dodd founded privately in Manchester the experimental College House School, based on Froebel principles, which also embraced ideas from the German educational philosopher Johann Friedrich Herbart (1776–1841). Her publications in that period included Introduction to the Herbartian Principles of Teaching (1898), which remains in print, Hungarian Education (1902), Fairy Tales for Infant Schools and Infant Classes (1904), and The Child and the Curriculum (1906), also still in print. She pioneered the use of school travel as an educational tool. Dodd moved to Oxford in 1905 to be Principal of Cherwell Hall teacher training college and headmistress of Milham Ford School. She retired from the school in 1917 and the college in 1920.

== Novelist ==
Retirement in Dodd's case meant a new career as a novelist. Basing herself in London, she wrote twelve novels, starting from A Vagrant Englishwoman (1905) and finishing with Paul and Perdita (1932). These mingled mysticism with idealization of the historical past. They reflect something of a shift from the Fabian and feminist ideas of her younger days to a more conservative outlook.

She also wrote a biography of Mary Shelley, entitled Eagle Feather (1933).

== Endowment ==
Catherine Dodd remained unmarried. She died in London on 13 November 1932 and was buried in Marylebone Cemetery. She had in 1931 endowed a fellowship at the University of Manchester and left bequests to several literary organizations in her will.

== Sources ==
- A. Robertson: "Catherine I. Dodd and innovation in teacher training, 1892–1905" Bulletin of the History of Education Society (Spring 1991, No. 47), pp. 32–41
- Edith Caroline Wilson: Catherine Isabella Dodd, 1860–1932: a memorial sketch (London: Sidgwick & Jackson, 1936)
