= Arthur Kerry =

English footballer

Personal information
- Full name: Arthur Henry Gould Kerry
- Date of birth: 21 July 1879
- Place of birth: Headington, England
- Date of death: 1967 (aged 87–88)
- Position: Outside left

Senior career*
| Years | Team | Apps | (Gls) |
| | Tottenham Hotspur | 0 | (0) |
- Oxford City
| 1909 | Tottenham Hotspur | 1 | (0) |
- Oxford University
- * Club domestic league appearances and goals

Arthur Henry Gould Kerry (21 July 1879 – 1967) was an English professional footballer who played for Oxford City, Tottenham Hotspur and Oxford University.

== Football career ==
Kerry began his playing career at Tottenham Hotspur without playing a first team game in his first spell at the club. He went on to join Oxford City before re-joining Tottenham in 1909. The outside left made one appearance for the Lilywhites. Kerry ended his career playing for the Oxford University football side.
