= Warneford Meadow =

Grassland in Oxfordshire, England

Coordinates: 51°44′57″N 1°13′09″W

Two wooden posts in Warneford Meadow.

Warneford Meadow is an area of 20 acres (8.1 ha) of natural grassland immediately south-east of the Warneford Hospital, in Headington, east Oxford, England. The Warneford Meadow is a wild space within urban Oxford. The area has been used by local residents as a public space for recreation for over 50 years.

== History ==
Warneford Meadow was purchased in 1918 by the Warneford Hospital, a psychiatric hospital, following the sale of the adjacent Southfield Farm. The purchase was funded by public subscription, with the aim of providing natural green space for the psychological benefit of patients and the local community. Archaeological trenching performed in 2006 suggested a Roman or pre-Roman settlement, or area of pottery production, in the area of the present meadow.

== Geography ==
Warneford Meadow in summer.

Access to the Meadow is gained from either a lane off Hill Top Road, beside the Southfield Park Golf Club, or Roosevelt Drive opposite the 'Little Oxford' housing development (beside the Headington Care Home). The Meadow slopes gradually down from the Hill Top Road end, towards the Boundary Brook, which runs between the Meadow and the Churchill Hospital to the East. Several public paths run across the Meadow. South of the Meadow is the Southfield Park Golf Club and the Meadow is bounded to the west by homes on Hill Top Road. Warneford Meadow also includes an orchard, on the northern border of the Meadow with the Warneford Hospital.

== Biodiversity ==
The Meadow contains species of butterfly, invertebrates, and birds including skylarks and kingfishers. The Meadow forms part of the 'green corridor' which links South Park to the Thames via Boundary Brook. The Meadow's border hedges include blackberries. The Warneford Orchard on the northern edge of the Meadow is over 50 years old and has varieties of apple including the Russian Emperor Alexander. Owls, bats, and badgers are also found in the orchard.

== Development ==
Sunrise over the Warneford Meadow in winter.

Development of the Meadow is permitted under the Oxford Local Plan 2001–2016. The Oxfordshire & Buckinghamshire Mental Health Partnership NHS Trust (OBMH) submitted two outline planning applications in July 2006, regarding the Meadow. The primary reason for the development, stated by the OBMH management, was the desire to generate capital for the Trust, in order to upgrade patient facilities. In answer to a parliamentary question about the assets of the United Kingdom's NHS as a whole Liam Byrne, the Parliamentary Under-Secretary of State at the Department of Health, revealed that the 'surplus' land at the Warneford Hospital was worth £30,900,000.

The plans for development met with substantial opposition from local residents, led by nearby Residents Associations and the action group 'Friends of Warneford Meadow'.

An application to have the land registered as a Town or Village Green (under section 22 of the Commons Registration Act 1965, amended by section 98 of the Countryside and Rights of Way Act 2000). was launched in December 2006. The application was successful, and Warneford Meadow was designated as a Town Green in April 2009. Oxfordshire and Buckinghamshire Mental Health NHS Foundation Trust challenged the decision in the High Court; the action commenced in February 2010. In March 2010 the High Court upheld the original decision to register the meadow as a Town Green.

== Gallery ==
Boundary Brook and surrounding fields at around the time the Meadow became part of the Warneford Hospital.

Lye Valley near the Meadow during the same time period.

Warneford Hospital map from 1899, the Meadow is just to the south-east of the Hospital.
