= Jeanetta Laurence =

Former director of The Royal Ballet

Jeanetta Christine Laurence OBE (born December 1949) is the former associate director of The Royal Ballet. She was artistic administrator from 1990, assistant director from 2003 and associate director from 2009 to 2014.

Jeanetta Laurence was born in Oxford, trained at The Royal Ballet School. She rose to be a soloist with The Royal Ballet and created roles in works by Jack Carter, Ronald Hynd, Joe Layton, Lynn Seymour and others.

Laurence was appointed an Officer of the Order of the British Empire (OBE) in the 2015 New Year Honours, "for services to dance".
