= Headington =

Suburb of Oxford, England

Coordinates: 51.765°N 1.212°W

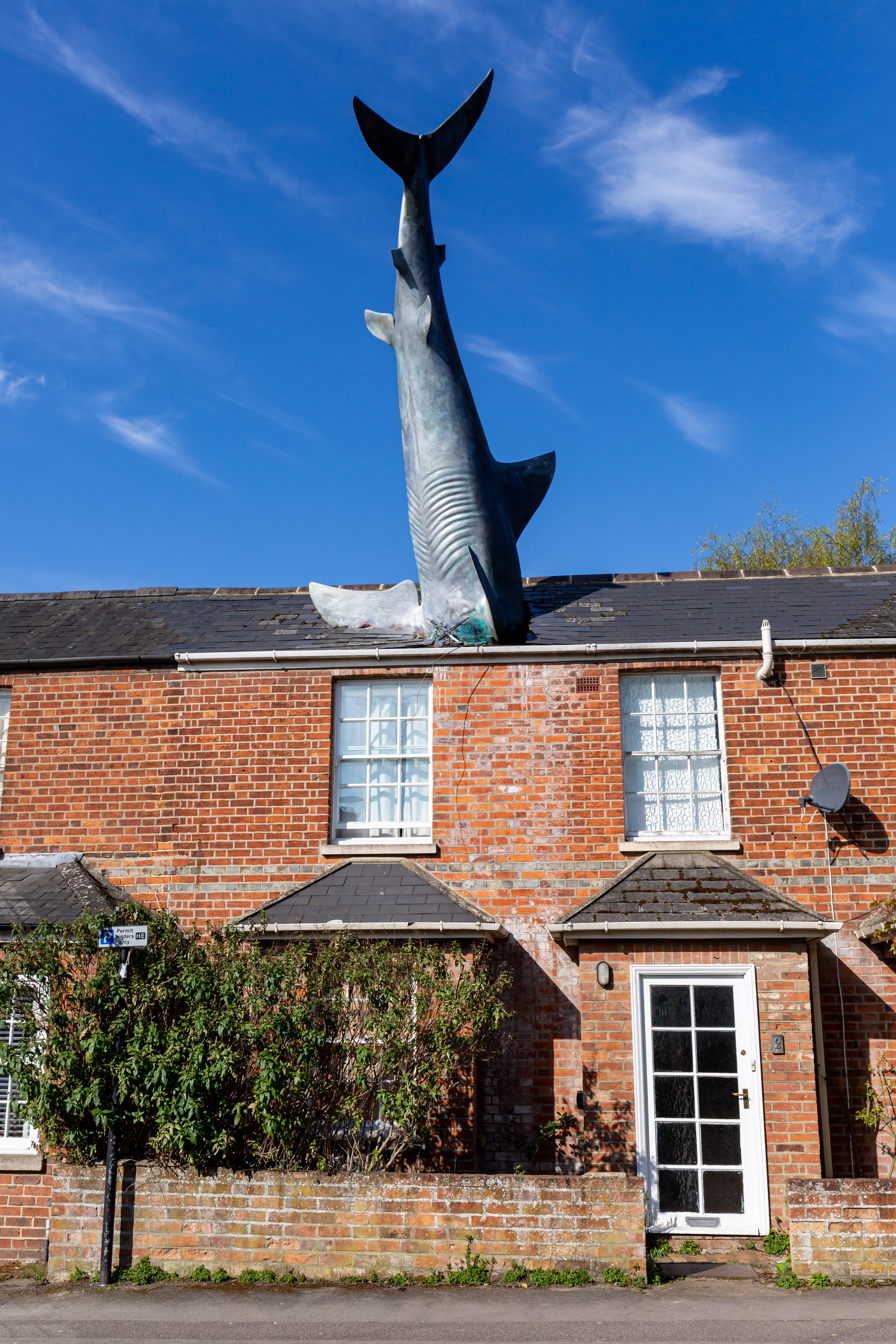
- The Headington Shark

- Location within Oxfordshire
- OS grid reference: SP5407
- District: Oxford
- Shire county: Oxfordshire
- Region: South East
- Country: England
- Sovereign state: United Kingdom
- Post town: Oxford
- Postcode district: OX3
- Dialling code: 01865
- Police: Thames Valley
- Fire: Oxfordshire
- Ambulance: South Central
- UK Parliament: Oxford East
- Website: www.headington.org.uk

Headington is an eastern suburb of Oxford, in the county of Oxfordshire, England. It is at the top of Headington Hill overlooking the city in the Thames valley below, and bordering Marston to the north-west, Cowley to the south, and Barton and Risinghurst to the east. The life of the large residential area is centred upon London Road, the main road between London and Oxford.

== History ==
The site of Headington shows evidence of continued occupation from the Stone Age, as the 2001 field excavations in Barton Lane found, suggesting a date in the 11th century BC. Pottery was found on the Manor Ground, suggesting an Iron Age settlement there in the 7th century BC. Roman kilns from about 300 have been found, including one now on display at the Museum of Oxford. Anglo-Saxon burial remains from about 500 have also been discovered. Headington's toponym is derived from the Old English Hedena's dun, meaning "Hedena's hill", when it was the site of a palace or hunting lodge of the Kings of Mercia. In a charter of 1004, Æthelred the Unready, "written at the royal ville called Headan dune", gave land in Headington to St Frideswide's Priory, which included the quarry and the area around it.

Henry I granted a chapel at Headington to the Augustinian canons regular of St Frideswide's Priory, when the priory was founded in 1122. The parish church of Saint Andrew was built in the middle of the 12th century and enlarged in the 13th century. The bell tower was started in the 13th or 14th century and completed in about 1500. St. Andrew's was repaired in the 17th and 18th centuries. The Gothic Revival architect J.C. Buckler restored the building and lengthened the nave in 1862–1864.

Headington developed rapidly in the early 20th century, significant amounts of housing developing around the medieval village, now known as Old Headington, around the original parish church of St Andrew. New Headington refers to some of the area on the south side of the London Road, originating as a late 19th-century suburb. Other neighbourhoods of the modern Headington suburb include Highfield, Quarry, and Headington Hill.

The City of Oxford Silver Band began as the Headington Brass Band having been founded in the 19th century. In 2002 a re-warding of the City created a ward called Headington representing both sides of the London Road, from Bury Knowle Park to Headley Way, with two elected representatives. The first councillors for this ward were David Rundle (2002–2014) and Stephen Tall (2002–2008). Ruth Wilkinson was elected to succeed Stephen Tall in May 2008, and Mohammed Altaf-Khan to succeed David Rundle in 2014.

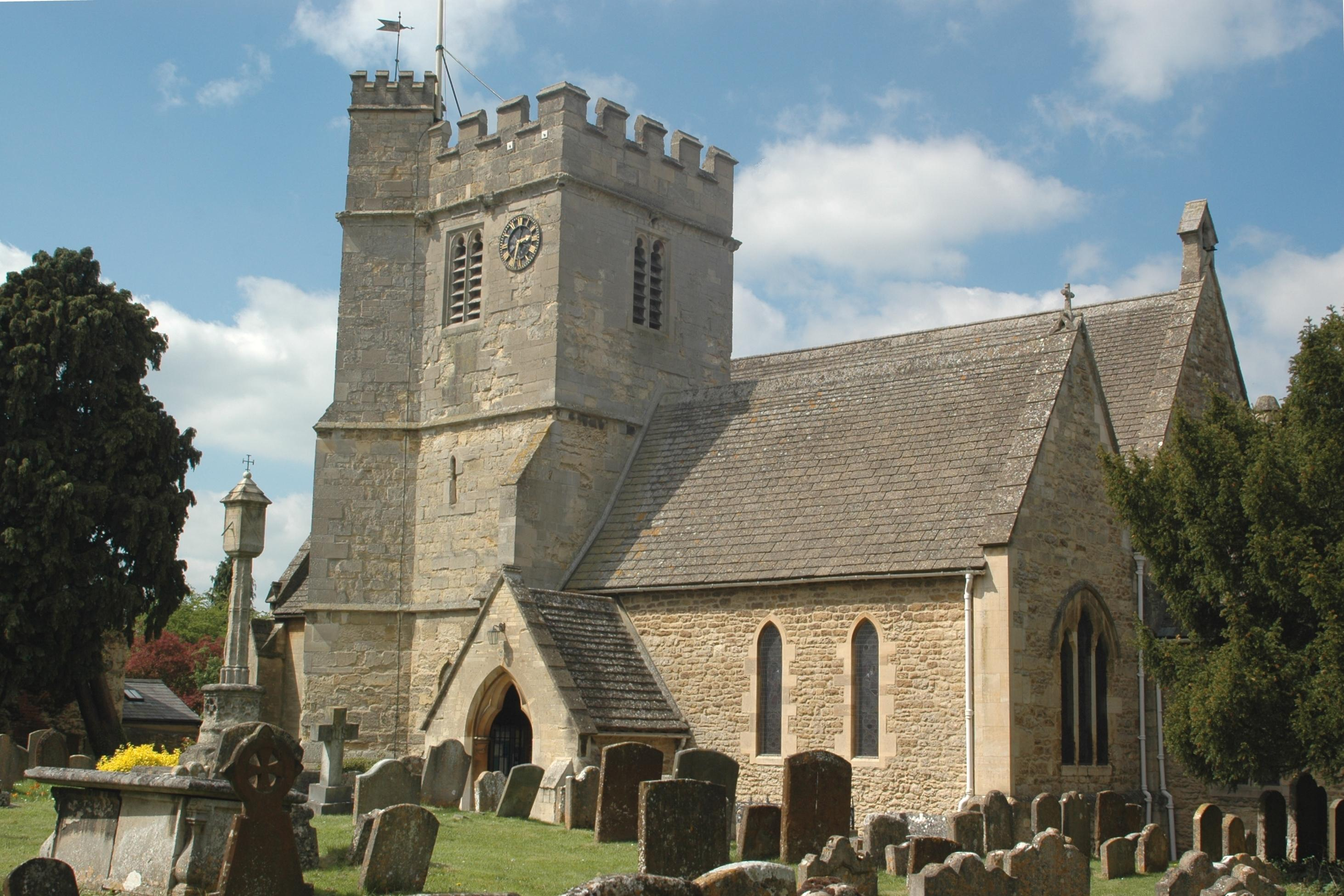
Church of England parish church of St Andrew in Old Headington

=== Administrative history ===
Headington was an ancient parish in the Bullingdon Hundred of Oxfordshire. In 1868, an area on the western edge of the parish around Headington Hill was included in the Oxford constituency, and in 1889 the same area was added to the city and municipal borough of Oxford. The civil parish of Headington was reduced to just cover the area outside the borough of Oxford in 1894. At the same time, Headington was given a parish council and included in the Headington Rural District.

The parish of Headington was removed from the rural district and converted into an urban district in 1927. It was only an urban district for two years; in 1929 the civil parish and urban district of Headington was abolished. Most of the area was absorbed into Oxford, including the original village. Some of the more rural edges of the old parish were transferred to the neighbouring parishes of Horspath, Forest Hill with Shotover, Elsfield, and Stowood (the latter becoming part of Beckley and Stowood in 1932). In 1921 (the last census before the civil parish was abolished) it had a population of 5,328.

== Headington today ==
Headington has a large and growing population. Headington's main employment sectors are medicine, education, and research. In the centre of Headington are a number of shops, pubs, cafés, restaurants, and other services. The area also includes the main campus of Oxford Brookes University, Ruskin College (which moved in its entirety from central Oxford to its Headington site in 2012), and the city's main hospitals, including the John Radcliffe, Nuffield and Churchill.

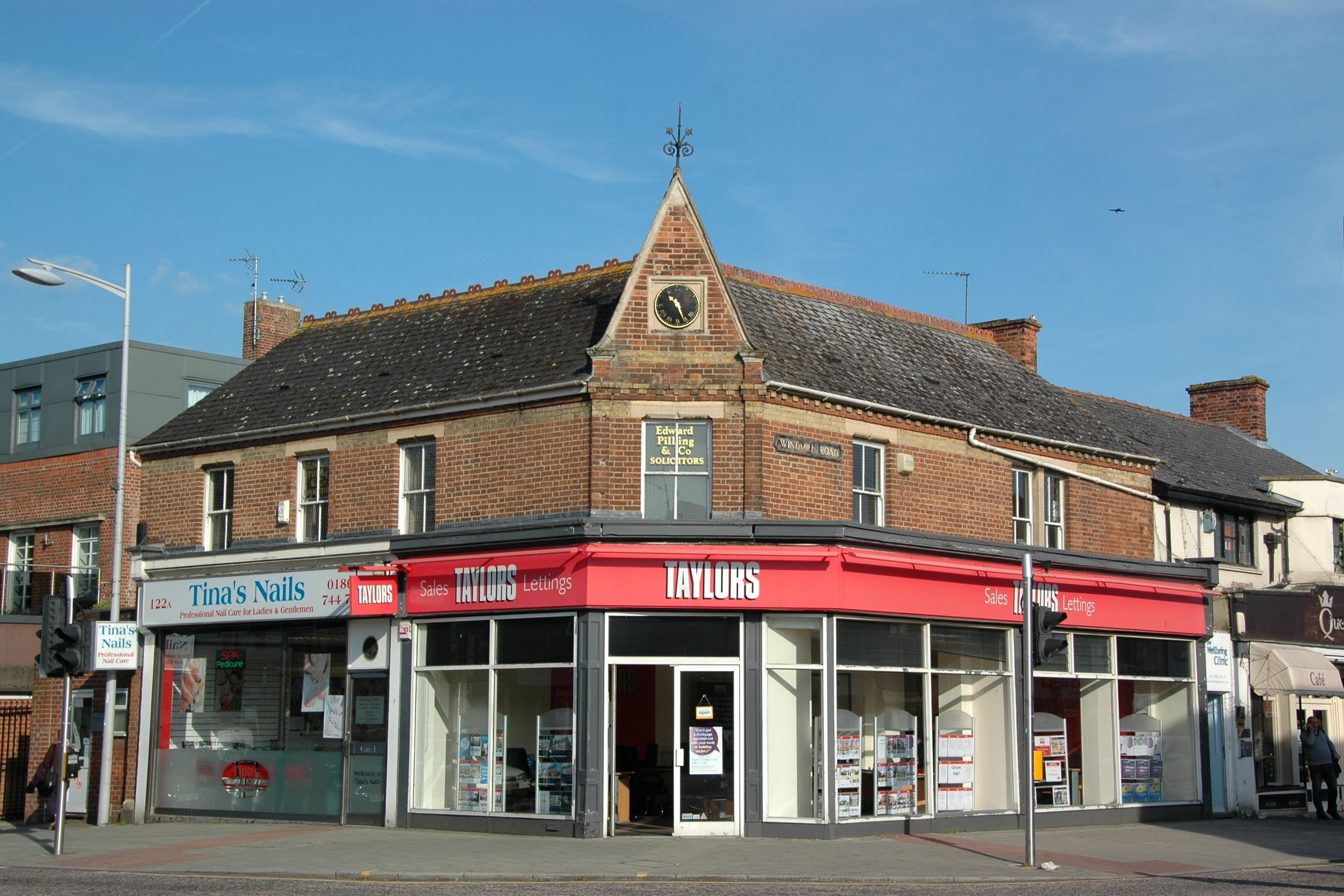
Headington Clock, at the centre of the Headington shopping centre

Headington's most famous modern landmark is The Headington Shark, made by John Buckley for local broadcaster Bill Heine in 1986. Headington has a number of green spaces including Headington Hill Park, Bury Knowle park and South Park. Close by is Shotover Hill, a heath and woodland area with views over Oxfordshire, and listed as a Site of Special Scientific Interest. The Warneford Meadow a wild grassland, bought in 1918 by public subscription for the adjacent Warneford Hospital, has been registered as a Town Green and has thus escaped development.

== Sport and leisure ==
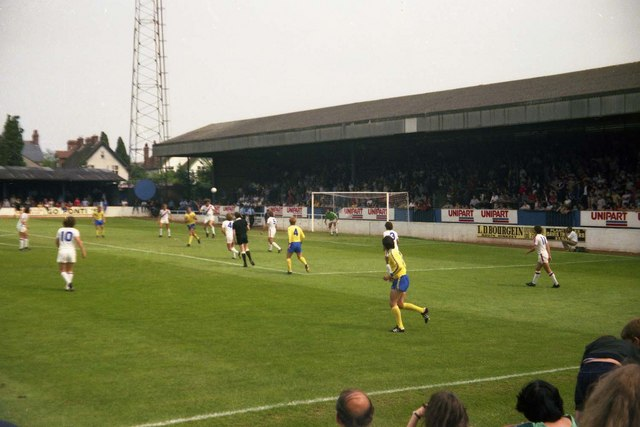
The Manor Ground off London Road in Headington.

Oxford United were formed as Headington F.C. in 1893, adding the suffix United in 1911 after merging with Headington Quarry. Until 2001 their home ground was the Manor Ground, which had its main entrance on London Road. In 2001 Oxford United moved to the Kassam Stadium near Blackbird Leys. The Manor Ground has since been demolished and a private hospital built on the site. Headington has a non-league football team, Headington Amateurs, who play at the Barton Recreation Ground in the Oxfordshire Senior League Division One.

== Education ==
Headington Library (formerly known as Bury Knowle Library) is a public library that is located in Bury Knowle Park. One of Oxfordshire County Council's 44 libraries, Headington Library houses both an adult and a children’s library. In addition to books and audiobooks, Headington Library also offers other services to the public, including printing and copying, computer access, and programs suitable for children and adults. Bury Knowle Library was first opened in 1932 by George Clardige Druce, the mayor of Oxford at the time. It became a part of Oxfordshire County Council in 1974 due to the Local Government Act 1972. In 1999, Bury Knowle Library was renamed to Headington Library. Since its opening, the library has unfortunately been met with many threats of closure (first in 1998, then 2005, then again in 2010). However, none of these attempted closures were ever successful, largely due to the support of the community for its library.

== Notable residents ==
- Brian Aldiss, the science fiction writer, lived in Old Headington until his death in 2017.
- Joan Clarke Murray, one of the Enigma code breakers, lived at 7 Larkfields from about 1991 until her death in 1996.
- Elizabeth Jennings, a renowned poet, spent her latter years living at Unity House (8 St Andrew's Lane), which was formerly the home of Emily Ann Yockney, the sister of Lord Nuffield (William Morris).
- Arthur Kerry (1879–1967), English professional footballer
- C. S. Lewis, author of The Chronicles of Narnia, moved to the district in 1921 (he was born in Northern Ireland in 1898) and lived there until moving to The Kilns at nearby Risinghurst in 1930. He lived there until his death in 1963. Lewis is buried at Holy Trinity Church at Headington Quarry.
- A more recent resident was John Simpson, senior editor of the Oxford English Dictionary.
- J. R. R. Tolkien, author of The Hobbit and The Lord of the Rings, lived at 76 Sandfield Road in Headington from 1953 until 1968.
- Emma Watson, Hermione Granger from the Harry Potter films, lived in Headington. She also attended Headington School.
- Comedian David Mitchell grew up in Headington.

A number of Oxford academics have lived in Headington over the years. They include Lord Krebs, David Marquand, Anthony Kenny, Sir Isaiah Berlin, the historian A. B. Emden, the chemist Dalziel Hammick, Lord Elton, Michael Ernest Sadler, Cyril Bailey, his daughter Mary Creighton Bailey who was born there, John Johnson, and J. O. Urmson. Others included the author Elizabeth Bowen, Anne Diamond, Robert Maxwell and his daughter Ghislaine Maxwell, and Lord Nuffield (William Morris).

== See also ==
- Headington Hill Hall
- Headington Road
- Cheney School

== Sources ==
- Bloxham, Christine; Shatford, Susanne (1996). The Changing Faces of Headington: Book One. Witney: Robert Boyd Publications. ISBN 1-899536-05-1.
- Lobel, Mary D., ed. (1957). A History of the County of Oxford: Volume 5: Bullingdon Hundred. Victoria County History. pp. 157–168.
- Sherwood, Jennifer; Pevsner, Nikolaus (1974). Oxfordshire. The Buildings of England. Harmondsworth: Penguin Books. pp. 336–339. ISBN 0-14-071045-0.
