= Angel & Greyhound Meadow, Oxford =

Flood-meadow in Oxford, England

Coordinates: 51.752°N 1.242°W

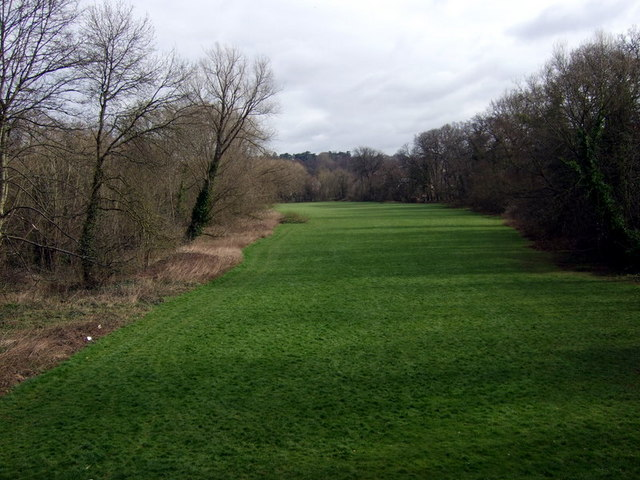

The Angel & Greyhound Meadow, also known as Angel Meadow, is a flood-meadow adjoining the River Cherwell just north of Magdalen Bridge, Oxford, England and opposite Magdalen College. It derives its name from the old Angel and Greyhound coaching inns in the High Street, for which it served as a horse-pasture.

In 1991, the nearby pub in St Clement's previously named the Oranges & Lemons was acquired by Young's and renamed the Angel & Greyhound after the meadow. In 2025, following a further change of ownership, the pub returned to its old name Oranges & Lemons.

The park is very low-lying, and often partially or completely flooded during February and March.
