= St Clement's, Oxford =

District in Oxford, England

Coordinates: 51.751°N 1.241°W

St Clement's
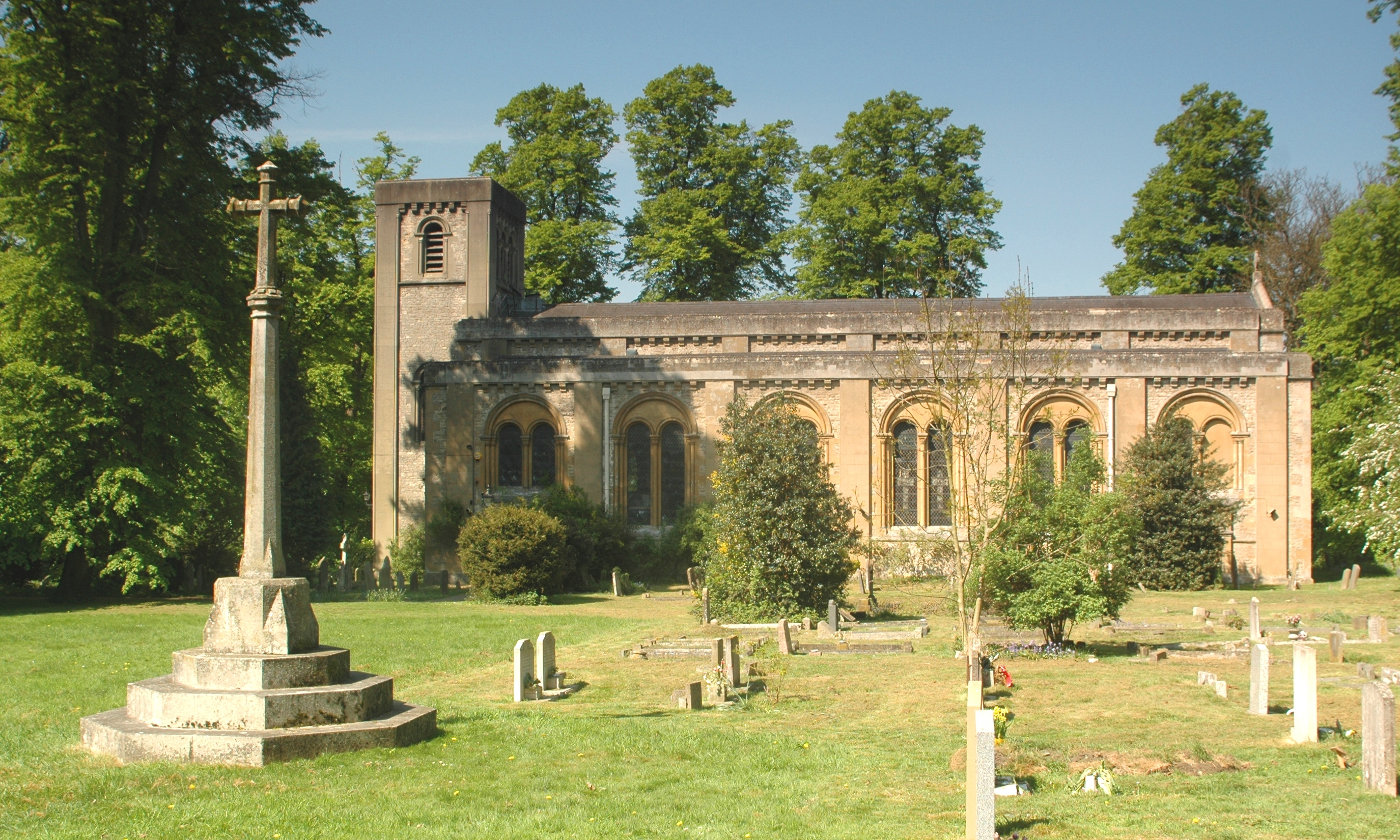
- St. Clement's parish church

- Location within Oxfordshire
- OS grid reference: SP525060
- Civil parish: unparished
- District: Oxford
- Shire county: Oxfordshire
- Region: South East
- Country: England
- Sovereign state: United Kingdom
- Post town: Oxford
- Postcode district: OX4
- Dialling code: 01865
- Police: Thames Valley
- Fire: Oxfordshire
- Ambulance: South Central
- UK Parliament: Oxford East

St Clement's is an area and road in Oxford, England, on the east bank of the River Cherwell. "St Clement's" is usually taken to describe a small triangular area from The Plain (a roundabout) bounded by the River Cherwell to the North, Cowley Road to the South, and the foot of Headington Hill to the East. It also refers to the ecclesiastical parish of St Clement's which includes some neighbouring areas and is used in the names of local City and County electoral districts.

The area has a multicultural and socially diverse population ranging from owner occupiers, student accommodation and homes in multiple occupation to social housing. A number of properties in the area belong to The Charity of Thomas Dawson (The Dawson Trust) which was founded in 1521 to generate money for the benefit of the people of St Clement's and the parish church.

== St Clement's Street (formerly High Street) ==
The area's main road, St Clement's Street (often shortened to just "St Clement's"), links The Plain near Magdalen Bridge with London Place at the foot of Headington Hill at the junction with Marston Road to the north. The road continues east as Headington Road and is designated the A420. At the point where St Clement's reaches South Park, there is a junction with Morrell Avenue to the southwest.

St Clement's Street was originally the main road between Oxford and London. The street is noted for its many small shops and restaurants

Stone's Almshouses in St Clement's Street were founded in 1700.

The artist William Turner of Oxford lived here with his wife Elizabeth Ilott after their marriage in 1824.

The Royal Microscopical Society, a learned society for the promotion of microscopy, has been based on St Clement's Street since 1967.

The Old Black Horse (102 St Clement's Street) is a 17th century coaching inn and one of the few buildings in the area to survive the English Civil War. It belongs to The Dawson Trust.

== Other streets ==
- Bath Street
- Caroline Street
- Cave Street (formerly George Street)
- Cross Street
- Dawson Street is named after Thomas Dawson.
- London Place
- Morrell Avenue is named after the Morrell family who lived at Headington Hill Hall in the 19th and 20th centuries. The Morrells were a wealthy brewing family who owned a large amount of land in St Clement's.
- Rectory Road (formerly Pembroke Street) runs between St Clement's Street and Cowley Road. It was named after the St Clement's Rectory (now a home for the elderly) which originally stood on the corner of Rectory Road and St Clement's Street.
- Marston Road St Clement's Church, the area's Church of England parish church, is off the southern end of Marston Road. The original St Clement's parish church was at The Plain but was demolished in 1828.

== Open spaces ==
- South Park
- Angel & Greyhound Meadow

== Sources and further reading ==
- Crossley, Alan; Elrington, C.R. (eds.); Chance, Eleanor; Colvin, Christina; Cooper, Janet; Day, C.J.; Hassall, T.G.; Selwyn, Nesta (1979). Victoria County History: A History of the County of Oxford, Volume 4.
- Curl, James Stevens (1977). The Erosion of Oxford. Oxford Illustrated Press. pp. 133–148. ISBN 0-902280-40-6.
- Lobel, Mary D, ed. (1957). A History of the County of Oxford: Volume 5: Bullingdon Hundred. Victoria County History. pp. 258–266.
- Sherwood, Jennifer; Pevsner, Nikolaus (1974). Oxfordshire. The Buildings of England. Harmondsworth: Penguin Books. pp. 291, 331. ISBN 0-14-071045-0.
