= Science Oxford =

Science Oxford is part of a charitable organisation called The Oxford Trust, based in Oxford, England. Science Oxford is the trust's education and public engagement branch. The Oxford Trust was founded in 1985 by Sir Martin and Lady Audrey Wood. Science Oxford was founded in 2006. Science Oxford operates the Science Oxford Centre, a science discovery centre located in Headington, and educational programmes.
