= The Plain, Oxford =

Roundabout in Oxford, England

Coordinates: 51.750°N 1.244°W

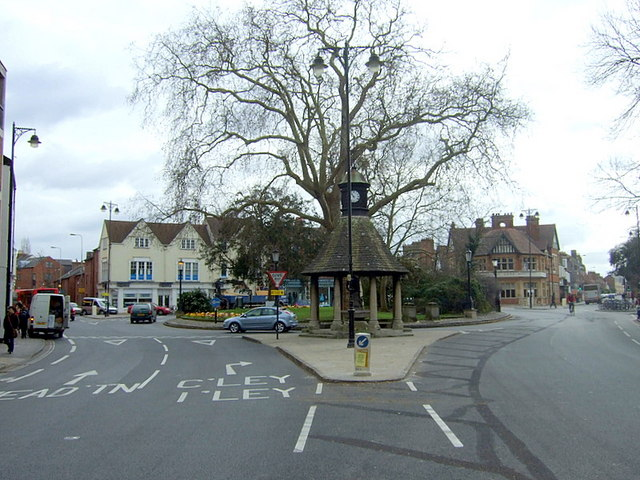
The Plain. The road to the left is St Clement's, in the centre (obscured) is Cowley Road and to the right is Iffley Road.

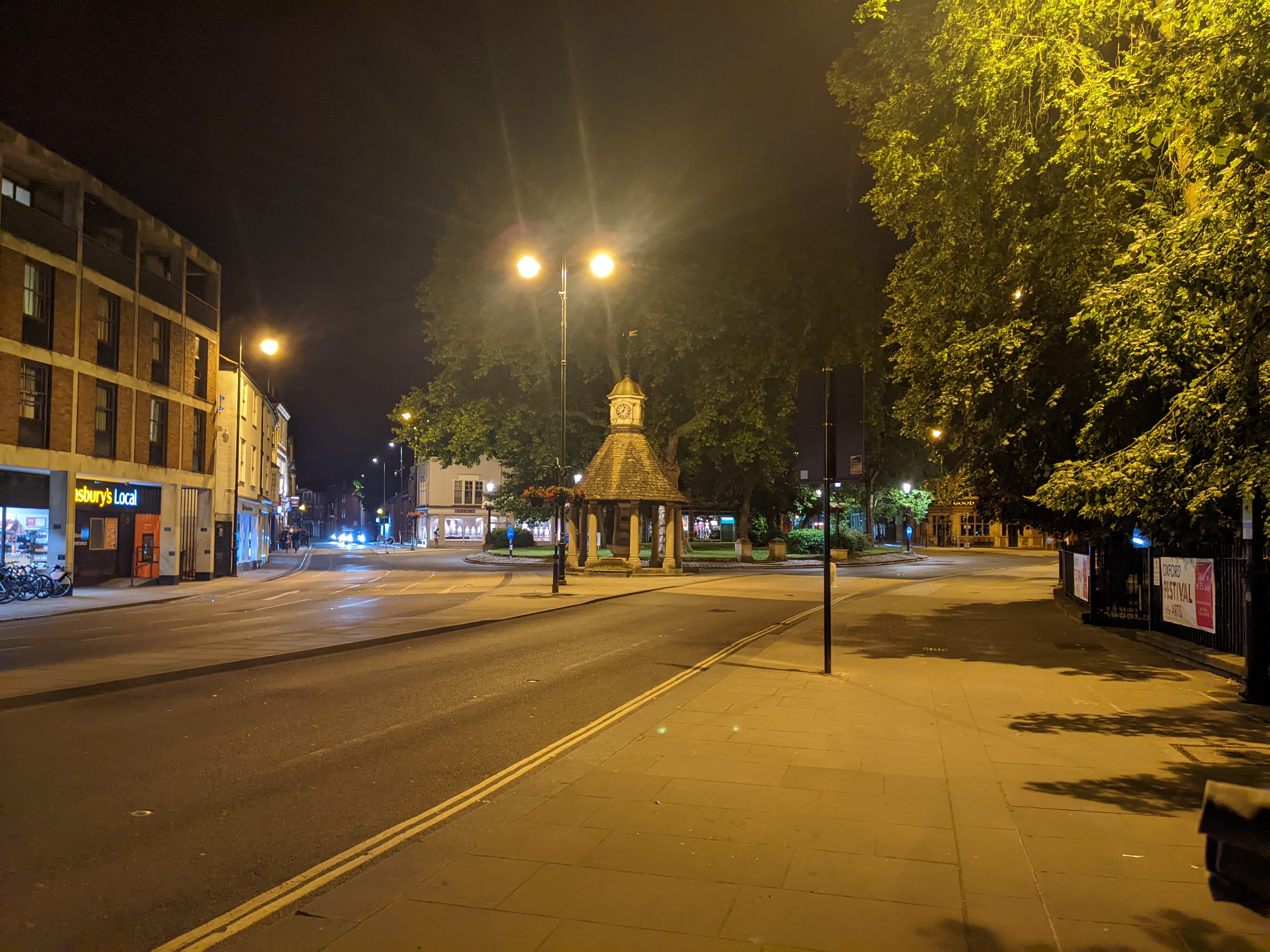
The Plain roundabout at night. It tends to be much quieter in the evening, though sometimes can still get congested with coaches and taxis. Sainsbury's Local can be seen tucked away in the corner of the roundabout.

The Plain is an important junction, now a roundabout constructed in 1950, just east of Magdalen Bridge in Oxford, England. To the east and southeast are St Clement's, Cowley Road and Iffley Road which leads to the Liddell Buildings of Christ Church on the other side of the Christ Church Meadow. Magdalen College School is to the south. Cowley Place, also to the south, leads to St Hilda's College, the most easterly college of the University of Oxford.

The Plain received its name after the parish church of St Clement's which stood here until 1829. The roundabout is the site of the former churchyard.

== South African War Memorial ==
A war memorial dedicated to the 142 men of the First Battalion Oxfordshire Light Infantry who died in the Second Boer War (1899-1902) stood on the site of the former churchyard from 1903 to 1950. The memorial is currently at Edward Brookes Barracks in Abingdon.

== Victoria Fountain ==
The Plain includes a small but prominent building facing Magdalen Bridge, 'Victoria Fountain, protected by a roof on stone columns On top of the sloping tiled roof is a small clock tower. The fountain was a gift to the city by G. Herbert Morrell, designed by E. P. Warren and officially opened on 25 May 1899 by Princess Louise. The fountain is a Grade II listed building.

The Victoria Fountain is built on the site of a former toll house.

== Traffic problems ==
The former churchyard was bought by the City Council in the 1930s in order to improve public safety and traffic flow. Following delays caused by the Second World War, a roundabout was finally created in 1950.

Early in 2006 the Plain was further redeveloped to make the junction safer. The 2006 work introduced pinch points between the motor and cycle traffic, especially on the Iffley Road entry to the roundabout. The 2007 redevelopment work (finished in late September) was mostly resurfacing, but there was some movement of the traffic islands. In 2014, it was announced that £1.3m of funding would improve the roundabout and increase the safety for cyclists, with the work completed in 2015. There were further calls to make changes to the junction in 2022 following the death of a cyclist.

== See also ==
- St Clement's Church, Oxford
