= South Park, Oxford =

Park in Oxford, England

Coordinates: 51°45′05″N 1°13′52″W

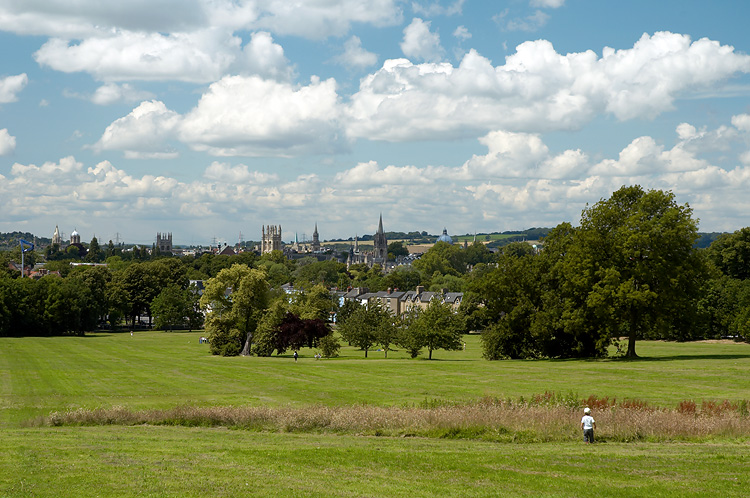
View across South Park

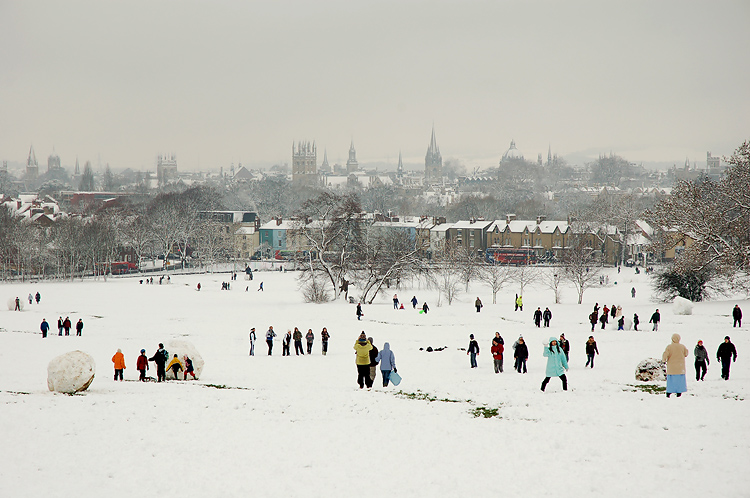
South Park in the snow

South Park is a park on Headington Hill in east Oxford, England. It is the largest park within Oxford city limits. A good view of the city centre with its historic spires and towers of Oxford University can be obtained at the park's highest point, a favourite location for photographers.

== Location ==
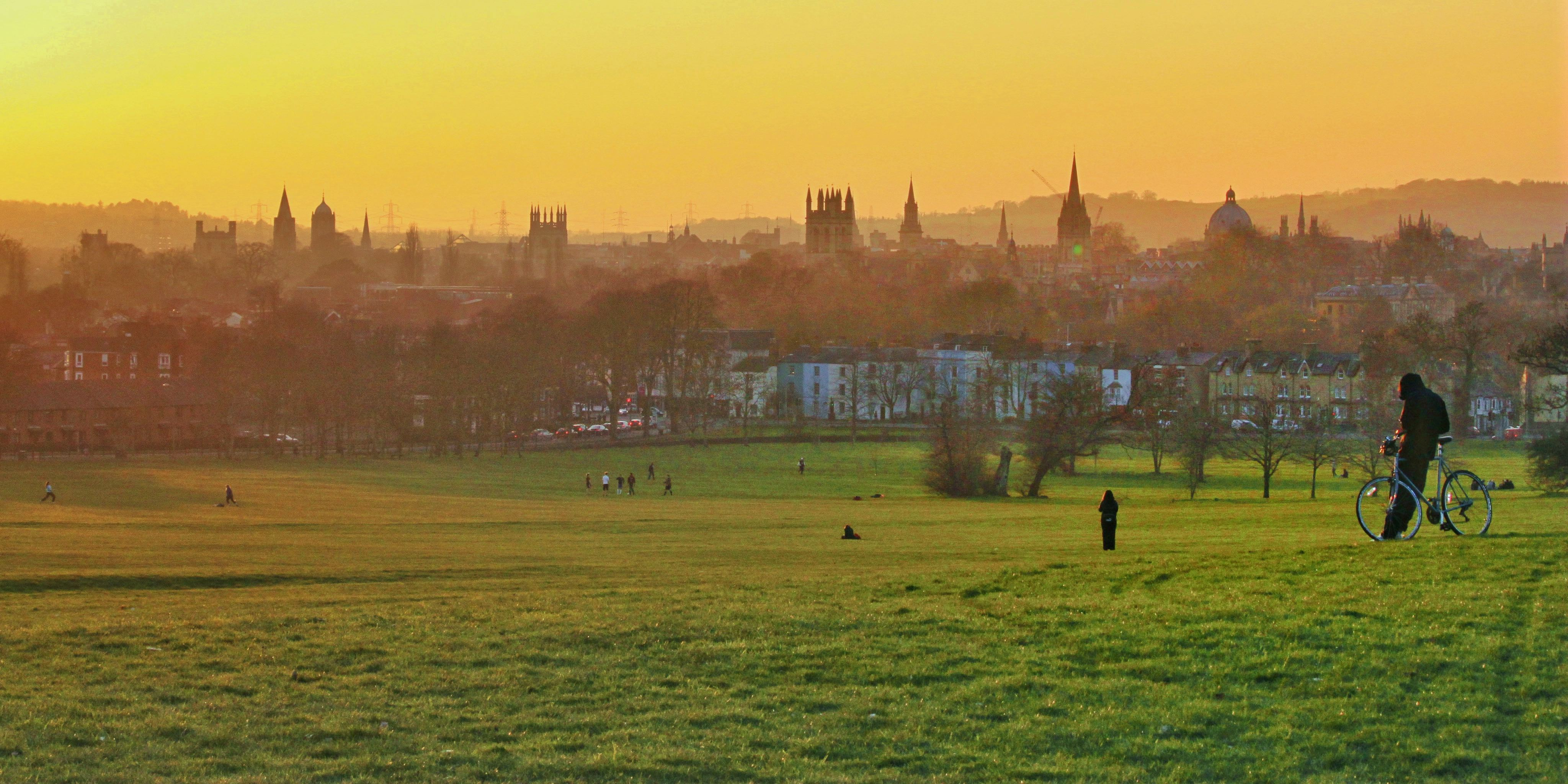
Oxford's dreaming spires at sunset

The park is located alongside Headington Road. St Clement's links the park with central Oxford. A 19th-century bridge links the park with Headington Hill Park. On the southern boundary is the gently curving Morrell Avenue, named after a local brewery family. At the top end of the park is the Oxford Artisan Distillery, established in 2017 within the former Cheney Farm buildings.

== History ==
The land was privately owned by the Morrell family of Headington Hill Hall until bought by the Oxford Preservation Trust in 1932 to preserve it as open space. In 1951 the Trust gave the land to the city of Oxford. A carved stone by the sculptor Eric Gill is located at the foot of the Park and records the Trust's gift thus:

This park was acquired by the Oxford Preservation Trust through the liberality of the Pilgrim Trust and David and Joanna Randall-MacIver 1932

== Events ==
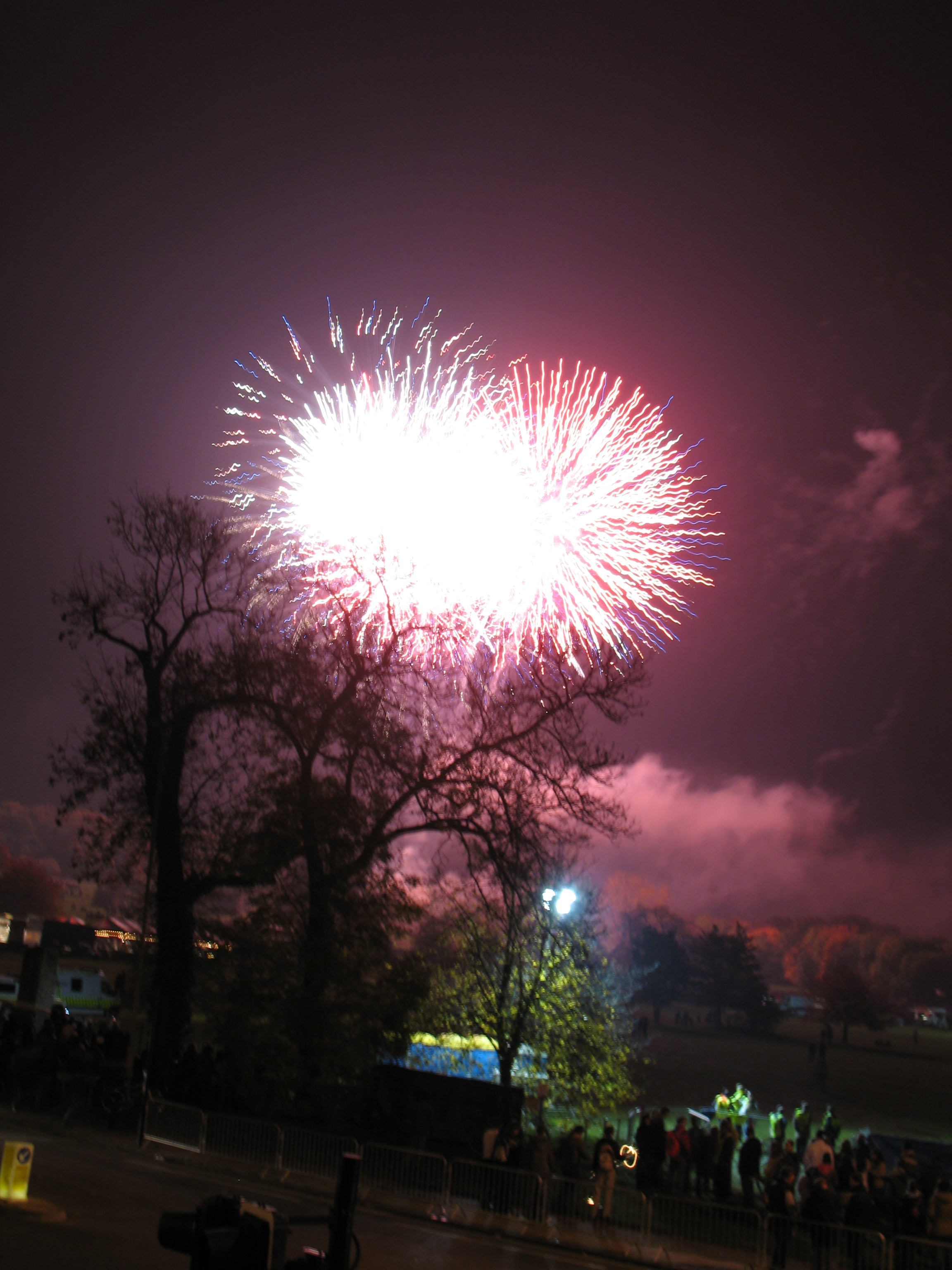
Annual Bonfire Night fireworks display at South Park, Oxford

Many events are held in the park including the annual parade of the Lord Mayor and the annual fund-raising fireworks display of the Oxford branch of Round Table.

On 7 July 2001, the rock band Radiohead performed a concert to more 40,000 people, with supporting performances by Beck, Humphrey Lyttelton, Sigur Rós, Rock of Travolta and Hestor Thrale. According to journalist Alex Ross, the show may have been the largest public gathering in Oxford history.

== Spanish anti-fascist memorial ==
Just outside South Park is the Oxford Spanish Civil War memorial which is dedicated to local residents who travelled to Spain to join the International Brigades to fight against fascist forces backed by Hitler and Mussolini during the Spanish Civil War 1936-1939. The memorial is located where Headington Road meets Morrell Avenue.

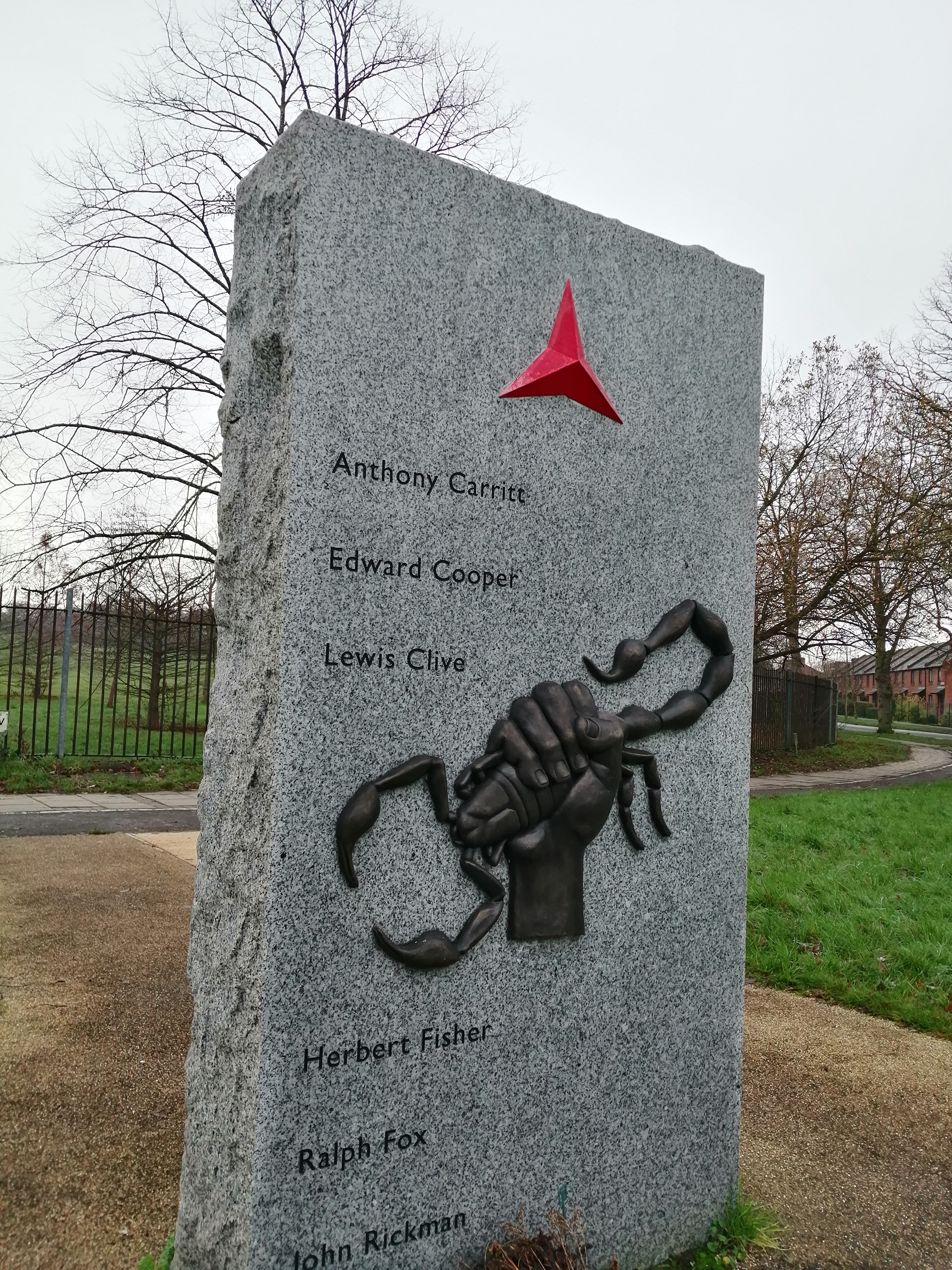
Located on Headington Road is the Oxford Spanish Civil War memorial, dedicated to Oxford residents who joined the International Brigades during the Spanish Civil War and died fighting against fascist forces backed by Hitler and Mussolini

During the Spanish Civil War, 29 British people with connections to Oxfordshire joined the International Brigades, with a further 2 who joined POUM. Most of the volunteers were communist activists, and many had links to Britain's Jewish communities. Oxford was a hub for anti-fascist activism, homes within the county housed hundreds of Basque refugee children and various physical fights between anti-fascist activists and the Oxford University Fascist Association.

The memorial was the focus of minor controversy when all plans to have an anti-fascist memorial in the city centre were rejected by Oxford City Council, until the current site was agreed upon.

== See also ==
- Headington Hill Park
- Oxford Spanish Civil War memorial
- The Oxford Artisan Distillery
