= Headington Hill Hall =

Building in Oxford, UK

Coordinates: 51°45′18″N 1°13′52″W

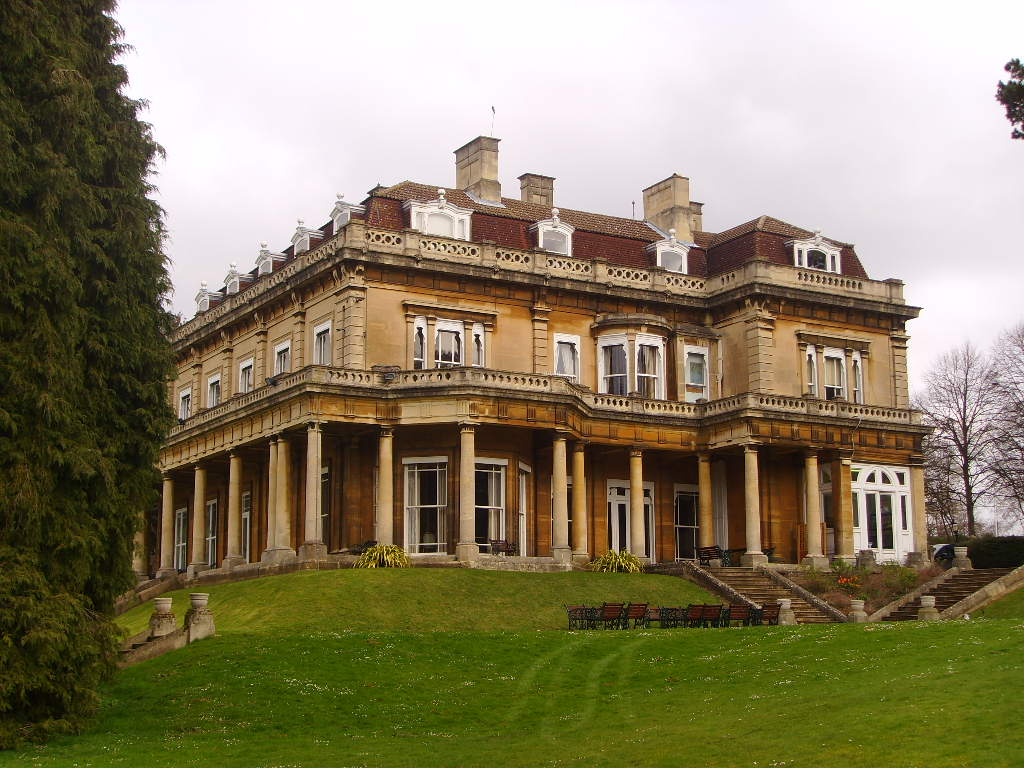
View of Headington Hill Hall.

Headington Hill Hall stands on Headington Hill in the east of Oxford, England. It was built in 1824 for the Morrell family, who remained in residence for 114 years. It became the home to Pergamon Press and to media tycoon Robert Maxwell. It currently houses Oxford Brookes School of Law.

== History ==
The hall was built in 1824 for the Morrell family, local brewers. It was extended between 1856 and 1858 by James Morrell Jr. (1810–1863) who built an Italianate mansion designed by the architect John Thomas. James Morrell and his wife Alicia died in 1863 and 1864, leaving their possessions including the hall and the brewery on trust for their 10-year-old daughter Emily Morrell. The three trustees tried to deal with Emily's crush on a distant cousin by sending her away to an aunt and forbidding any communication between the pair. Emily married her cousin and made her home at the Hall.

Oscar Wilde, gaudily dressed as Prince Rupert, attended an all-night fancy dress May Day Ball given by Emily and Herbert Morrell at the Hall for around 300 guests on 1 May 1878. Lady Ottoline Morrell (1873–1938), who owned the Hall for a period, was particularly associated with the Bloomsbury Group as a hostess.

From 1939, the property was requisitioned by the government for use as a military hospital during World War II. After the war, it became a rehabilitation centre for Battle of Britain pilots, run by the Red Cross and the Order of St John.

In 1953, James Morrell III sold Headington Hill Hall to Oxford City Council. It continued to be used as a rehabilitation centre until 1958.

Subsequently, the publisher Robert Maxwell (1923–1991), founder of Pergamon Press and his family, took an 85-year lease on the building and the surrounding 14-acre estate from the Council, and Maxwell took a 40-year sub lease for the hall itself from one of his companies. He described it as the "best council house in the country" and undertook a careful restoration of the building, matching colours to originals and repairing stucco ceilings from the derelict condition he had taken on the property in. Maxwell commissioned a stained-glass window depicting Samson at the Gates of Gaza by Israeli sculptor Nehemia Azaz for the imperial staircase. Maxwell built an office building in the grounds of the hall to house Pergamon Press which after coming under the control of Oxford Brookes University became the Helena Kennedy Students’ Centre.

After Maxwell's death, and subsequent denouement, receivers Grant Thornton marketed the balance of the lease for the site, the hall and the 50,000 sq ft office block through Conrad Ritblat & Co. In December 1992, sums of between £7.5 million and £20 million were reported for the lease.

Since 1992, the Council has leased the property to Oxford Brookes University. It houses the Oxford Brookes University School of Law.

== See also ==
- Headington Hill Park
