= Headington Hill =

Coordinates: 51.756°N 1.225°W

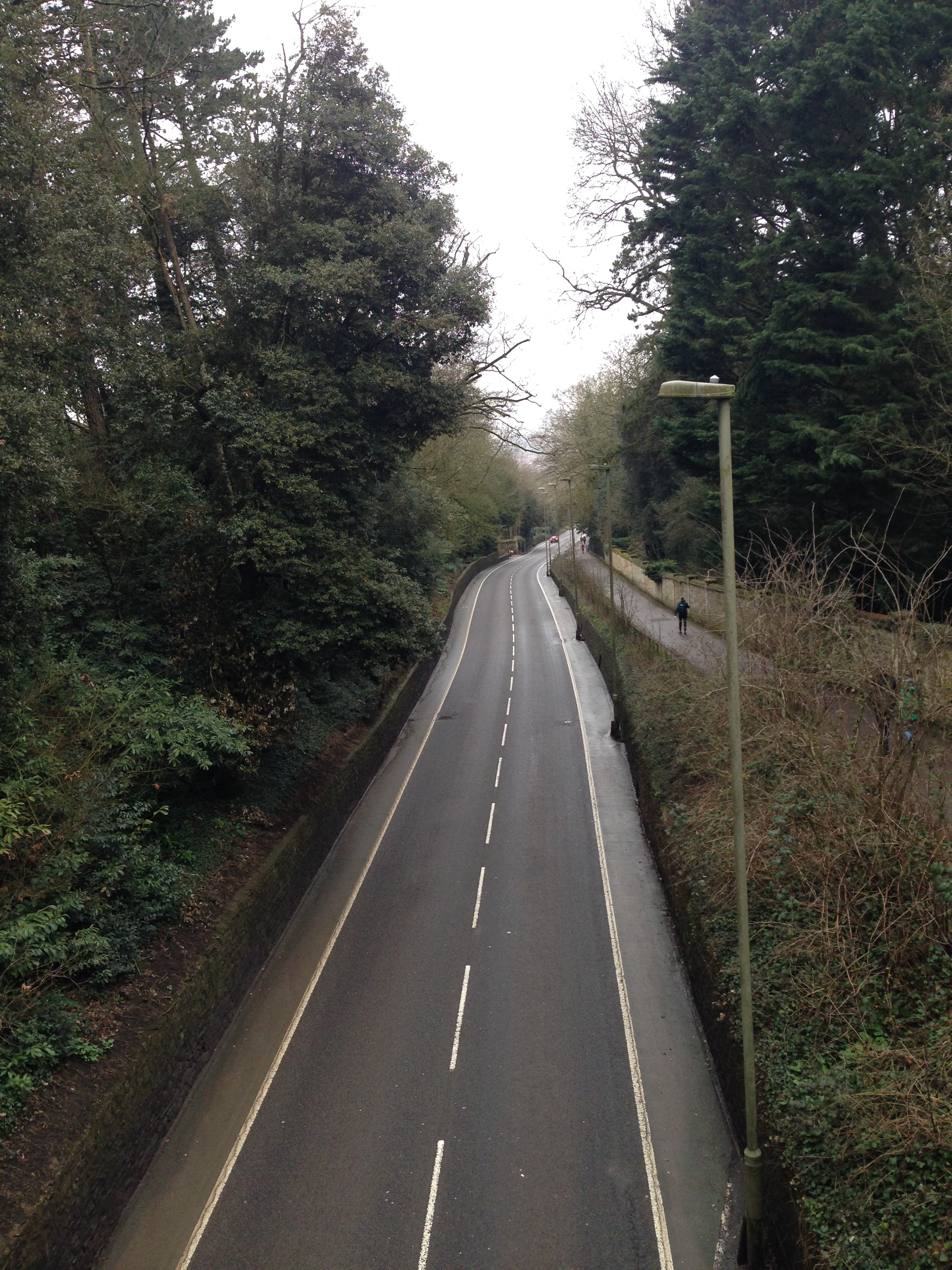
- A view down Headington Hill, along Headington Road, from the bridge which now connects two parts of Oxford Brookes campus.

- Location within Oxfordshire
- OS grid reference: SP531063
- Civil parish: unparished
- District: Oxford
- Shire county: Oxfordshire
- Region: South East
- Country: England
- Sovereign state: United Kingdom
- Post town: Oxford
- Postcode district: OX3
- Dialling code: 01865
- Police: Thames Valley
- Fire: Oxfordshire
- Ambulance: South Central
- UK Parliament: Oxford East
- Website: Headington, Oxford

Headington Hill is a hill in the east of Oxford, England, in the suburb of Headington. The Headington Road goes up the hill leading out of the city. There are good views of the spires of Oxford from the hill, especially from the top of South Park.

Between 1644 and 1646, Headington Hill was used by the Parliamentarian forces while besieging Oxford during the First English Civil War. Headington Hill Hall, built in 1824 for the Morrell family (local brewers), stands on the hill, and is now the home of Oxford Brookes University's School of Law.

== Spanish anti-fascist memorial ==
Headington Hill is the home of the Oxford Spanish Civil War memorial which is dedicated to local residents who travelled to Spain to join the International Brigades to fight against fascist forces backed by Hitler and Mussolini during the Spanish Civil War 1936-1939. The memorial is located where Headington Road meets

During the Spanish Civil War, 29 British people with connections to Oxfordshire joined the International Brigades, with a further 2 who joined POUM. Most of the volunteers were communist activists, and many had links to Britain's Jewish communities. Oxford was a hub for anti-fascist activism, homes within the county housed hundreds of Basque refugee children and various physical fights between anti-fascist activists and the Oxford University Fascist Association.

The memorial was the focus of minor controversy when all plans to have an anti-fascist memorial in the city center were rejected by Oxford city council, until the current site was agreed upon.

== See also ==
- Cotuit Hall
- Oxford Brookes University
