= List of churches in Oxford =

Churches in Oxford, England

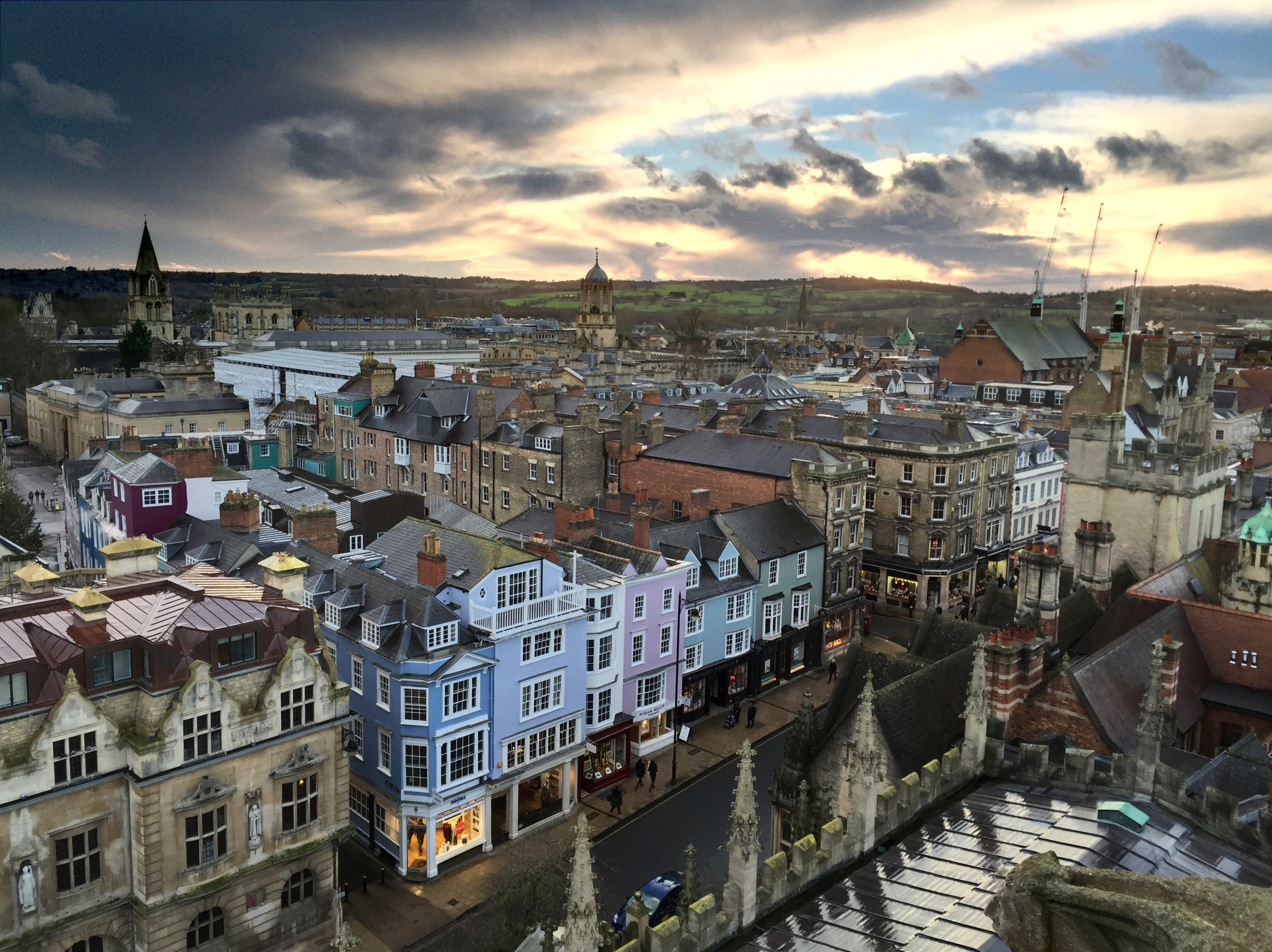
Several dreaming spires seen from University Church of St Mary the Virgin at the centre of Oxford

This list of churches in Oxford records churches in the city of Oxford, England.

The list does not include college chapels (except for Christ Church Cathedral and arguably Blackfriars).

== Church of England ==
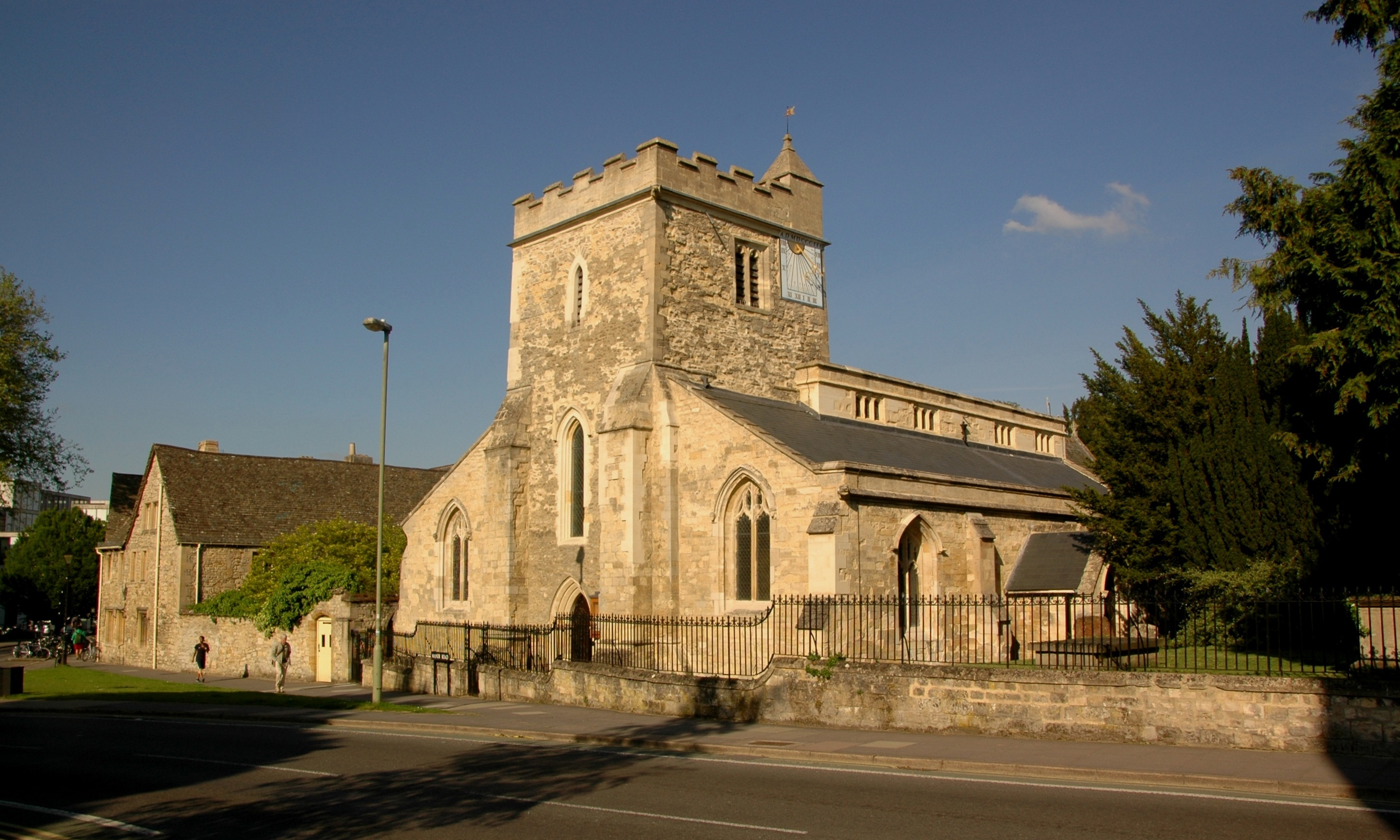
St Cross Church.

- Christ Church Cathedral, St Aldate's
- All Saints, Lime Walk, Headington
- Holy Trinity Church, Headington Quarry
- Pusey House, St Giles' Street
- St Alban the Martyr, Charles Street
- St Aldate's, St Aldate's Street
- St Andrew, St Andrew's Road, Headington
- St Andrew, Linton Road
- St Barnabas, Cardigan Street, Jericho
- St Bartholomew's Chapel, Bartlemas, Cowley Road
- St Clement, Marston Road
- St Ebbe's, Pennyfarthing Place
- St Francis of Assisi, Hollow Way, Cowley
- St Frideswide, Botley Road
- St Giles, Woodstock Road
- St James, Beauchamp Lane, Cowley
- St John the Evangelist, Iffley Road
- St John the Evangelist, Vicarage Road
- St Luke, Canning Crescent
- St Margaret's, St Margaret's Road
- St Mary Magdalen, Magdalen Street
- St Mary, Bayswater Road, Barton
- St Mary and St John, Cowley Road
- St Mary the Virgin, Iffley
- St Matthew, Marlborough Road
- St Michael and All Angels, Lonsdale Road, Summertown
- St Michael and All Angels, Marston Road, New Marston
- St Michael at the Northgate, Cornmarket Street
- St Thomas the Martyr, Becket Street
- University Church of St Mary the Virgin, High Street

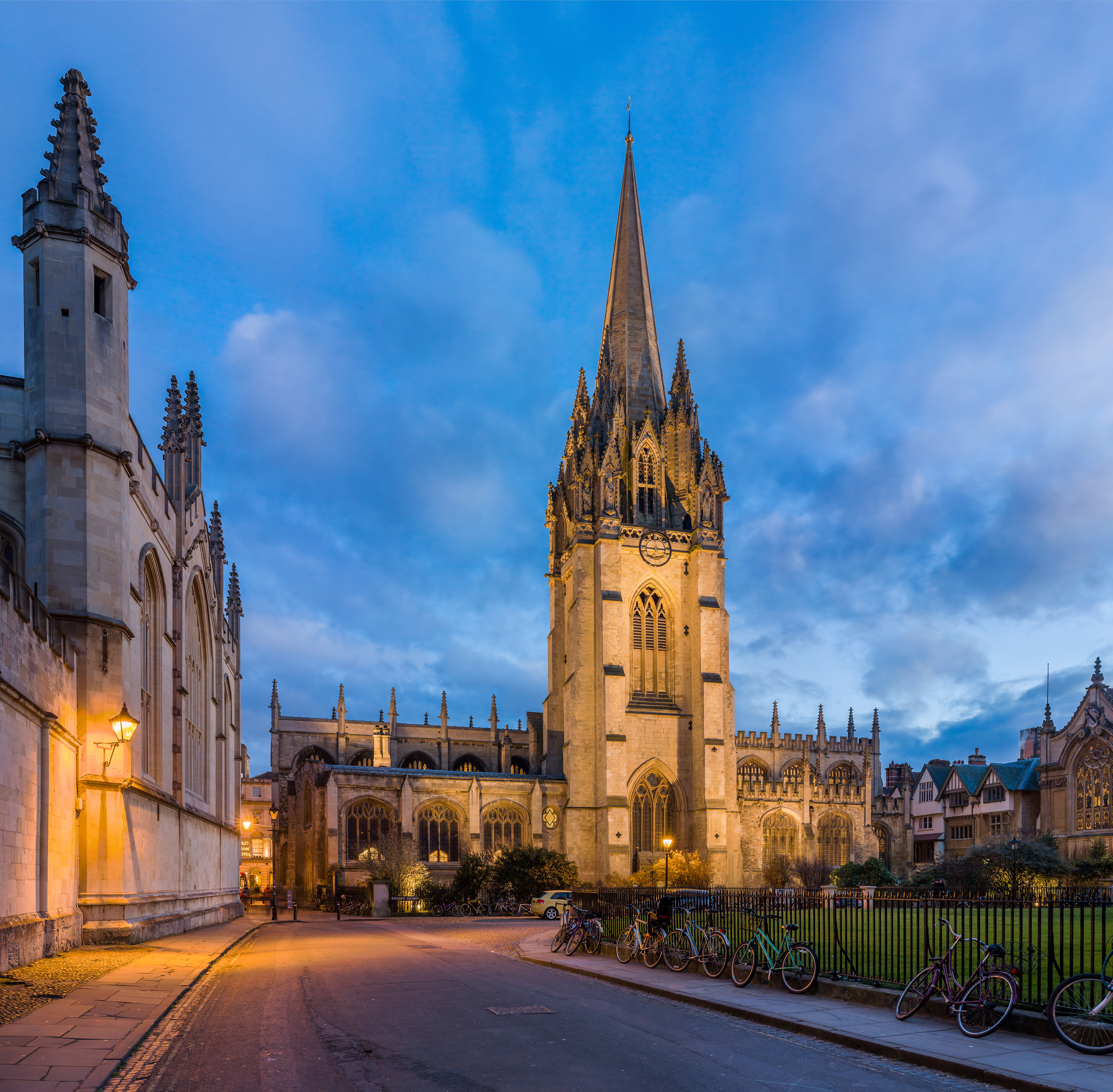
University Church of St Mary the Virgin is at the centre of Oxford

== Roman Catholic ==
- St Aloysius Gonzaga (The Oxford Oratory), 25 Woodstock Road
- St Anthony of Padua, 115 Headley Way
- Blackfriars, 64 St Giles'
- Corpus Christi, 88 Wharton Road, Headington
- Blessed Dominic Barberi, Oxford Road, Littlemore
- Our Lady Help of Christians, 59 Hollow Way, Cowley
- Sacred Heart, Sawpit Road, Blackbird Leys
- St Edmund of Abingdon and St Frideswide, (Greyfriars), 182 Iffley Road
- SS Gregory and Augustine, 322 Woodstock Road
- Holyrood Church (Hinksey Parish), Abingdon Road
- Catholic Chaplaincy, Rose Place, St Aldate's

== Evangelical (affiliated to Fellowship of Independent Evangelical Churches) ==
- Magdalen Road Church, Magdalen Road, Oxford.
- Marston Neighbourhood Church, Marston Road, Oxford.
- Trinity Church Oxford, a new evangelical church plant (September 2013 launch).
- Woodstock Road Baptist Church, 198 Woodstock Road, Oxford.

== Baptist ==
- New Road Baptist Church, Bonn Square
- Headington Baptist Church
- Botley Baptist, Westminster Way, Botley
- John Bunyan Baptist Church, Crowell Road
- Oxford Baptist Chapel, a Christ-centered, Gospel preaching church (Albert Street, Jericho)
- Woodstock Road Baptist Church, an evangelical church, 198 Woodstock Road, Oxford
- People's Baptist Church (International Baptist Church) Crowell Road

== Eastern Orthodox ==
- Orthodox Church of the Holy Trinity and the Annunciation, 1 Canterbury Road (off Banbury Road)
- St Nicholas Russian Orthodox Church, 34 Ferry Road

== Methodist ==
- Wesley Memorial Methodist Church, New Inn Hall Street
- The Methodist Church, Lime Walk
- Rose Hill Methodist Church
- Cowley Road Methodist Church

== Presbyterian ==
- Christ Church Headington
- Oxford Presbyterian Church

== United Reformed ==
- Collinwood Road United Reformed Church, Risinghurst
- Marston United Reformed Church, Marston Road
- St Columba's United Reformed Church, Alfred Street
- Summertown United Reformed Church
- Temple Cowley United Reformed Church

== Ecumenical ==
- Holy Family Church, 1 Cuddesdon Way (Anglican, Methodist, Baptist, United Reformed, Moravian)

== Non-denominational churches ==
- Beersheba International Faith Church
- Sword for the Lord.Oxford, West Oxford Community Centre, Botley Road, Oxford

== Other denominations ==
- Apostolic Faith Church of Oxford, United Pentecostal Church in Oxford
- Bethel Gospel Church, The Holy Family Church, 1 Cuddesdon Way, Blackbird Leys
- Cornerstone Church Assemblies of God, Quarry High Street, Headington, Oxford
- Calvary Chapel, meets in Botley Primary school
- Chinese Christian Church, 15 Gorse Leas
- Christ Embassy Oxford Church
- Christian Life Centre Church
- Deeper Life Bible Church
- Elim Pentecostal, Botley Road
- First Church of Christ, Scientist, Oxford, 36a St Giles'
- German Lutheran services at St Mary the Virgin, High Street
- Grace Springs Church
- Greater World Spiritualist Church, Cowley Road, Cowley, Oxford
- Jesus Army
- Hillsong Church, meets in Odeon Cinema, Magdalen Street
- James Street Church Open Brethren
- Kingsway International Christian Centre (KICC) Oxford Branch. The Barn, Nightingale Avenue
- Living Faith international
- Oxford Unitarians at Harris Manchester College Chapel, Mansfield Road
- Oxford Bible Church
- Oxford Christadelphian Church, Tyndale Road.
- Oxford Community Church (OCC), Osney Mead
- Oxford Vineyard
- People's Baptist Church (International Baptist Church)
- Redeemed Christian Church of God, Barton Neighbourhood Centre, Headington, Oxford.
- Oxford Quaker Meeting (Religious Society of Friends), 43 St Giles
- Pentecostal Church in Oxford, Victory Worship Centre, Malayalam Church Oxford, Tamil Church Oxford, Kanada Church Oxford, Telugu Church Oxford Pentecostal church, Oxford Services at Cherwell School, North Site
- RCCG Lighthouse Parish, at Abingdon, Oxford and Witney
- Rivers of Life Church, Marston Road
- The Salvation Army, Oxford Citadel, Lytham Street
- Word Fountain Christian Ministries, Hollow Way, Cowley

== Former churches ==
- St John the Baptist, Middle Way, Summertown (demolished 1924)
- St Martin's Church, Carfax (part demolished, only Carfax Tower survives)
- Chapel of St Mary at Smith Gate (now the Middle Common Room of Hertford College)
- St Paul's, Walton Street (deconsecrated, now "Freud's" bar)
- St Philip and St James Church, Woodstock Road (now the Oxford Centre for Mission Studies)

One church has been converted to a college chapel:

- St Peter-le-Bailey, New Inn Hall Street, now the chapel of St Peter's College, Oxford

Three churches have been converted into college libraries:

- All Saints, High Street, now the library of Lincoln College
- St Cross, St Cross Road, now the historic collections centre (i.e. archive of manuscripts, rare books etc.) of Balliol College
- St Peter-in-the-East, Queen's Lane, now the library of St Edmund Hall

== See also ==
- City Church, Oxford
