= Headington Quarry =

Village in Oxford, England

Coordinates: 51.76°N 1.20°W

Headington Quarry: Quarry
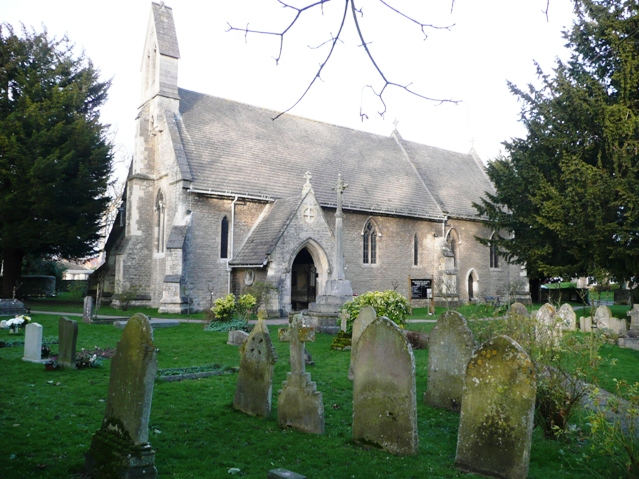
- Holy Trinity Church, Headington Quarry

- Location within Oxfordshire
- OS grid reference: SP553070
- Civil parish: Headington Quarry
- District: Oxford
- Shire county: Oxfordshire
- Region: South East
- Country: England
- Sovereign state: United Kingdom
- Post town: Oxford
- Postcode district: OX3
- Dialling code: 01865
- Police: Thames Valley
- Fire: Oxfordshire
- Ambulance: South Central
- UK Parliament: Oxford East

Headington Quarry is a suburb and civil parish of Oxford, England. Once a separate village built on the site of a former limestone quarry, it is now fully integrated into the city of Oxford and lies approximately 3 miles east of the city centre, just inside the Oxford Ring Road. It is near to Headington, Wood Farm, Risinghurst, and Barton.

Today it is known colloquially as "Quarry". and is now considerably uneven due to previous quarrying in the area.

The Headington Quarry Morris Dancers are based in the area. Headington Quarry Morris Dancers were the first Morris dancers ever seen by Cecil Sharp, on Boxing Day 1899. This chance meeting was one of the events that sparked a lifelong interest in folk dance, song and music, to which Sharp devoted much of his life.

Headington Quarry was designated a conservation area in 1971, and the Friends of Quarry is a residents' association which aims to preserve the distinctive character of the Conservation Area and its immediate neighbourhood.

== History ==
Headington Quarry Church of England First School, built in 1864, was closed in 2003 and was replaced by Headington Quarry Foundation Stage School. The building is now listed.

The wartime Bletchley Park cryptoanalyst Joan Clarke, colleague and briefly fiancée of Alan Turing, lived in Headington Quarry from 1991 until her death in 1996. In July 2019, a blue plaque was unveiled at her former home.

=== Church ===
Holy Trinity Church, the local parish church, was designed by George Gilbert Scott - with a window in the chancel being designed by Ninian Comper - and built in the late 1840s. The Friends of Holy Trinity Church was founded in 2002 to raise funds and look after the church.

C. S. Lewis, Oxford academic and author of The Chronicles of Narnia, attended Holy Trinity Church and is buried in the churchyard.

There is a former Methodist Chapel in Quarry High Street.

== Headington stone ==
Headington Quarry had a number of stone quarries. Headington stone, a style of limestone, was traditionally used for some Oxford University college buildings, although it was prone to erosion by pollution. In 1396, stone from Headington was used to build the bell-tower for New College. Headington stone was also used for the foundations and walls of All Souls College in the first half of the fifteenth century, and then in the 1520s by Cardinal Wolsey to build his Cardinal College (now Christ Church).

== Sources ==
- Sherwood, Jennifer; Pevsner, Nikolaus (1974). The Buildings of England: Oxfordshire. Harmondsworth: Penguin Books. p. 337. ISBN 0-14-071045-0.
