= Hollow Way, Oxford =

Road in Oxford, England

Coordinates: 51.73923°N 1.20633°W

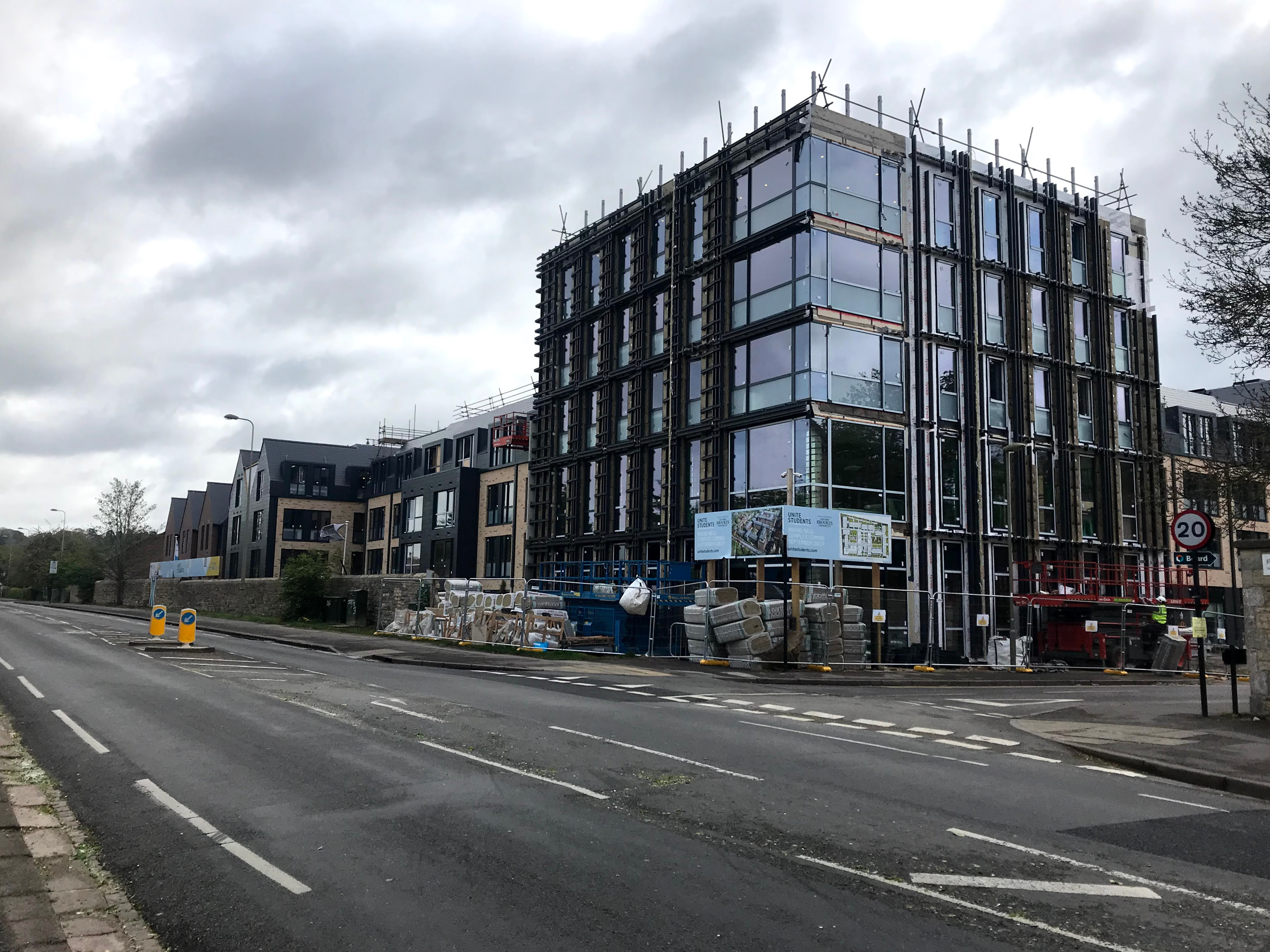
View along Hollow Way

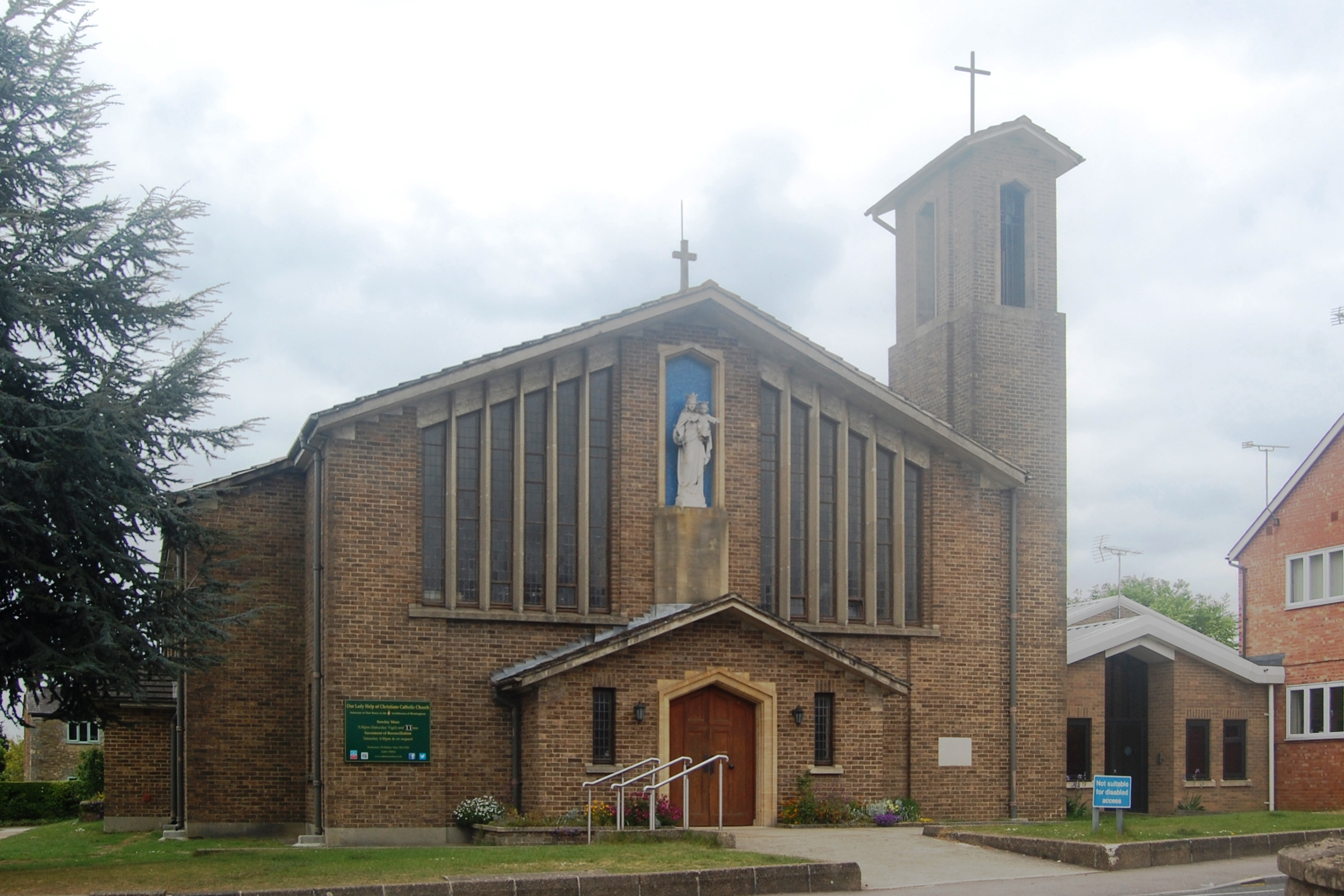
Church of Our Lady Help of Christians, Hollow Way

Hollow Way is a road in Oxford, England, which leads from central Cowley to Wood Farm and Headington. It starts at the junction with Oxford Road and Garsington Road and finishes at The Slade and Horspath Driftway, running through neighbourhoods such as the Lye Valley. Its route number is B4495.

Hollow Way was mentioned by the antiquary and author John Pointer in 1724.

133 Hollow Way is a 1924 house that has a historic "ghost sign" on its brickwork.

The Church of Our Lady Help of Christians is a Catholic Church located at 59 Hollow Way. Hollow Way Medical Centre is nearby.

There is a "traffic filter" installed by Oxfordshire County Council to restrict traffic using this road.
