= Julia Gasper =

English independent academic

Julie Gasper

Member of Risinghurst and Sandhills Parish Council
- In office 2013–2021
- Ward: Sandhills

Personal details
- Party: English Democrats (2014-present)
- Other political affiliations: UKIP (2010 - 2014)

Julia Gasper is an English politician and independent scholar of 17th and 18th-century European literature. A right-wing activist, she is affiliated with the English Democrats and formerly belonged to the UK Independence Party (UKIP). A vocal critic of LGBT rights, she has attracted media attention for her negative comments regarding homosexuality and transgender identities.

In 1987, Gasper obtained a D.Phil. in English Literature from the University of Oxford. She converted her thesis, a study of Protestantism in the work of Thomas Dekker, into her first book. She later published books on Theodore of Corsica, Jean-Baptiste de Boyer, and Elizabeth Craven, while also contributing entries to the Oxford Dictionary of National Biography.

Active in Oxford local politics, during the 2010s she served as a parish councillor for Risinghurst and Sandhills. She stood unsuccessfully as UKIP's candidate for Oxford East in the 2010 general election and then for Quarry and Risinghurst in the 2012 Oxford City Council election. During the latter campaign, her negative comments regarding homosexuality and LGBT rights activism attracted press attention from PinkNews and the Sunday Mirror. Her views were criticised by UKIP leader Nigel Farage and she stepped down as local party chair. Defecting to the English Democrats, she unsuccessfully stood for them in the 2014 European Parliament election and a 2014 Oxford City Council by-election.

== Academic scholarship ==
After studying at Somerville College, in 1987 Gasper obtained a D.Phil in English Literature from the University of Oxford. Her thesis examined the Protestant plays of Elizabethan English playwright Thomas Dekker. In 1990, Clarendon Press published Gasper's work The Dragon and the Dove: The Plays of Thomas Dekker. Reviewing it in The Yearbook of English Studies, John Stachniewski described Gasper's book as "trenchant and well-informed" and agreed with her thesis that Dekker's dramatic works reflected a militant Protestant ideology. Less convinced by this thesis was T. H. Howard-Hill in The Review of English Studies, who thought that Gasper's work was "thoroughly researched, well documented, and densely written" but also "disjointed, digressive, repetitive, and rambling". John Harmon reviewed Gasper's book for the English Studies journal, describing it as "crisply researched" and "eminently readable" although felt that she argued "somewhat defensively" that scholars should take Dekker's work more seriously.

In 2013, the University of Delaware Press published Gasper's book, Theodore von Neuhoff, King of Corsica: The Man behind the Legend. Reviewing it for the European Review of History, José Miguel Escribano Páeza thought the work was "interesting" and "exciting" but believed that Gasper constructed a "hagiographic image" of von Neuhoff, unconvincingly portraying him as a "military genius" and "seeing things in black and white by frequently presenting Neuhoff and his followers as heroes fighting against villains."

Gasper also contributed fourteen articles on 17th- and 18th-century subjects to the Oxford Dictionary of National Biography.

== Political activity ==
Gasper was characterised, by the International Business Times, as a "right-wing political activist". She had founded the Windmill Road Residents' Association and the Friends of Bury Knowle Library and by 2012 was also a parish councillor for Risinghurst and Sandhills in Oxford.

=== UKIP candidacy: 2010–2013 ===
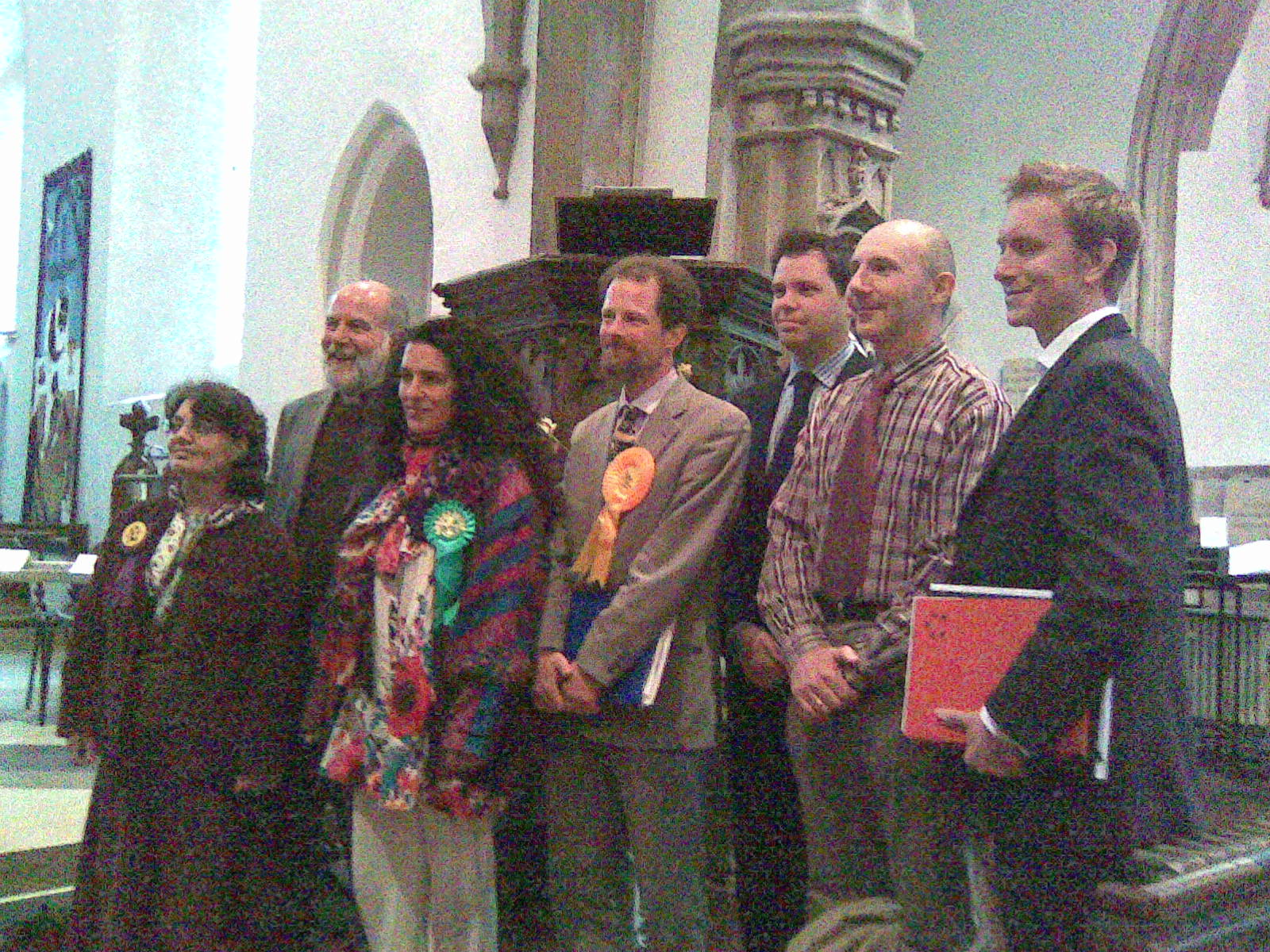
The 2010 parliamentary candidates for the Oxford East constituency (Gasper on far left)

In the 2010 general election, Gasper stood as the UK Independence Party (UKIP) candidate in Oxford East. Her platform promoted the UK's departure from the European Union, opposition to mass immigration, abolition of university tuition fees, and increases to the state pension. She came fifth, with 2.3% of the vote (1,202 votes). Gasper then attracted local press attention with the claim that, on polling today, someone entered her house and urinated in her hallway.

In the May 2012 elections for Oxford City Council, Gasper stood as UKIP's candidate in the Quarry and Risinghurst ward. During this campaign, LGBT-themed news service PinkNews reported on a 2010 blog post she had written, to which they had been alerted by an Oxford resident. There, Gasper described homosexuality as a chosen "form of behaviour" rather than an innate sexual orientation, claimed strong links between male homosexuality and paedophilia, and criticised gay people for "complaining constantly of persecution" and being insufficiently grateful to heterosexuals for creating them. Arguing that legal support for LGBT rights had "gone too far", she also described same-sex marriage and the adoption of children by same-sex couples as "wholly unacceptable". Her statements generated outrage, with a UKIP spokesperson commenting that while the party did not endorse Gasper's views on this issue, it supported her right to express them.

After the PinkNews coverage appeared, Gasper stated that she had received 200 death threats and was under police protection, which local police refused to confirm or deny. She compared herself to Salman Rushdie during The Satanic Verses controversy, and informed the Cherwell newspaper that she was the victim of "a malicious witch hunt". In her view, she told them, her opinions on LGBT issues were "very, very middle ground" and that she had said nothing homophobic. Roweena Russell, former chair of the International Gay Lesbian Bisexual Transgender Youth and Student Organisation, then emailed Gasper to discuss her views; Gasper responded that Russell should be institutionalised as mentally ill. Russell publicly criticised Gasper's views as "unacceptable," while Rafe Jeune, chair of Oxford's Pride parade, characterised the candidate's comments as "abhorrent" and "disgusting", adding that there was no evidence linking paedophilia and homosexuality.

==== 2013 coverage ====
In January 2013 the Sunday Mirror reported that, on a UKIP online forum, Gasper had described LGBT rights as a "lunatic's charter", claimed links between homosexuality and paedophilia, and stated that some homosexuals prefer sex with animals to sex with humans. The newspaper characterised the comments as "extremist and offensive" and described the forum as containing many homophobic and racist statements. When The Sunday Mirror asked for comment, Gasper responded: "I'm not going to talk about them. It's none of your business." Political commentator Nick Cohen, commenting in The Observer, described Gasper as an advocate of "dumb prejudice".

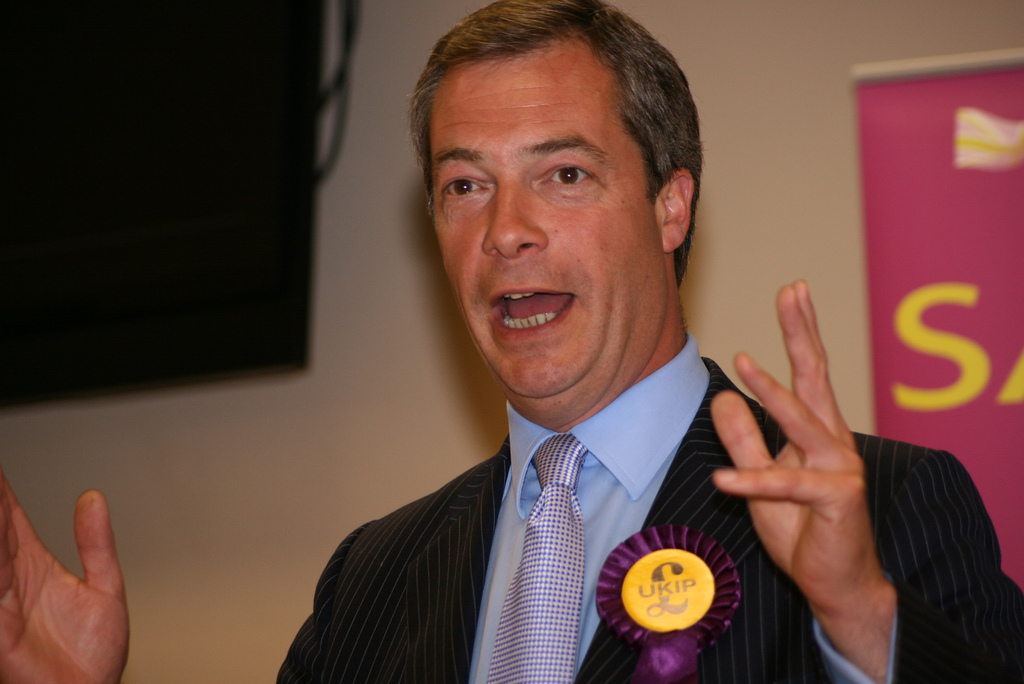
UKIP leader Nigel Farage: Gasper's "war against homosexuals is unacceptable".

Following the media coverage, the forum was shut down, Gasper resigned as chair of UKIP's Oxford branch, and several of her supporters were removed from the party's local committee. She was not expelled from the party itself. While describing herself as the victim of a "press vendetta", Gasper stated that the resignation was her own decision. A UKIP spokesperson commented that Gasper had stepped aside "to avoid doing herself or the party any more damage". UKIP leader Nigel Farage criticised Gasper's "war against homosexuals" as "unacceptable", while Olly Neville, former chair of UKIP's Young Independent wing, tweeted in support of Gasper's removal, stating that "her disgraceful views have no place as a rep[resentative] of a mainstream party".

Gasper then criticised UKIP as being "plagued with transsexuals", a reference to two trans women, Nikki Sinclaire and Kellie Maloney, who were party candidates. She described Maloney as "absolutely grotesque" and characterised her transition as "totally barmy – and how pathetic that he [sic] can do nothing better with his life." In May, former UKIP activist Colin Cortbus revealed to Cherwell that, in emails to him, Gasper had linked homosexuality and paedophilia, described Islam as "a severely oppressive ideology", and characterised the Quran as a "fascist" book comparable to Adolf Hitler's Mein Kampf.

In November 2013, Gasper faced criticism for her essay, "The Myth of the Homocaust", which she had uploaded to academia.edu. Here, Gasper argued that LGBT rights activists had fabricated the extent of the Nazi persecution of homosexuals. Olivia Marks-Woldman, chief executive of the Holocaust Memorial Day Trust, publicly criticised the essay: "Whilst it is important to recognise the differences between the ways the Nazis persecuted different groups, this shouldn't lead us to question the fact that thousands of gay men suffered appalling persecution because of their sexuality."

=== English Democrats: 2014–2016 ===
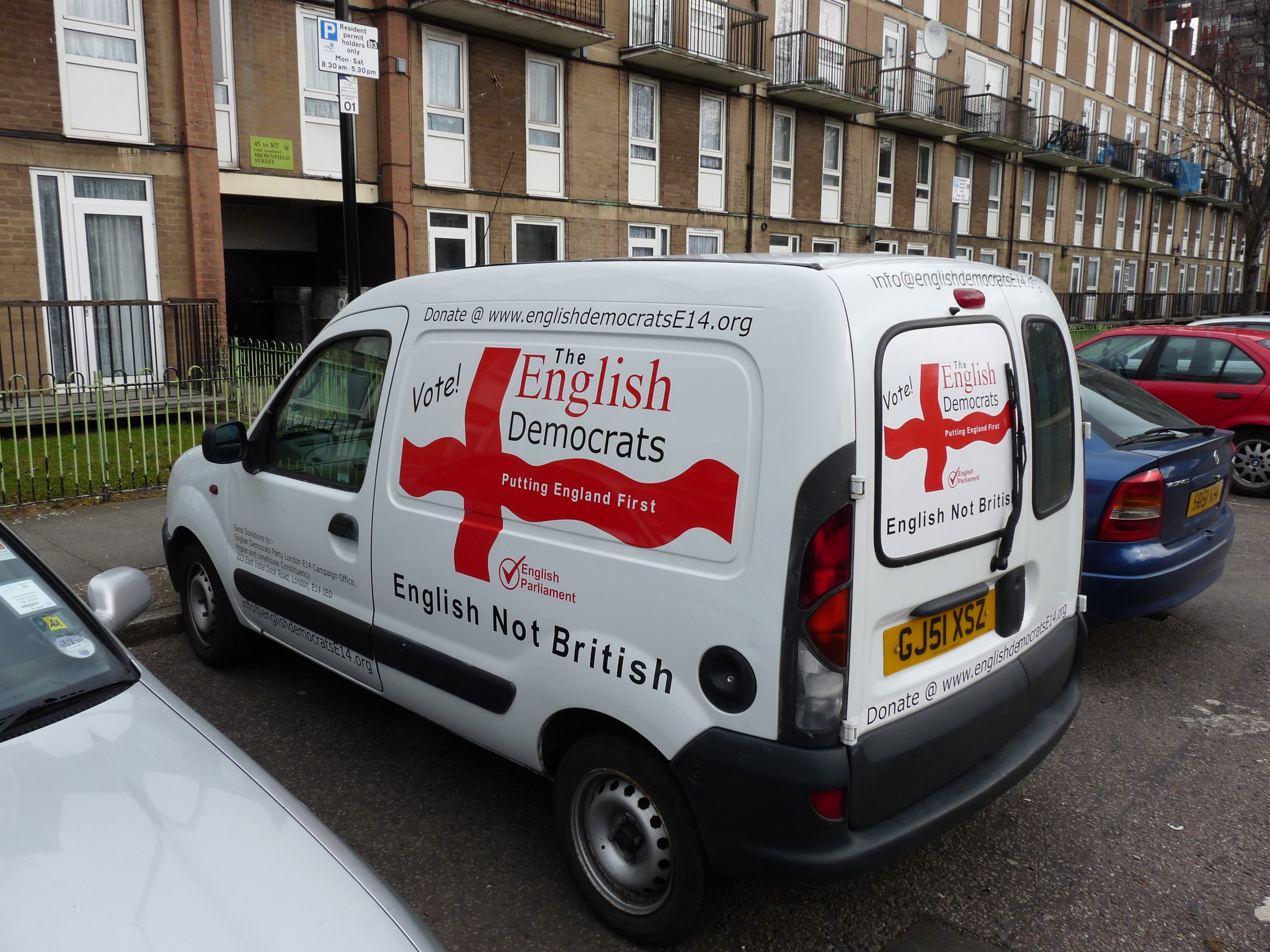
After leaving UKIP, Gasper joined the English Democrats (campaign van pictured)

Disillusioned with UKIP, Gasper defected to the English Democrats. In the May 2014 European Parliamentary elections, she stood as the party's candidate for the South East England region, gaining the votes of 0.76% of the electorate (17,771 votes). In August, she then stood as the English Democrat candidate in a by-election for the Quarry and Risinghurst seat on the Oxford City Council, coming last with 43 votes. In the May 2016 local election, Gasper retained her seat as parish councillor for Risinghurst and Sandhills.

Gasper's comments on LGBT issues continued to attract press attention. In April 2014, BBC News reported on her claim that, out of the 650 Members of Parliament (MPs), several hundred were gay and that this was a "violation of democracy". In the same post, she called for the gay dating app Grindr to be banned as a public health risk. Questioned by the BBC, the English Democrats' spokesman Steve Uncles defended Gasper, claiming that she was "factually correct" regarding the number of gay MPs. Conversely, her statistics were dismissed as "absurd" by the Oxford University Student Union's LGBT representative, who further criticised Gasper's "alarming prejudices".

The following month, Gasper commented on Brendan Eich's resignation as CEO of Mozilla after it was revealed that he had financially supported campaigns against same-sex marriage in California. Gasper claimed Eich had been "victimised by a queer mafia that takes a vindictive pleasure in bullying and abusing people" and that this "Homo fascism is a threat to fundamental human rights." Among those she deemed part of this campaign were US President Barack Obama, British Prime Minister David Cameron, Deputy Prime Minister Nick Clegg, the Labour Party, the United Nations, the European Union, Amnesty International, the Archbishop of Canterbury Justin Welby, the Bishop of Buckingham Alan Wilson, Pope Francis, the actor Daniel Radcliffe, all European and American universities, and media such as The Guardian, The Daily Mail, and The Huffington Post. A day later, she condemned World AIDS Day, claiming that it celebrated HIV/AIDS and homosexuality. The following week, she described campaigners for same-sex marriage as "queer thugs and gangsters" who "used violence, threats, censorship, abuse, and every form of dirty tactic". She hoped that "a twinge of guilt... kills them".

"So-called 'hate-crimes' you refer to in Russia, Uganda etc are frauds. Yes, frauds. Matthew Shepard was a fraud, David Kato was a fraud, gay-burning in Uganda is a fraud [...] they're all frauds."

— Julia Gasper, 2014.

Later in May, Gasper blogged that there were "far too many homosexual comedians on TV", focusing her criticism on Graham Norton, "the horrid little" Alan Carr, and "the unctuous" Stephen Fry. She also claimed that homosexuals were not persecuted anywhere in the world and that evidence to the contrary, such as the murders of Matthew Shepard and David Kato, was "fraudulent". PinkNews, she wrote, was a "mafia" that had placed the actor Rupert Everett on its "hit list", forcing him to obtain police protection. In October 2014, PinkNews founder Benjamin Cohen claimed that this constituted libel and threatened legal action. Gasper responded by reiterating her claims, stating that she was "proud" of her statements, adding: "I have morality on my side".

After singer David Bowie died in January 2016, Gasper blogged that he was a "famous queer Nazi" and that there was "a remarkable affinity" between Nazism and LGBT rights activism. The following month she criticised Oxford University's Bodleian Library for celebrating LGBT History Month; Gasper called this "a disgrace to Oxford" and maintained that "this unsavoury paedophile movement should have no publicity or promotion from any university." In February 2017, she again attracted attention after posting images of Jimmy Savile and Peter Jaconelli to her blog alongside the caption: "what could be more suitable for annual LGBT History Month than this heart-warming picture of two of Britain's most inveterate paedophiles hand in hand". Commenting in a Cherwell article, Samuel Rutishauser-Mills questioned why the media reported on Gasper's anti-LGBT comments, noting that as a parish councillor her "political significance is tenuous... and scarcely newsworthy or interesting." He argued that excessive coverage of such opinions made "extreme homophobia" seem more commonplace than it really is.

== Bibliography ==
Year of publication	Title	Publisher
1990	The Dragon and the Dove: The Plays of Thomas Dekker	Clarendon Press (Oxford)
2013	Theodore von Neuhoff, King of Corsica: The Man Behind the Legend	University of Delaware Press (Delaware)
2014	The Marquis d'Argens: A Philosophical Life	Lexington Press (Plymouth)
2018	Elizabeth Craven: Writer, Feminist and European	Vernon Press
