= Risinghurst and Sandhills =

Civil parish in Oxford England

Coordinates: 51°45′45″N 1°11′20″W

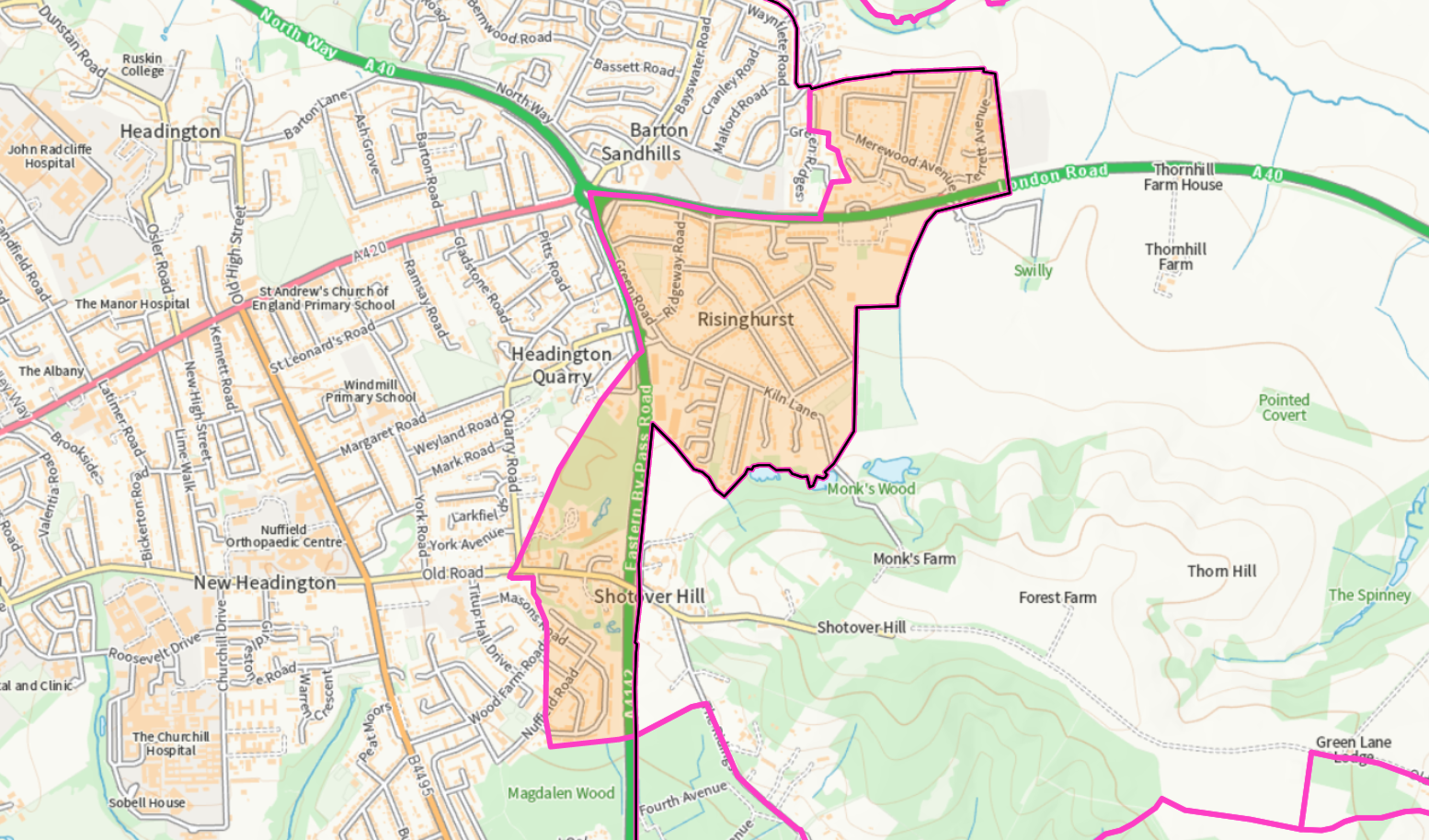
Boundaries of the civil parish

Risinghurst and Sandhills is a civil parish to the eastern edge of Oxford, England, just outside the Oxford Ring Road. According to the 2011 census, it had a population of 4,237. It borders Barton, Headington Quarry and Wood Farm.
