= Holy Trinity Church, Headington Quarry =

Church in Oxford, England

Coordinates: 51.7577°N 1.1980°W

Holy Trinity Church
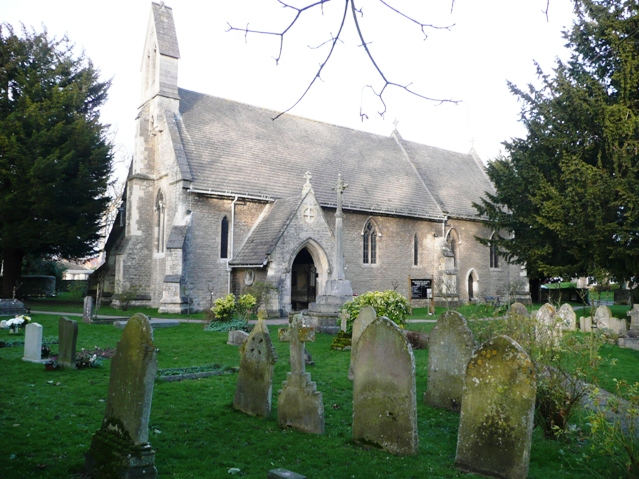
- Holy Trinity Church, Headington Quarry

- Location in Oxfordshire
- OS grid reference: SP 55453 06839
- Location: Headington Quarry, Oxfordshire
- Country: England
- Denomination: Anglican
- Website: Holy Trinity Church, Headington Quarry

History
- Status: Parish church

Architecture
- Functional status: Active
- Architectural type: Church

Administration
- Province: Canterbury
- Diocese: Diocese of Oxford
- Archdeaconry: Oxford
- Parish: Headington Quarry

Clergy
- Vicar: The Revd Martin Little

Holy Trinity Church, Headington Quarry, is located in the village of Headington Quarry, Oxford, England. It is an active Anglican parish church in the Diocese of Oxford.

== History ==
The church, designed by George Gilbert Scott, who also designed the Martyrs' Memorial and the Exeter College Chapel, was built in 1848–49, to serve the spiritual needs of those living and working in the then-active quarry. Its foundation stone was laid on 19 June 1848 by Samuel Wilberforce, the son of William Wilberforce and then Bishop of Oxford, who consecrated the building on completion.

The Lewis brothers, C. S. Lewis and Warren Lewis, began attending here in 1930 and remained active in this church until their deaths, C. S. Lewis in 1963 and W. H. Lewis in 1973.

Above the altar is the Christ in Glory stained glass window, installed in 1951 as a memorial to those who died in World War II. It was designed by Sir J. Ninian Comper. The cloth behind the altar was hung in 1994, and represents the three angels who visited Abraham according to Genesis 18. The chancel organ was built by Kenneth Tickell and installed in 1992.

The church is known for its Narnia window, which features images from C. S. Lewis's Chronicles of Narnia. It was commissioned from Sally Scott, a painter and glass engraver, and installed in the north aisle in 1991. It was bequeathed by George and Kathleen Howe (née Clark), who lived at 38 Grovelands Road in Risinghurst close to the Lewis brothers in memory of their children, William G. and Gillian Margaret, who both died young. Willie died in 1955, aged 16, and Gillian shortly after her birth in 1945. Both are buried in the churchyard.

The window contains a lamp post, the word "Narnia," Glimfeather the owl, the flying horse Fledge, the sword, shield, and bottle of cordial from the story of The Lion, the Witch and the Wardrobe, the Dawn Treader, the castle Cair Paravel, Susan's horn and bow with quiver, and talking animals. In the top left and right hand corners are the arms of John Williams, 1st Baron Williams of Thame, who founded Lord Williams's School which Willie attended at the time of his death.

== Graveyard ==
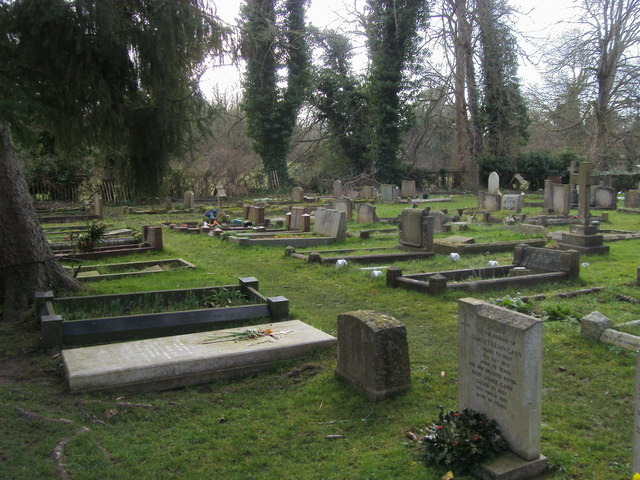
Churchyard of Holy Trinity, Headington Quarry. The grave of C. S. Lewis is marked by the white slab on the left.

Attached to the church is a small graveyard, particularly noted for including the grave of C. S. Lewis, who died on 22 November 1963. The epitaph on his tombstone, chosen by his brother Warren Hamilton Lewis (buried in the same grave after his own death on 9 April 1973) and taken from Shakespeare's King Lear, reads "Men must endure their going hence." This quotation was the quotation on the family calendar the day the mother of Warren and Clive Lewis died, 23 August 1908.

Also notable is the grave of William Kimber, the "father of English Morris" as his tombstone reads. Mrs. Janie Moore, the adopted "mother" of C. S. Lewis, who died on 12 January 1951, is also buried in the churchyard.

The churchyard contains the war graves of six British Army soldiers of World War I.
