= St Andrew's Church, Headington =

St Andrew's Church
- Saint Andrew's Church, Old Headington
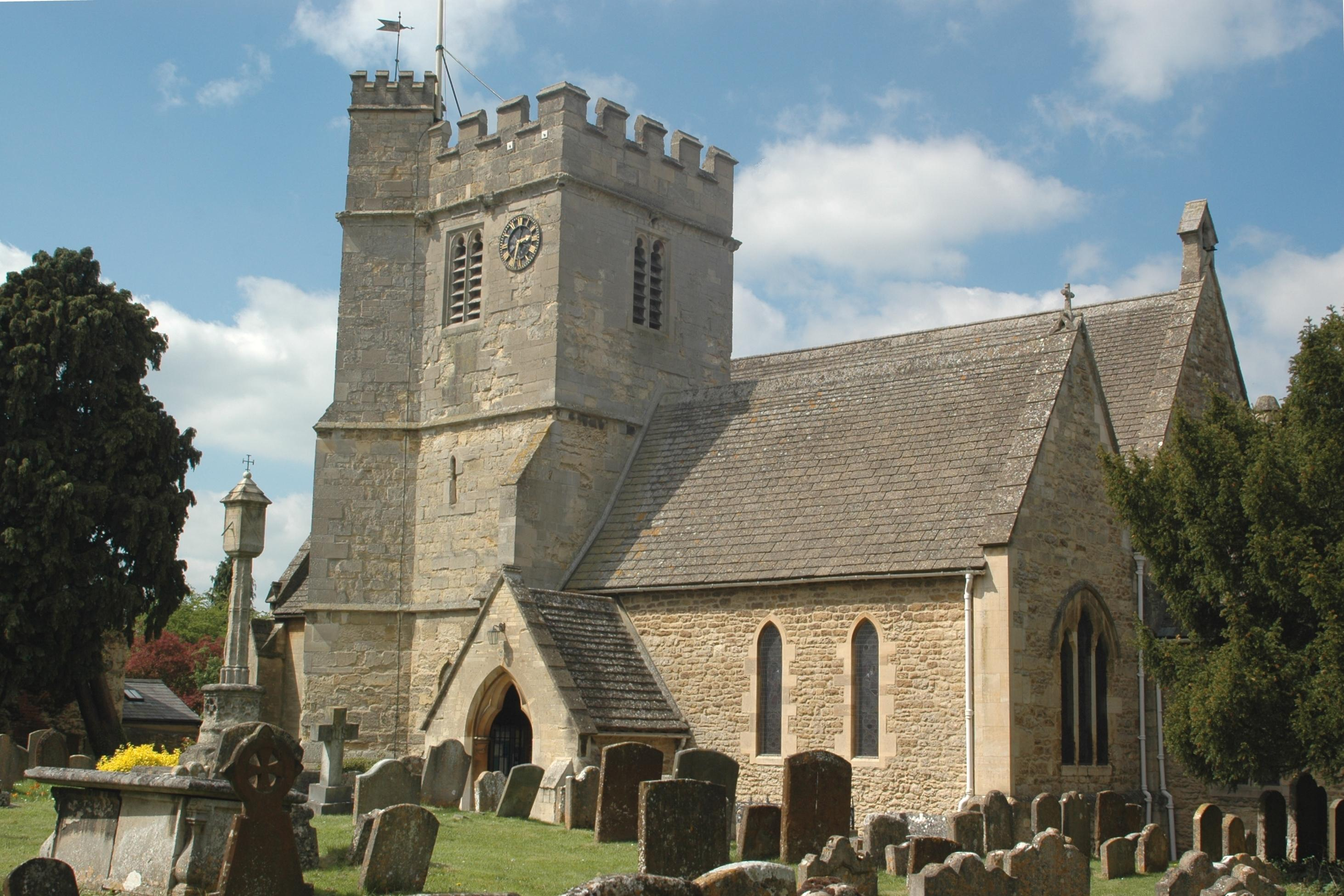
- View of St Andrew's Church in Old Headington.
- St Andrew's Church
- 51°45′53.2″N 1°12′43.9″W
- OS grid reference: SP 54465 07635
- Location: St Andrew's Road, Old Headington, Oxfordshire OX3 9DL
- Country: England
- Denomination: Church of England
- Churchmanship: Liberal Catholic
- Website: www.standrewsheadington.co.uk

History
- Founded: c.1160
- Dedication: Saint Andrew

Architecture
- Style: Norman architecture

Administration
- Province: Province of Canterbury
- Diocese: Diocese of Oxford
- Archdeaconry: Archdeaconry of Oxford
- Deanery: Cowley

Clergy
- Vicar: Fr Darren McFarland

St Andrew's Church, Headington is a Church of England parish church in the village of Old Headington, Oxfordshire, England, now absorbed as part of the suburb of Headington in the city of Oxford. The church building is located in St Andrew's Road. It is a Grade II* listed building.

== History ==
The church was built c.1160 in the Norman style. A south aisle and tower were added in the 13th century. In 1862, J. C. Buckler lengthened the nave.

=== Present day ===
The parish stood in the Traditional Catholic tradition of the Church of England. The parish had passed Resolutions A and B in 2010 to show that it rejected the ordination of women. As of 2018, however, the Revd Jennifer Strawbridge is listed as "assisting clergy" on the church's website. By 2024, the church had moved in to a liberal Catholic tradition.

== Gallery ==
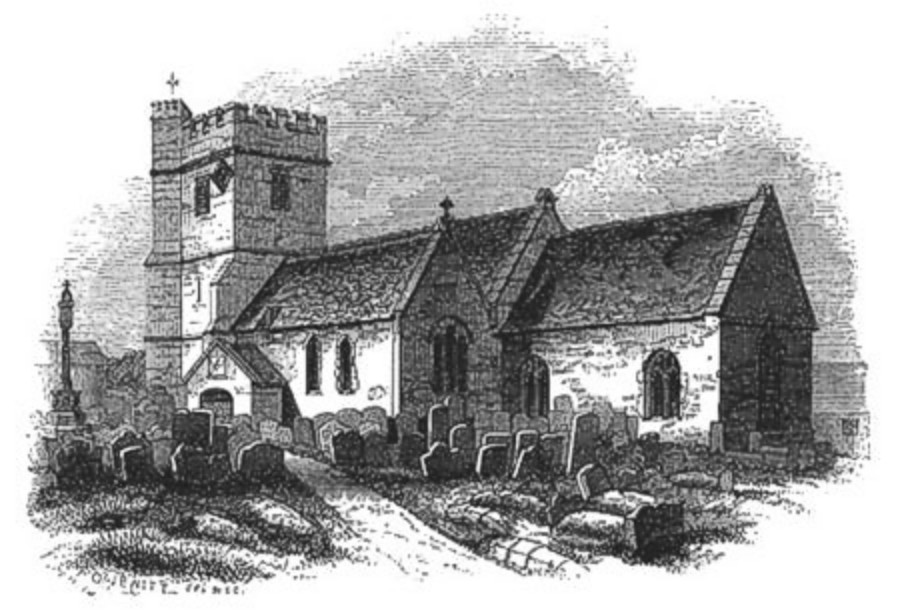
1842 engraving by Orlando Jewitt

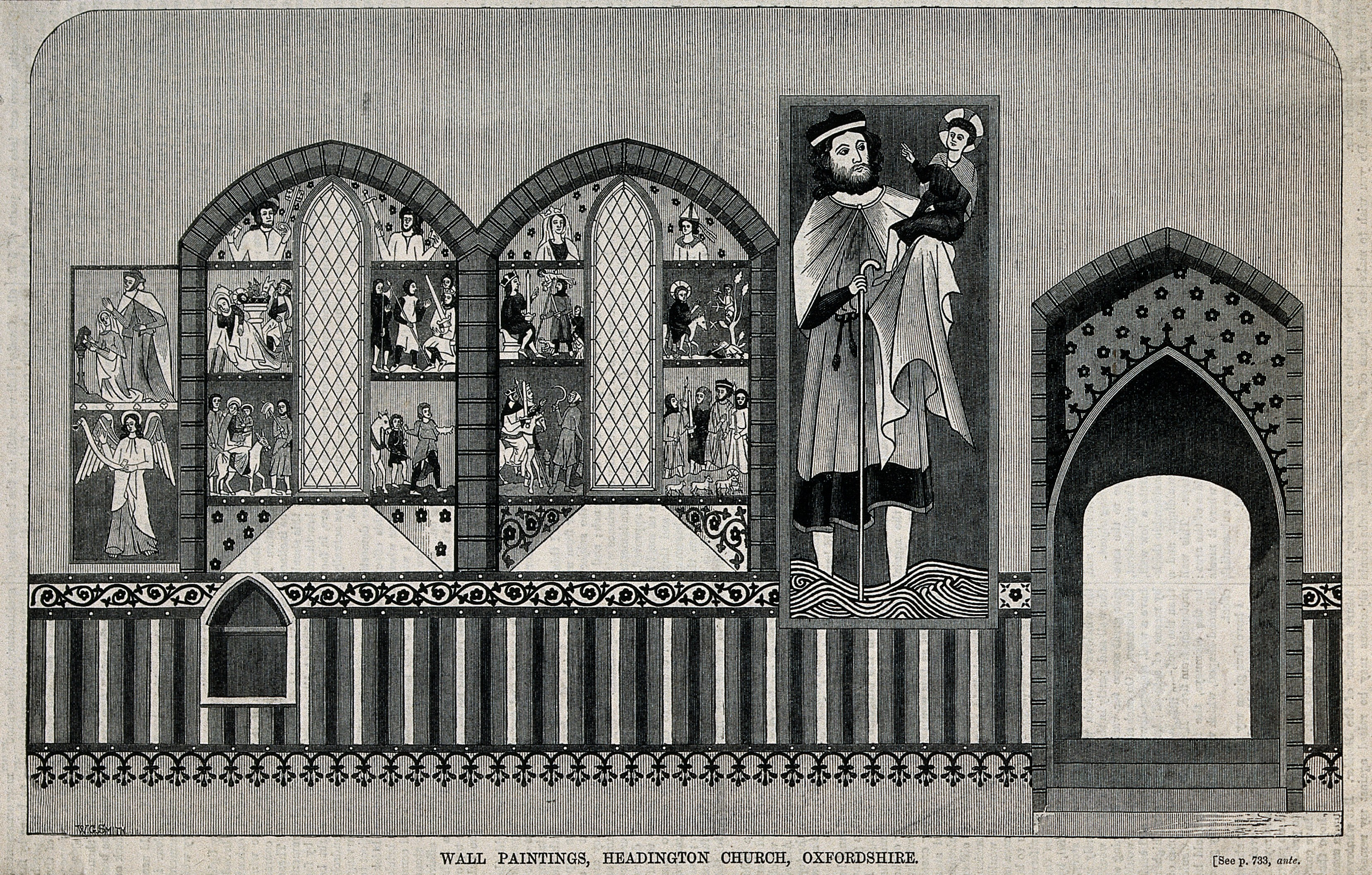
Wood engraving of Saint Christopher by W. G. Smith

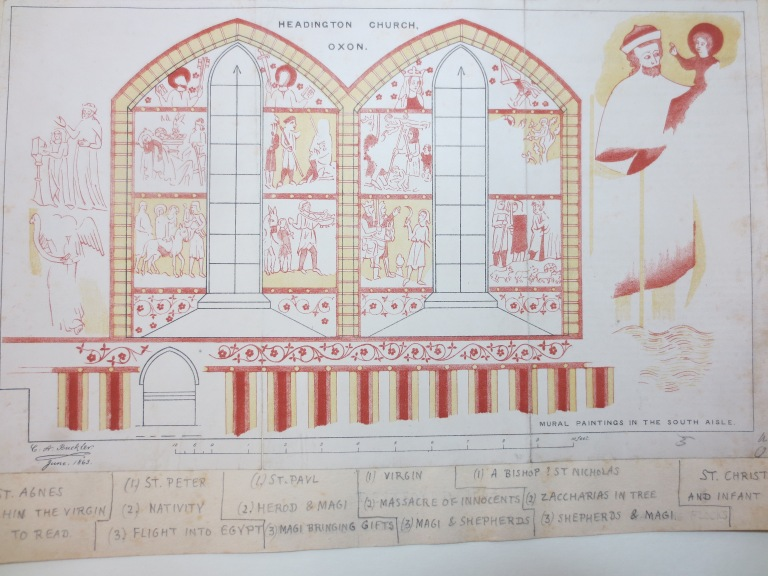
Sketch by Charles Alban Buckler

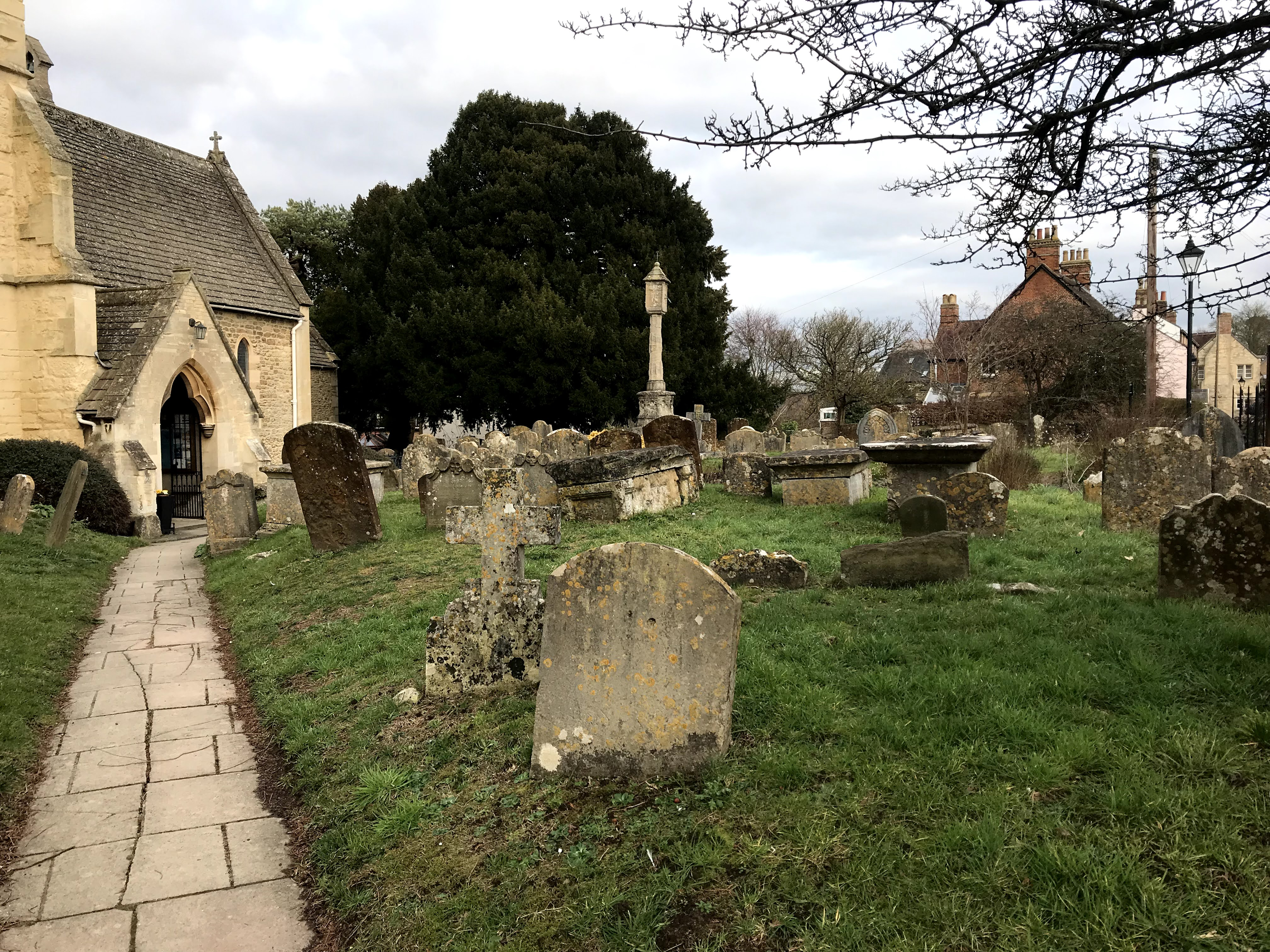
The cemetery

== See also ==
- List of churches in Oxford
- St Andrew's Church, Oxford
