= Risinghurst =

Suburb of Oxford, England

Coordinates: 51.76°N 1.19°W

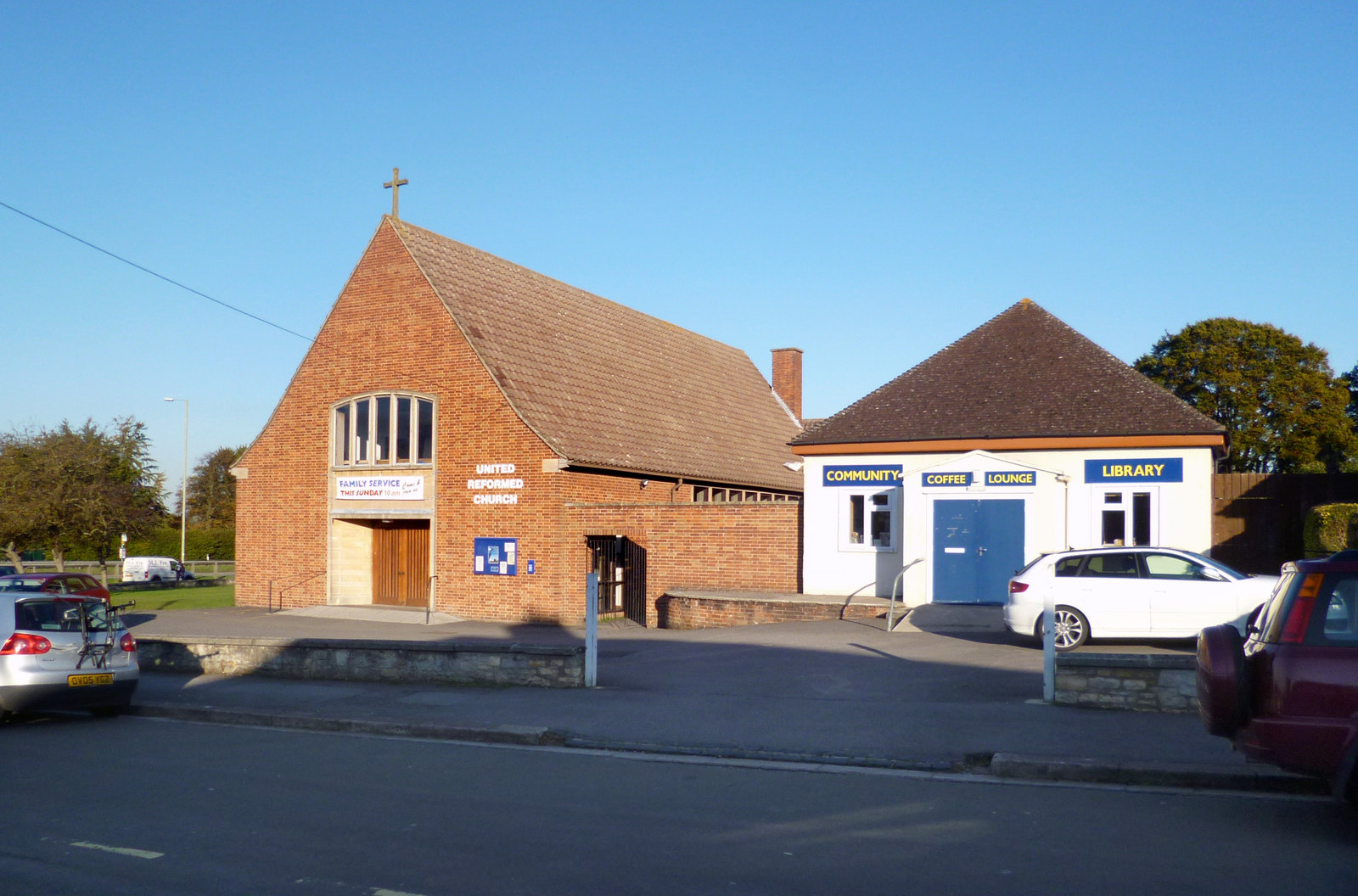
- Risinghurst Church and Library

- Location within Oxfordshire
- OS grid reference: SP559070
- Civil parish: Risinghurst and Sandhills
- District: Oxford
- Shire county: Oxfordshire
- Region: South East
- Country: England
- Sovereign state: United Kingdom
- Post town: Oxford
- Postcode district: OX3
- Dialling code: 01865
- Police: Thames Valley
- Fire: Oxfordshire
- Ambulance: South Central
- UK Parliament: Oxford East

Risinghurst is a suburb of Oxford, England 3 miles (4.8 km) east of the city centre, just outside the Oxford Ring Road. It is near to Headington, Barton and Wood Farm. It was built during the interwar period to relieve the housing shortage from working-class people moving to cities, in this case to take advantage of the motor industry in Oxford.

During the 1930s around 600 houses were built in sets of semi-detached units. Two rows of shops and two pubs were built in The Roundway. A library was also built, and later a church.

== History ==
The name Risinghurst means 'rising ground towards the hurst [or wooded hill]', reflecting the fact that Risinghurst was built on rising land running upwards towards Shotover Hill.

=== Roman Era ===
A Roman road between Silchester and Towcester passes through Risinghurst. Evidence of Romano-British occupation was discovered during clay-quarrying in the 19th century.

Finds from in 1898 include building stones, gravel floors and pottery. They were mostly dated to the 3rd and 4th centuries but some 2nd century samian ware was also found. The surface of a road was also sectioned, lying parallel to the main road but over 100 yards (91 m) to the east; this consisted of a spread of stones about 20 feet (6.1 m) wide and about 1 foot (30 cm) thick in the centre, tapering to 'almost nothing at the edges'. Coins recovered from the site and recorded by Harding in 1939 ranged from issues of Tiberius (AD 14–37) to Honorius (AD 395–423).

=== Modern history ===
In the 17th century a there was a small settlement in Risinghurst – which still remains. Brick and tile works were established, which remained until the early 20th century. The majority of Risinghurst was farmland and was home to Magdalen Farm and Shotover Lodge, which was renamed to Forest Lodge by the 20th century.

Until the late 18th century, the road between Oxford and London went across Shotover Hill. Then a turnpike was opened on a new route further north, with upwards of 80 coaches and the mail coach using it daily. It was later named the A40 road and now forms the northern boundary of Risinghurst. An 18th century turnpike milestone can still be seen on the central reservation near Thornhill Park and Ride.

An accident happened in 1939 when Trevor Thomas, a six-year old boy, died after a practice bomb fell from an RAF plane and went through the roof. He was in bed when the accident happened. The incident was reported widely in the UK press, however many of the reports incorrectly gave the boy's name as Trevor Love with his parents being Frederick and Margaret. However, he and his brother David were evacuees from London.

In the 1930s the Risinghurst estate was built primarily by Benfield and Loxley as pebble-dashed semi-detached three-bedroom houses. Further houses were built in the 1970s to 1990s. In 1958 work started on the Eastern Bypass, which cut off Risinghurst from Headington Quarry – locally considered part of Risinghurst. Which left Risinghurst separated from the rest of the city, though, in 1992, Risinghurst was included in the Oxford City Council borders.

There is no school in Risinghurst, though all of Risinghurst is in the Sandhills Community Primary School and Wheatley Park Primary School catchment areas. No plans for a community centre were original made, however in the late 1940s a residents group obtained a former army building near Wheatley and it was dismantled and rebuilt in Risinghurst.

== Political ==
In 1956, the Risinghurst and Sandhills Parish Council was formed, breaking from the bigger Forest Hill and Shotover Parish Council. Within Oxfordshire County Council, Risinghurst is part of the Quarry and Risinghurst Ward, which is represented by two councillors. It is part of the Oxford East parliamentary constituency.

== Places and people of interest ==
Risinghurst was home to the author C. S. Lewis, who lived in a house called the Kilns – named after kilns from the Roman era that were excavated there – for 33 years until his death in 1963. During his time in Risinghurst he wrote the Narnia books, which were published between 1950 and 1956. Behind the house is now a nature reserve, but was at the time a garden, which is believed to have inspired both Narnia and for Tolkien's Middle-earth.

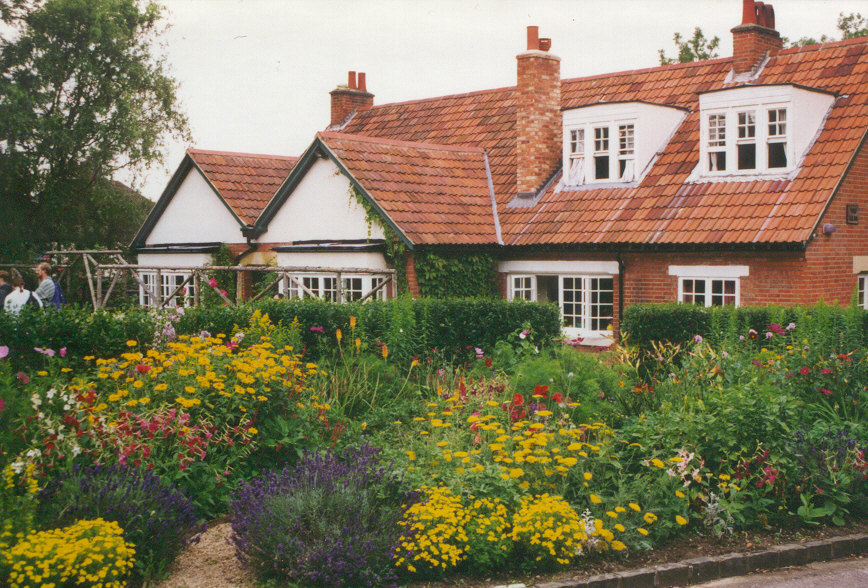
The Kilns in 1997

In 1969 The Berkshire, Buckinghamshire, and Oxfordshire Wildlife Trust bought the lake and woodland behind the Kilns. The Trust describes the woods as follows

'The steeply rising woodland includes beech, birch, alder, sycamore and larch. Dotted around the reserve are large sandstone boulders known as doggers on the slopes in the trees. The pond is full of aquatic plants and many toads migrate here to spawn in spring, when the garden is also full of birdsong. Moorhens and coots regularly nest here and other visitors include herons, kingfishers and warblers. Giant horsetail grows at the margins of a stream which flows in from the east and there are spectacular displays of dragonflies and damselflies in summer'

The California-based C.S. Lewis Foundation bought the Kilns in the 1980s for £130,000 and has restored it to its original 1930s appearance.

The C.S. Lewis Nature Reserve is part of the old Royal Forest of Shotover. Behind the reserve is Shotover Country Park, which is partly designated as a Site of Special Scientific Interest. Shotover is one of the highest limestone hills that form the valley of Oxford. Large parts of South Oxfordshire can be seen from Shotover Hill and over 300,000 people visit each year.

Mark Gardener, frontman of the shoe gaze band Ride, lived at No. 58 Ringwood Road as a child during the 1970s.

Risinghurst is home to the Risinghurst Cricket Club.

== Businesses and services ==
The centre of Risinghurst is Downside Road, home to The Ampleforth, the local public house built in 1938, by the now defunct Ind Coope. Risinghurst's Grovelands Road Sports Ground is home to Headington Youth Football Club. In another part of Risinghurst is a harpsichord factory: Robert Goble & Son is a maker of harpsichords, clavichords and spinets. The company is at Greatstones, a large house further up the lane that leads off The Kilns. Robert Goble (1903–1991) started making recorders and harpsichords here during the late 1940s when he moved to Greatstones from Haslemere. By 1954, they stopped making recorders and concentrated on harpsichords becoming an internationally known name. Historically, back in the 1930s and 40s, a small weaving company operated at the top of Kiln Lane called Samarkand Hand Weavers; C S Lewis in a diary noted that Warnie had, in 1934, bought two ties from them.

On the Headington Roundabout corner of the estate – known as The Roundway – is another row of shops and a McDonald's fast food restaurant. This used to be the Shotover Arms built in 1931 as another Ind Coope pub. A large mock Tudor building with black timbering, it was converted into a hotel in 1957 when the southern by-pass was built. It had several bars—all open to the public—and a large off-licence. What is now a Carphone Warehouse store was originally a filling station. A dentist can also be found close by but so far as is known, there was never a doctors' surgery. Back in 1956, Kelly's Directory records these – a typical set of local retail businesses. At the end of Kiln Lane and the back of Shelley Close is a number of light engineering units. (In 1956 this included A C Carter, builders, and the Oxford Joinery and Woodworking Company.)

Public transport for the estate was provided for decades by the Number 2 bus route that originally ran from Risinghurst via (Oxford High Street and Cornmarket) to Summertown and Kidlington. In 2005, this was terminated as traffic problems were causing severe disruption to the timetable. Now the Number 9 runs from Downside Road, outside the pub, to the centre of Oxford, on Mondays through Saturdays every 30 minutes from about 7 am through to about 7 pm, and after that hourly until 11 pm. There is an hourly bus service on Sundays, which was introduced in July 2011, following numerous appeals by residents for an extended bus service.

== Church ==
Risinghurst has one church: Collinwood Road United Reformed Church. The congregation first came together during the Second World War, meeting at various locations in the district under the supervision of Temple Cowley Congregational Church. In 1945 they signed a covenant which formed Collinwood Congregational Church and, in September 1949, the first church building—an Orlitt prefabricated concrete structure—was opened. Over 200 people attended the ceremony as the Rev. John Philips unlocked the door and participated in the service led by the Rev. A.R. Vine. The following day, the first Children's Service was held. In 1951 the Rev. Tom Stiff (1920–2002) was appointed as pastor. He and his wife Peggy lived in a caravan until the manse was completed in 1953. He retired in 1986 but remained a member of the church, and in 2001 celebrated 50 years association with Collinwood Road.

The original church building is now used as a hall. The current church itself was built in the early 1960s and is a simple but effective expression of church architecture. Fund raising for this new church was launched through a 'Buy a Brick' campaign. Tom Stiff and churchgoers collected money at various points in Headington in 1959 such as outside the Westminster Bank at 91 High Street Headington, and in Barton, Risinghurst and Sandhills, holding up posters that read, 'Be a brick – Buy a brick – Bob a Brick.' Passers-by were urged to give a 'bob' or 1/- to pay for one brick. Two months after the start of the campaign, £187.18s had been raised towards the £3,000 target.

A second church hall was built in the 1980s. In 1972 the Church became part of the United Reformed Church (a union of Congregationalists, Presbyterians and later Churches of Christ) which is the now the main representative of the Reformed tradition in England. The Church is growing, increasingly multicultural, and committed to inter-generational worship, where children are engaged and involved in worship. The Church is currently in ministerial vacancy but still provides Christian worship every Sunday led by visiting ministers, elders or the outreach worker. This worship takes place at 10 am every Sunday morning in the sanctuary, except for the first Sunday of the month when they meet in the Church hall for All-Age worship. There is also a monthly junior Church where children are invited to go into the coffee lounge where they interactively explore different bible stories through arts and crafts, music, games and discussion.

The Church currently provides a number of services to the community, including a weekly lunch-club every Tuesday for those aged 55 or over, a coffee lounge and library which serves as a warm welcome space and is open for anyone to drop in for conversation, coffee, tea and biscuits most weekdays from 10am-1pm, and a community breakfast morning on the first Saturday of every month where you can enjoy a full English breakfast from 9:30-11am. The Church also runs special worship services and community events throughout the year, such as their annual Community Fun Day, children's events during school holidays, Christmas, Easter and Harvest services, details of which can be found on their website. The building is currently shared with three other congregations: the Presbyterian Church of Korea, the Punjabi-speaking Asian Evangelical Church, and a Portuguese-speaking (largely Brazilian) Assemblies of God church. They enjoy annual joint services where all four congregations gather together to worship.

== Sources ==
- Snow, Peter (1991). Oxford Observed. John Murray (Publishers). ISBN 0-7195-4707-5.
