= 2012 Oxford City Council election =

2012 UK local government election

Results of the 2012 Oxford City Council election

Elections for Oxford City Council were held on Thursday 3 May 2012. As Oxford City Council is elected by halves, one seat in each of the 24 wards was up for election.

Overall turnout was 29.4%, down from 61.7% in 2010. However, the 2010 election was held on the same day as the general election, accounting for the unusually high turnout in that year. The lowest turnout (17.5%) was in Northfield Brook ward and the highest (42.5%) in Iffley Fields.

== Results summary ==
Oxford local election result 2012
Party	Seats	Gains	Losses	Net gain/loss	Seats %	Votes %	Votes	+/−
Labour	16	4	1	+3	66.7	42.4	13,852	+7.9
Liberal Democrats	4	0	3	-3	16.7	18.5	6,034	−12.1
Green	3	1	1	0	12.5	21.3	6,948	+7.3
Independent	1	1	0	+1	4.2	2.7	877	+1.7
Conservative	0	0	0	0	0.0	14.6	4,764	-5.0
UKIP	0	0	0	0	0.0	0.5	166	+0.3

Note: three UKIP candidates stood in this election, compared with one in 2010 and none in 2008. The last remaining councillor for the Independent Working Class Association, in Northfield Brook ward, stood down at this election; the seat was taken by the Labour Party.

This result had the following consequences for the total number of seats on the Council after the elections:

Party	Previous council	Staying councillors	Seats up for election	Election result	New council
Labour	26	13	13	16	29
Liberal Democrats	16	9	7	4	13
Green	5	2	3	3	5
Independent Working Class	1	0	1	0	0
Independent	0	0	0	1	1
Total	48	24	24	24	48

== Results by ward ==
Map of the Oxford Wards

=== Barton and Sandhills ===
Party	Candidate	Votes	%	±%
Labour	Mike Rowley	758	66.7	+9.6
Conservative	Graham Lovelock	168	14.8	+8.9
Green	Mary-Jane Sareva	122	10.7	+2.6
Liberal Democrats	Alexander Cibulskis	88	7.7	−15.1
Turnout		1146	22.54	
Labour gain from Liberal Democrats		Swing		

=== Blackbird Leys ===
Party	Candidate	Votes	%	±%
Labour	Val Smith	737	85.4	+31.1
Conservative	David Hearn	54	6.3	−0.3
Green	Sarah Pethybridge	40	4.6	+2.2
Liberal Democrats	Alasdair Murray	32	3.7	+2.0
Turnout		865	20.81	−0.2
Labour hold		Swing		

=== Carfax ===
Party	Candidate	Votes	%	±%
Labour	Anne-Marie Canning	288	32.4	+15.1
Green	Adam Ramsay	235	26.4	+6.6
Liberal Democrats	Duncan Stott	207	23.3	−12.4
Conservative	Tim Patmore	159	17.9	−9.8
Turnout		902	20.27	
Labour gain from Liberal Democrats		Swing		

=== Churchill ===
Party	Candidate	Votes	%	±%
Labour	Mark Lygo	767	71.0	+29.3
Green	Julian Faultless	130	12.0	+8.7
Conservative	Siddo Deva	106	9.8	–2.4
Liberal Democrats	Ruth Rundle	77	7.1	–9.0
Turnout		1086	21.62	
Labour hold		Swing		

=== Cowley ===
Party	Candidate	Votes	%	±%
Labour	Helen O'Hara	626	51.6	+3.4
Green	Clare Cochrane	276	22.8	+10.3
Conservative	Judith Harley	196	16.2	−1.2
Liberal Democrats	Mike Tait	115	9.4	−6.1
Turnout		1217	26.84	
Labour hold		Swing		

=== Cowley Marsh ===
Party	Candidate	Votes	%	±%
Labour	Saj Malik	666	50.1	−1.3
Green	Kevin Meaney	467	35.1	+24.9
Conservative	Gary Dixon	122	9.2	+0.5
Liberal Democrats	Ben Maconick	75	5.6	−24.1
Turnout		1338	27.77	
Labour hold		Swing		

=== Headington ===
Party	Candidate	Votes	%	±%
Liberal Democrats	Ruth Wilkinson	983	53.7	+18.3
Labour	Jane Darke	557	30.5	+13.8
Conservative	Mark Bhagwandin	178	9.7	−24.7
Green	Richard Howarth	111	6.1	−7.4
Turnout		1834	41.35	
Liberal Democrats hold		Swing		

=== Headington Hill and Northway ===
Party	Candidate	Votes	%	±%
Labour	Roy Darke	589	48.1	+8.8
Conservative	Thomas Kelley	273	22.3	−8.7
Green	Sietske Boeles	156	12.7	+8.4
Liberal Democrats	Stephen Tall	110	9.0	−17.4
UKIP	Nicholas Fell	97	7.9	+7.9
Turnout		1232	25.24	−4.0
Labour hold		Swing		

=== Hinksey Park ===
Party	Candidate	Votes	%	±%
Labour	Oscar Van Nooijen	906	60.0	+7.8
Green	Judy Chipchase	331	21.9	−1.5
Conservative	Simon Mort	172	11.4	−1.9
Liberal Democrats	Catherine Hodgkinson	101	6.7	−4.4
Turnout		1518	32.34	
Labour hold		Swing		

=== Holywell ===
Party	Candidate	Votes	%	±%
Green	Sam Hollick	356	39.5	+21.0
Labour	Alex Harvey	204	22.6	+9.0
Liberal Democrats	Robin McGhee	197	21.8	−23.6
Conservative	Robert Sargent	145	16.1	−8.0
Turnout		923	21.82	
Green gain from Liberal Democrats		Swing		

=== Iffley Fields ===
Party	Candidate	Votes	%	±%
Green	Elise Benjamin	896	49.5	−5.2
Labour	Richard Tarver	795	43.9	+15.4
Conservative	Neil Prestidge	60	3.3	−6.8
Liberal Democrats	Doug Hale	58	3.2	+3.2
Turnout		1816	42.49	
Green hold		Swing		

=== Jericho and Osney ===
Party	Candidate	Votes	%	±%
Labour	Colin Cook	835	54.4	+1.2
Green	Peter Furtado	337	22.0	+5.5
Conservative	Bill Wilson	214	13.9	+1.2
Liberal Democrats	Catherine Hilliard	149	9.7	−7.9
Turnout		1538	30.53	
Labour hold		Swing		

=== Littlemore ===
Party	Candidate	Votes	%	±%
Labour	John Tanner	686	59.4	+8.7
Conservative	Carolyn Evans	202	17.5	−7.3
Liberal Democrats	Dorian Hancock	137	11.9	+1.1
Green	Matthew Sellwood	130	11.3	−2.4
Turnout		1161	24.44	
Labour hold		Swing		

=== Lye Valley ===
Party	Candidate	Votes	%	±%
Labour	Pat Kennedy	724	62.8	+2.8
Green	John Kentish	182	15.8	+5.6
Conservative	James McGee	161	14.0	−6.9
Liberal Democrats	Mark Wheeler	85	7.4	−1.5
Turnout		1165	22.86	
Labour hold		Swing		

=== Marston ===
Party	Candidate	Votes	%	±%
Independent	Mick Haines	877	45.8	+25.2
Labour	Louise Upton	636	33.2	−1.3
Conservative	Duncan Hatfield	195	10.2	−4.0
Green	Alistair Morris	122	6.4	+1.3
Liberal Democrats	Sam Fowkes	84	4.4	−21.2
Turnout		1919	40.41	
Independent gain from Labour		Swing		

=== North ===
Party	Candidate	Votes	%	±%
Labour	James Fry	516	33.4	+18.6
Green	Sushila Dhall	385	24.9	+7.2
Liberal Democrats	John Howson	353	22.8	−14.4
Conservative	Samantha Mandrup	291	18.8	−11.5
Turnout		1548	34.82	
Labour gain from Liberal Democrats		Swing		

=== Northfield Brook ===
Party	Candidate	Votes	%	±%
Labour	Steve Curran	564	73.6	+33.9
Green	Alison Williams	73	9.5	+5.8
Liberal Democrats	Amber Thomas	68	8.9	+4.2
Conservative	Pat Jones	61	8.0	+1.4
Turnout		770	17.51	
Labour gain from Ind. Working Class		Swing		

=== Quarry and Risinghurst ===
Party	Candidate	Votes	%	±%
Labour	Laurence Baxter	848	49.5	+11.9
Liberal Democrats	Roz Smith	411	24.0	−4.0
Conservative	Allen Mills	310	18.1	−11.7
Green	Raymond Hitchins	76	4.4	+0.3
UKIP	Julia Gasper	69	4.0	+4.0
Turnout		1722	36.56	
Labour hold		Swing		

=== Rose Hill and Iffley ===
Party	Candidate	Votes	%	±%
Labour	Edward Turner	871	61.9	+7.1
Liberal Democrats	Peter Wilkinson	214	15.2	+0.1
Green	Paul Skinner	181	12.9	−0.4
Conservative	John Walsh	140	10.0	−6.8
Turnout		1417	31.58	
Labour hold		Swing		

=== St Clement's ===
Party	Candidate	Votes	%	±%
Labour	Bev Clack	595	42.8	+18.4
Green	Hafiz Ladell	501	36.1	−12.5
Conservative	Elizabeth Mills	165	11.9	−1.3
Liberal Democrats	Mohsin Khan	99	7.1	−6.7
UKIP	Ian MacDonald	29	2.1	+2.1
Turnout		1397	26.29	
Labour gain from Green		Swing		

=== St Margaret's ===
Party	Candidate	Votes	%	±%
Liberal Democrats	Gwynneth Royce	474	34.5	+1.1
Conservative	Vernon Porter	353	25.7	−1.2
Green	Ann Duncan	350	25.5	−2.3
Labour	Lincoln Hill	198	14.4	+2.4
Turnout		1381	31.89	
Liberal Democrats hold		Swing		

=== St Mary's ===
Party	Candidate	Votes	%	±%
Green	Craig Simmons	578	48.0	−10.9
Labour	Sabir Mirza	509	42.3	+21.2
Conservative	George Harnett	76	6.3	−5.3
Liberal Democrats	James King	40	3.3	−6.9
Turnout		1212	27.88	
Green hold		Swing		

=== Summertown ===
Party	Candidate	Votes	%	±%
Liberal Democrats	Stuart McCready	753	41.9	−2.3
Green	John Coleman	418	23.3	+2.6
Conservative	Jonathan Gittos	379	21.1	−4.0
Labour	Christopher Gray	246	13.7	+3.7
Turnout		1801	36.34	
Liberal Democrats hold		Swing		

=== Wolvercote ===
Party	Candidate	Votes	%	±%
Liberal Democrats	Michael Gotch	655	33.9	−0.2
Conservative	Graham Jones	584	30.2	−1.1
Green	Sheila Cameron	495	25.6	+5.0
Labour	Michele Paule	200	10.3	−3.7
Turnout		1942	41.91	
Liberal Democrats hold		Swing		

== Party share of vote map ==
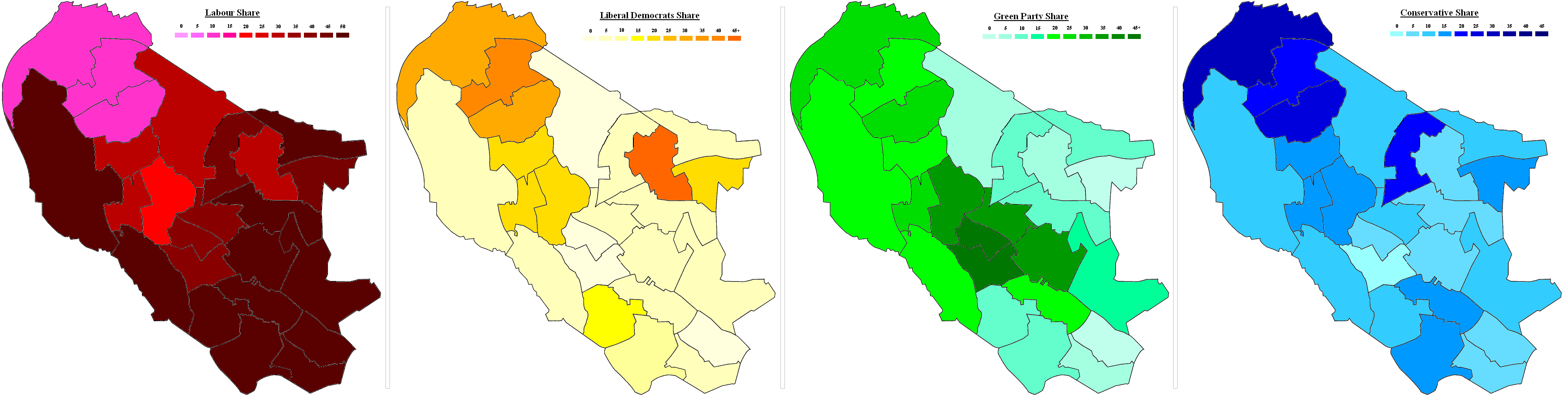

== See also ==
- Elections in the United Kingdom
