= Woodstock Road Baptist Church =

Baptist Church in Oxford, England

Coordinates: 51.774°N 1.267°W

Woodstock Road Baptist Church, located in Summertown, Oxford, UK is an evangelical church and is a member of the Fellowship of Independent Evangelical Churches.

== History ==
The church was opened in 1897 as a church for those of the baptist persuasion of the protestant Christian religion following a period of time when a group of people met for open air worship under the leadership of Rev J. H. Moore. The church was built on a plot of land on the Woodstock Road adjacent to the bottom of the newly occupied residential area of Summertown in Oxford. The original church building (known as Victoria Hall, in commemoration of the Diamond Jubilee of Queen Victoria), is of white brick with stone facings and capable of holding 100 people. The west wall of the church building was made of wood, with the intention being to expand the building westwards when numbers of attendance required it.

The church was extended in the 1930s by the addition of a brick walled, tin roofed 'hut' which as later roofed over to make a more permanent structure. The church can seat approx. 200 people. It was a member of the Baptist Union until the 1980s. The trust deeds of the church were redrawn in the late 1990s by the then pastor Keith Stokes and the church elders. This allowed the church to separate from the Baptist Union due to differences in doctrine. Woodstock Road Baptist Church (also known as WRBC or Woody Road to its members) is a Bible believing and preaching church.

The church closed for renovations from September 2012 to December 2012 and then again from September 2013 to April 2014. The church reopened on April 2, 2014.

== Church Ministries ==
Church services take place every Sunday. The main morning gathering is at 10:30am and this is streamed online at Church Services. Normally, there is a whole church lunch followed by a second, smaller, more informal gathering at 1:30pm.

Homegroups meet around and beyond the city on Tuesdays, Wednesdays and Thursdays most weeks of the year. The first week of the month, the church gathers on a Thursday evening to pray together.

== Doctrine ==
The beliefs of the church can be found on the church web site at Doctrine and Beliefs
