= St Bartholomew's Chapel, Oxford =

St Bartholomew's Chapel
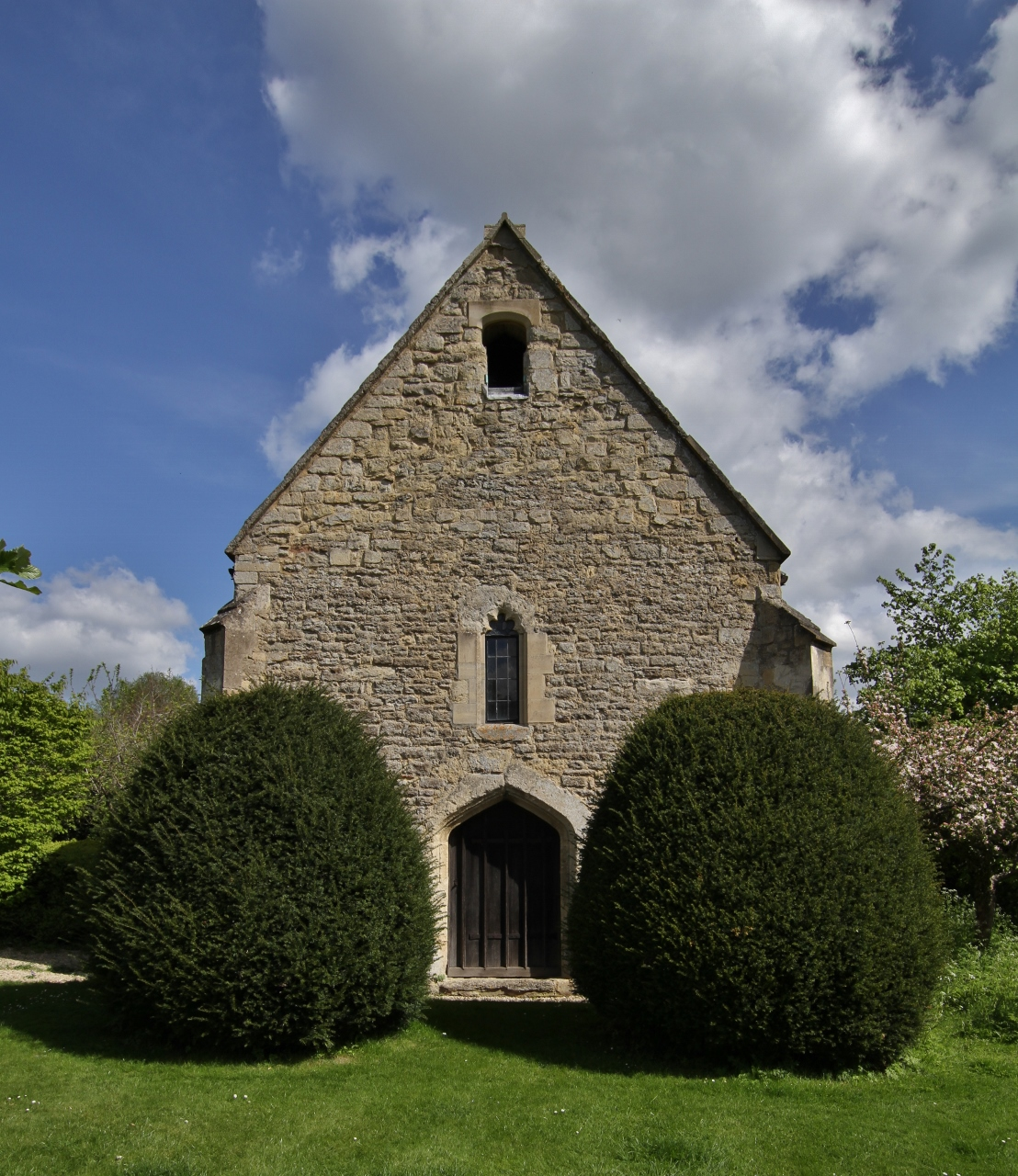
- West front of the chapel
- St Bartholomew's Chapel
- 51°44′43″N 1°13′36.66″W
- OS grid reference: SP 53475 05471
- Location: Oxford
- Country: England
- Denomination: Church of England

History
- Status: Chapel
- Founded: 12th century, restored 1329; 697 years ago
- Founder: Henry I
- Dedication: Bartholomew the Apostle

Architecture
- Heritage designation: Grade I
- Designated: 12 January 1954

Administration
- Province: Canterbury
- Diocese: Oxford

Clergy
- Rector: Oriel College

St Bartholomew's Chapel, or Bartlemas Chapel, is a small, early-14th-century chapel, built as part of a leper hospital in Oxford, England. Founded in the early 12th century by Henry I, for twelve sick persons and a chaplain, it was granted to Oriel College by Edward III in 1328. During the English Civil War, the chapel and the main range of the hospital were damaged.

A Book of Common Prayer evensong is held on the last Sunday of each month, except in December.

== History ==
Henry I endowed his foundation with £23 0s. 5d. a year, with an allowance of 5s. a year for clothing and two loads of hay every year from the king's mead near Osney. The hospital is first recorded in 1129 on the Pipe Roll, King Stephen confirmed the thirteen 'prebends' as did Henry II. The Pipe Roll of 1162 records that 60s. was spent on the building 'of the infirm of Oxford'. In 1194 Pope Celestine III confirmed the original liberties and rents, and in 1238 an immunity from paying tithes of garden produce, copse-wood, and the increase of their animals was conferred on them by Pope Gregory IX. In the 13th century the Hundred Rolls records various small gifts to hospital, and a rent roll from around 1330 gives £7 as the income from land, not including the brethren's farm of a few acres around the hospital.

During the 1310s, successive wardens mismanaged, or were accused of mismanaging, the hospital — Adam de Weston, a clerk of Edward II, was appointed warden in April, 1312, accused in July; the inquest, held in August, heard that he had sold farm produce without the brethren's consent and had kept the money, that he had dismissed the chaplain and mass was rarely said, he had dismissed servants who farmed the lands of the hospital, had a mistress and had turned a previous warden of 43 years' service, Brother William de Westbury, out of the house he had built for his own retirement. De Weston was deprived of his post and Peter de Luffenham appointed in 1315; the brethren complained that de Luffenham took more of the hospital's income than he should, that he neglected the sick and was concerned more in his own interests than theirs.

In 1316 Edward II reduced the number of brethren from twelve to eight, and stipulated that only the infirm were to be admitted until two healthy brethren remained to work on the farm, the brethren and the chaplain's clerk, were to receive 9d. a week, the master, who was also to be the chaplain, £4 a year. In 1321, the King overlooked his own rules and gave permission to admit John, son of Lawrence Serche, as a brother; John was not infirm, but promised to contribute ten marks to the repair of the chapel roof. In 1325 the brethren complained that Robert de Sutton, appointed master in 1317, had allowed the hospital to fall into disrepair, a survey was ordered and in 1326 the wardenship was granted for life to the Provost of Oriel College, Adam de Brome.

In 1328 Edward III made new arrangements for the hospital. He granted the hospital to Oriel College, the brethren were to be paid as before and there was to be a chaplain as well as a warden, any surplus after paying for those was to go to Oriel and the hospital was also to provide a place for sick members of the college to recuperate. In 1367 the college complained to the king that the brethren were disobedient and asked for a commission to look into its affairs, the King gave the hospital further regulations that admission was denied those who were married, in debt or not free, and when admitted, brethren were to contribute all their movable goods, which remained with the hospital even if they were expelled and that they might not make wills. The brethren were also charged to live chastely, to not leave the hospital without their habit and not invite their friends to the hospital without the permission of the Provost.

In 1390 the warden of the hospital of St. Lawrence without Bristol, William Coterell, was granted St Bartholomew's and Oriel petitioned against the grant as contradicting the 1328 ordinance. The verdict of the inquiry was in favour of the college.

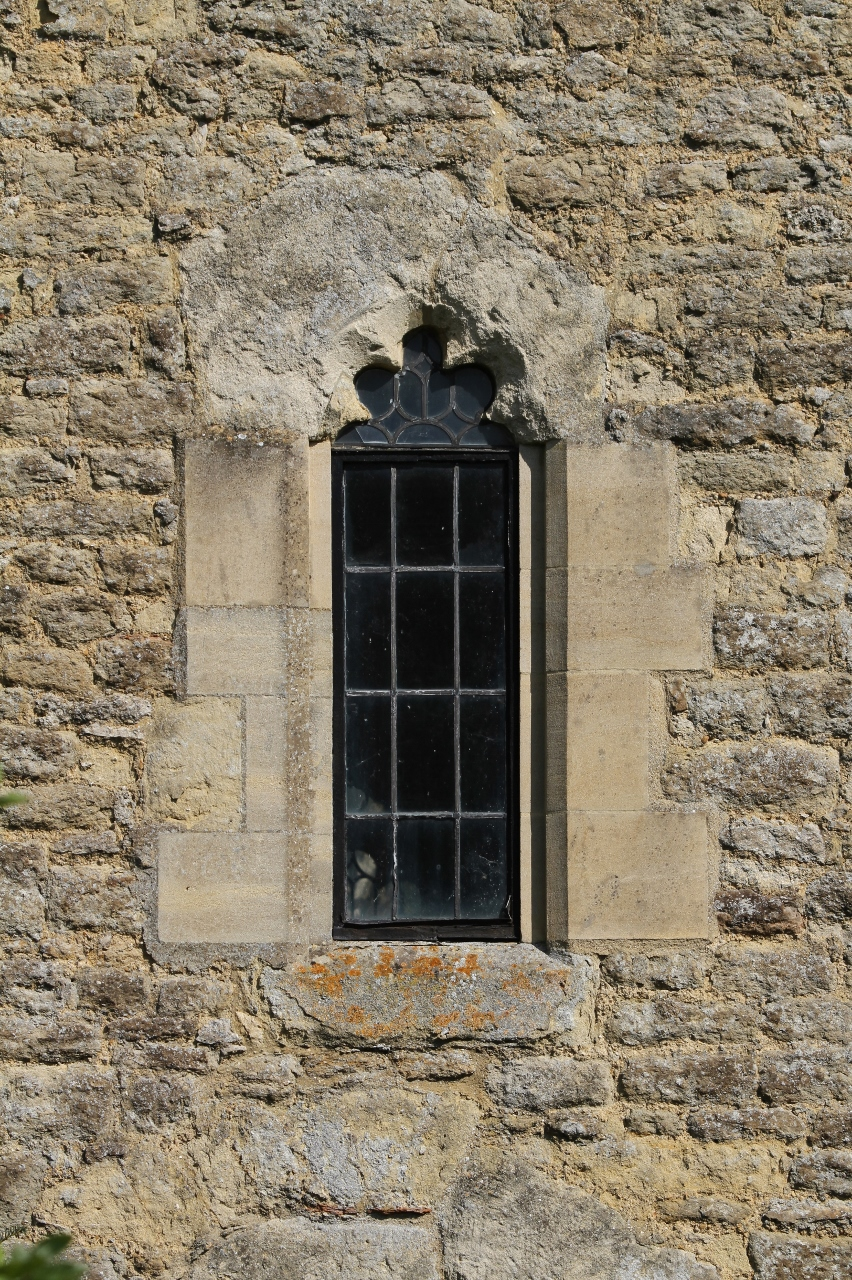
Cinquefoil window above the west door

== Building ==
The chapel has the nave and chancel in one, the north doorway, with a chamfered arch, is original. Alterations were made to the west doorway and the roof in the 15th century, in a Perpendicular Gothic style, with a crenellated wall plate and blank shields. The unusual tracery in the large two-light windows, originally dating from the 14th century, may have been added in the 17th century. One of the west windows is 17th century and repairs to the hospital are recorded in 1600, 1635 and 1649, the last for damage to the main hospital range, north of the chapel, during the English Civil War. There are remains of two painted crosses on the west wall. The simple screen with openings divided by two columns and two pendants is dated 1651 and was given by Oriel College and the plain wooden fittings are designed by Ninian Comper. It is a Grade I listed building.

== Myth and custom ==
The chapel's relics include the comb of Edward the Confessor, a cure for headaches; a piece of skin of St Bartholomew himself; and bones of St Andrew and St Philip.

It became a custom on May Day and Ascension Day for the scholars and choir of New College to walk in procession to the chapel to say prayers and sing hymns, and around a nearby well, after a recitation of the Epistle and other religious observances, they could enjoy "mere woodland merriment of a semi-pagan kind" before returning to college. On Thursday 21 May 2009, the custom was observed for the first time in 400 years by the choristers of New College. A special ceremony at Bartlemas Chapel was performed and afterwards they went to Oriel College's playing field and sang madrigals around the site of the ancient spring.
