= Lye Valley =

Protected area in Oxford, England

Coordinates: 51.748°N 1.208°W

- Site of Special Scientific Interest
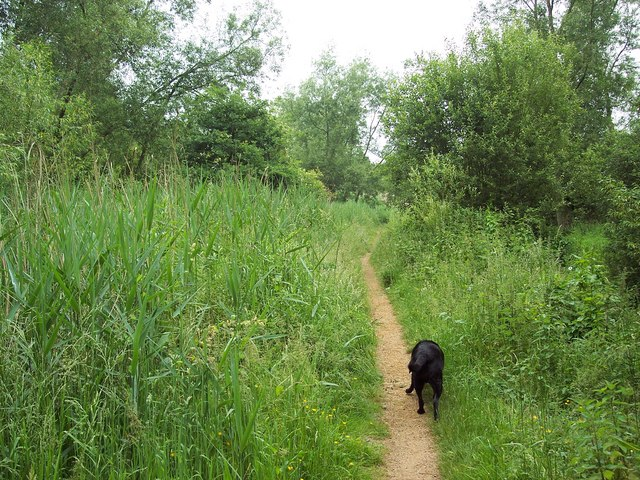
- Location of Lye Valley.
- Area of search: Oxfordshire
- Grid reference: SP 547 056
- Interest: Biological
- Area: 2.3 hectares (5.7 acres)
- Notification date: 1987
- Location map: Magic Map

Lye Valley is a 2.3-hectare (5.7-acre) biological Site of Special Scientific Interest in Headington, a suburb of Oxford in Oxfordshire. It is part of the 4.5-hectare (11-acre) Lye Valley Local Nature Reserve, which is owned and managed by Oxford City Council.

The site contains a range of habitats including spring-fed lowland fen, dominated by rushes and sedges, a variety of ponds, and wet woodland with small representations of lowland calcareous grassland, wood pasture and parkland. Lye Valley has one of the best examples in the country of a calcareous valley fen, a nationally rare habitat. The plant and animal species of the Lye Valley fen are thought to have lived there since they colonised the spring areas after the retreat of the last ice age between eight and ten thousand years ago.

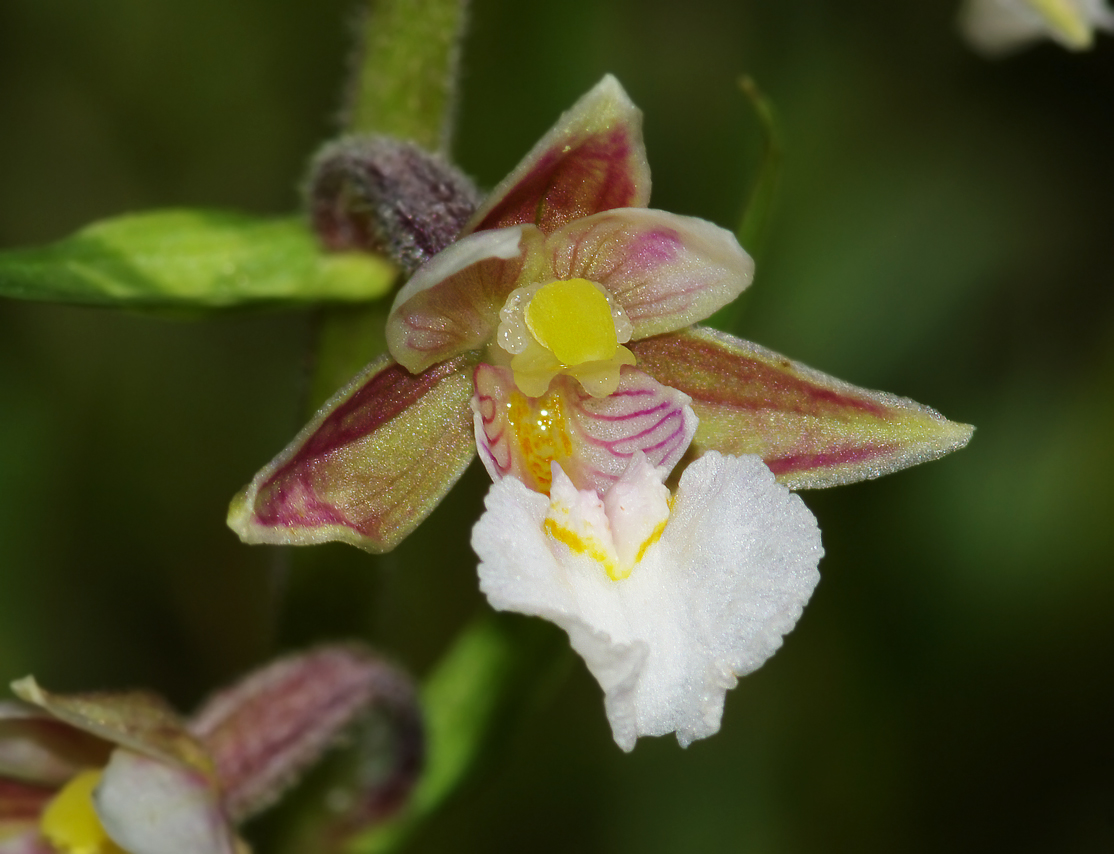
The internationally threatened marsh helleborine orchid is one of over 300 plant species that have been recorded at Lye Valley

The site has been studied by botanists since the 17th century and attracted particular interest in the Victorian era. More than 300 species of vascular plants have been recorded in the area, though some of them have not been found in recent years. Rare plants include grass-of-Parnassus and marsh helleborine orchid, which are on the Red List of Threatened Species compiled by the International Union for the Conservation of Nature (IUCN).

Bird species found in the valley include reed warbler, reed bunting, water rail and snipe.
