= Barton, Oxfordshire =

Suburb of Oxford, England

Coordinates: 51.768°N 1.196°W

Barton
- Housing estate
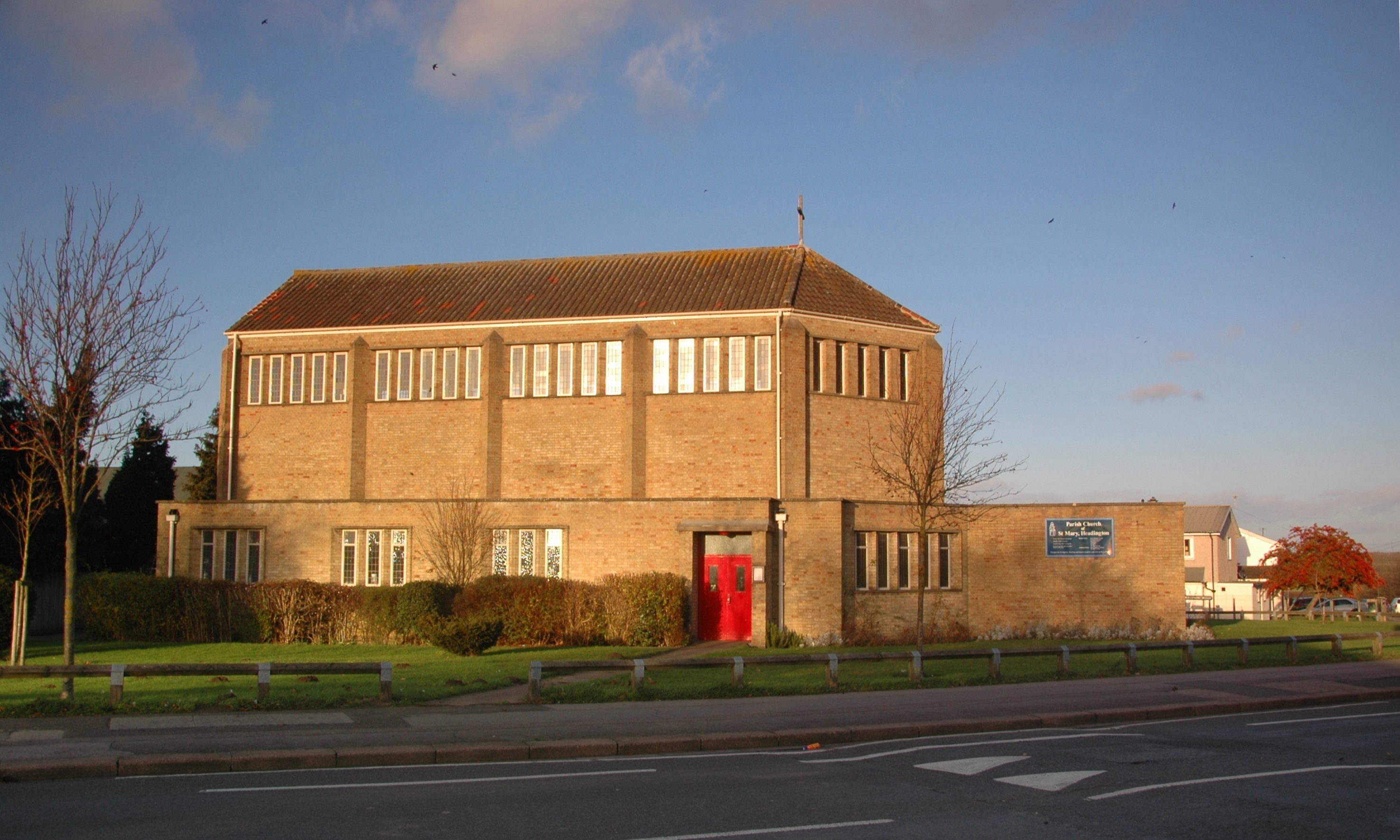
- St Mary's parish church in Bayswater Road

- Location within Oxfordshire
- Population: 7,300 (2021 Census)
- OS grid reference: SP555078
- Civil parish: Beckley and Stowood (Wick Farm only); Risinghurst and Sandhills (Sandhills only); Otherwise unparished
- District: Oxford; South Oxfordshire
- Shire county: Oxfordshire
- Region: South East
- Country: England
- Sovereign state: United Kingdom
- Post town: Oxford
- Postcode district: OX3
- Dialling code: 01865
- Police: Thames Valley
- Fire: Oxfordshire
- Ambulance: South Central
- UK Parliament: Oxford East; Henley and Thame

Barton (/ˈbɑː(ɹ)tən/) is a village and suburb of Oxford, in Oxfordshire, England. It is 3 miles east of the centre of Oxford, just outside the Oxford Ring Road. It is near to Headington, Risinghurst and Marston. Though it is now distinct, Barton was historically considered part of the Headington parish.

Oxford City Council built the Barton housing estate because of a housing shortage in the 1930s. 35.4% of the existing houses in Barton and 354 of 865 houses being built west of Barton are socially rented.

While Barton may refer to the housing estate alone, it is often used collectively to refer to the housing estate and surrounding settlements north of the ring road. These include Barton Park to the west and Sandhills to the east, which are also part of the Barton and Sandhills electoral ward. Outside of the Oxford City boundary and the Barton and Sandhills ward, but contiguous with the Barton area, Wick Farm is to the northwest and Bayswater Farm Mobile Home Park is to the east, and both may also sometimes be included when referring to Barton.

Barton is served by the East Oxford Royal Mail delivery office. While Barton is not a part of Headington, some of its postal addresses include Headington as a locality. In some cases, this is because of the historical inclusion of the Barton hamlet in the Headington area.

== History ==
=== Early history ===
The course of a Roman road between Dorchester-on-Thames and Alchester passes through Barton. There was a Roman villa northwest of Barton in the 3rd and 4th centuries. In the 1940s, sixteen Roman coins were found near Barton and in 1953 three Romano-British pots were recovered from Bayswater Brook.

Barton is Old English for barley farm. In 1246, it was known as Aldebarton, Oldebarton in 1276 and by 1326 Oldbarton. Wick Farm translates from Old English to ‘dairy farm’. In 1298 the Bayswater Brook was named Edenebroke and Hedena's Brook. (Note: Named after nearby Headington, which was originally known as Hedena's Dun)

Wick Farm has existed since at least the 13th century and is now home to various listed buildings. On Bayswater Road is Bayswater Mill, an 18th century limestone watermill and windmill, which has been converted into a house. Barton Manor is a 17th century listed building built of ashlar-faced Cotswold stone. a former pub between the 1860s and the 1980s.

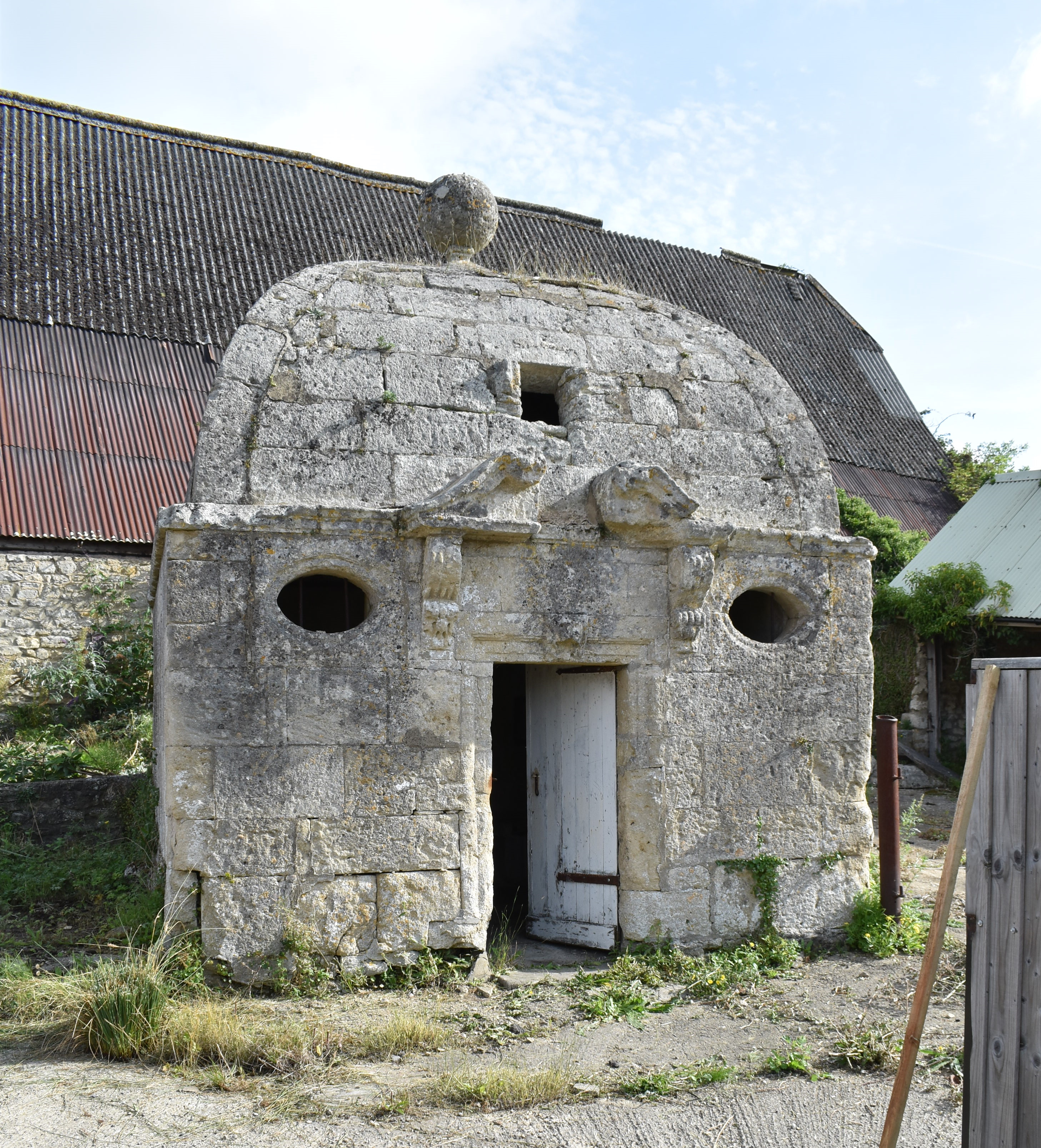
Wick Farm Well House, one of the listed buildings at the farm

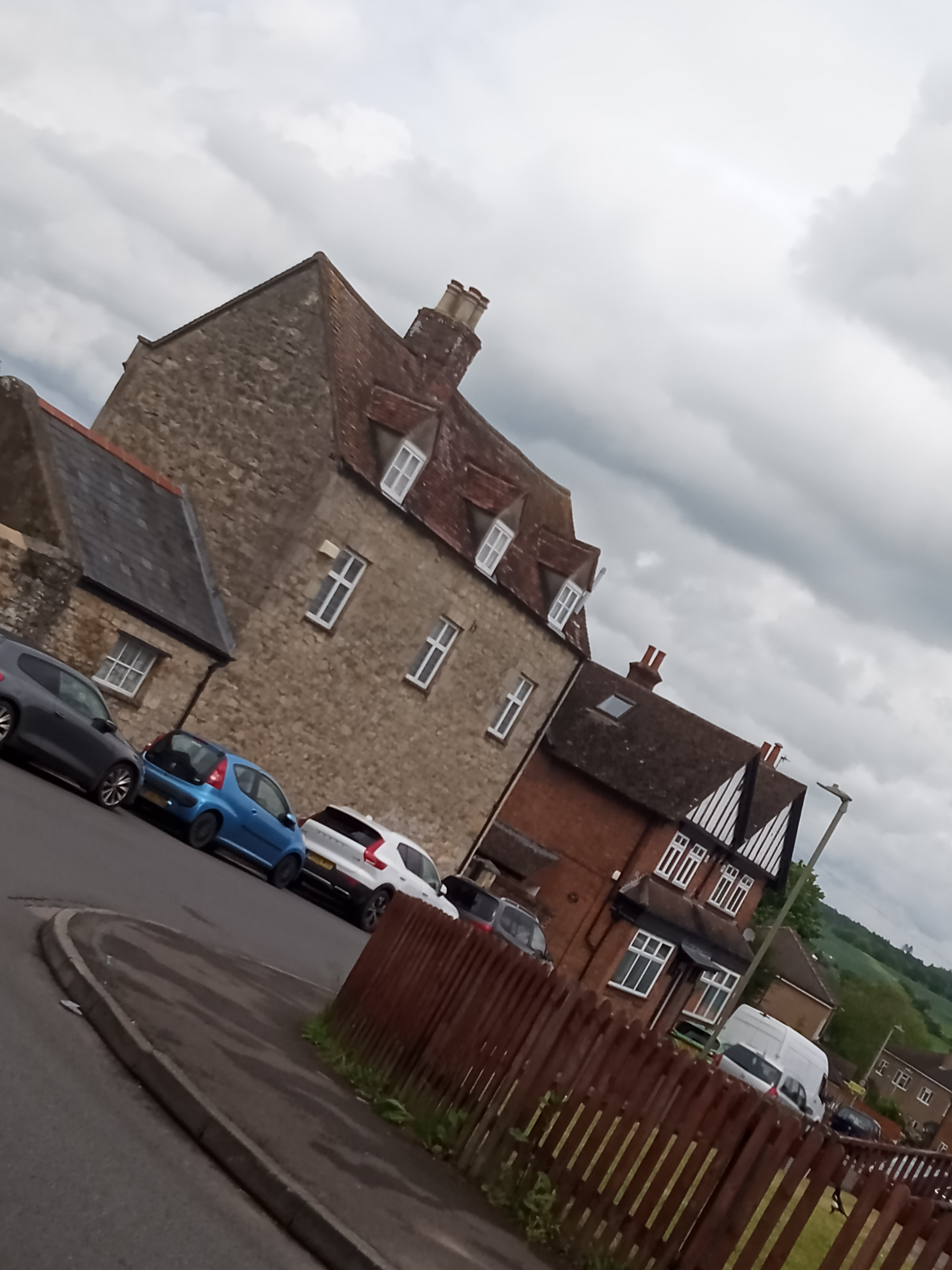
Barton Manor (left) and Prince's Castle Court (right)

Oxford Crematorium, north of Barton, was opened in 1939 by the Oxford Crematorium Company. It is where William Morris was cremated. St. Mary's Church was built in 1958 and replaced St. Andrew's Church in Headington as the local parish church.

=== Development ===
Before the Barton housing estate was built, Oxford's first council homes were built on London Road - land formerly owned by Magdalen College - by Headington Rural District Council from 1919 to 1920. Around 1925 more houses were built by Headington Urban District Council on Barton Road, which led into the hamlet of Barton and were the first houses built as part of the Barton housing estate despite not generally being considered part of Barton today.

The land Barton was later built on was north-facing and on an incline, hence it was considered unsuitable for housing development. But, in the 1930s, a housing shortage - caused by rapid expansion of the motor industry in the area, particularly from Morris Motors and Pressed Steel - prompted Oxford City Council to buy the land from Magdalen College. In 1937 there were 54 council houses, in 1977 there were 1,600 and the last council houses were built in the late 1980s.

The original community centre - built in 1949 - was replaced with the Barton Neighbourhood Centre, which provides a focal point for community activities, with a café, youth club and a library. It is run by the Barton Community Association, founded in 1946.

Bayswater Brook runs west from Forest Hill and joins the River Cherwell in Cutteslowe. Since 1975, it has been the boundary between the City of Oxford and Oxford Green Belt.

=== Barton Park and Bayswater ===
Nearly 900 homes are being built at Barton Park, which are expected to be completed in 2027. Christ Church has submitted planning applications for a further estate north of the Bayswater Brook with 1,450 homes (Note: 50% of which is social and affordable rent, shared ownership and first homes) and a new primary school and nursery - stretching from Elsfield to Bayswater Road.

Barton Park Pavilion is home to Headington Amateurs F.C. and Barton United F.C. It also has a bar and playground.

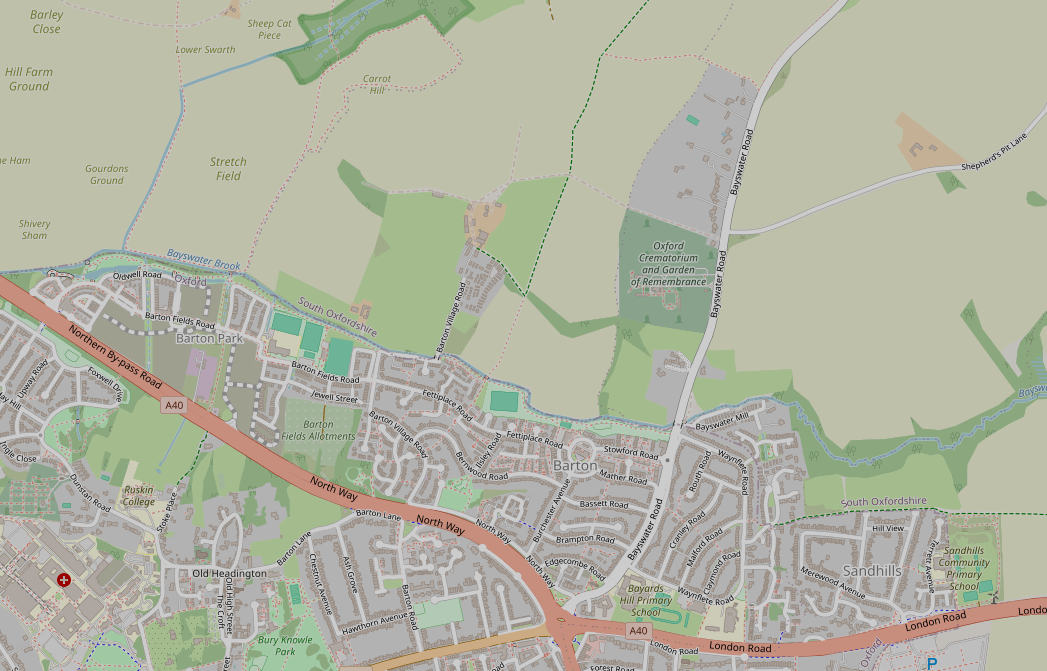
Map of Barton and Sandhills, Barton Park is to the left

== Crime rate ==
In 2021, the crime rate in Barton was 128 crimes per 1,000 people, ranking 12th out of the 86 MSOAs (Note: A set of geographical areas with unchanging boundaries and an average population of 7,200) in Oxfordshire. 8% (20.6 crimes per 1,000 people) were anti-social behaviour crimes, ranking 4th in Oxfordshire's MSOAs.

== Politics ==
Barton is in the constituency of Oxford East and ward of Barton and Sandhills except Wick Farm and Bayswater Mill which are in Henley and Thame and Forest Hill and Holton. Anneliese Dodds has been MP for Oxford East since 2017 and Freddie Van Mierlo for Henley and Thame since 2024. Mike Rowley has been a councillor for Barton and Sandhills since 2010, alongside Asima Qayyum (who replaced Jabu Nala-Hartley as a Labour candidate following her resignation from the party over Keir Starmer's comments on the Gaza war since 2024.

Barton was in the Oxford City Council ward of Headington until 2002 when it, Sandhills and the London Road estate became part of a new ward. Risinghurst & Sandhills Parish Council objected to this, arguing that the parish 'should be contained fully within one city ward'. The Local Government Commission for England responded saying:

We acknowledge that there is an historical link between Risinghurst and Sandhills. However, given that we are adopting a city-wide scheme of 24 two-member wards, we are unable to adopt the alternative suggestion of a three-member ward containing the whole of Risinghurst & Sandhills parish

In 2021, after construction had begun on Barton Park, the London Road estate was removed from the Barton and Sandhills ward.

Barton and Sandhills
Party	Candidate	Votes	%	±%
Labour	Mike Rowley *	603	52.8	13.9 ▲
Independent	Chaka Artwell	220	19.3	2.9 ▲
Conservative	Jack Matthews	178	15.6	0.3 ▲
Liberal Democrats	Paul Rogers	122	10.7	0.5 ▲
TUSC	Callum Joyce	19	1.7	New
Turnout		1142	26.76	
Labour hold				

Barton and Sandhills
Party	Candidate	Votes	%	±%
Labour	Asima Qayyum	454	35.9	–16.9
IOA	Chaka Artwell	402	31.8	+12.5
Independent	Jabu Nala-Hartley	173	13.7	N/A
Conservative	Eric Sukumaran	119	9.4	–6.2
Liberal Democrats	Paul Rogers	118	9.3	–1.4
Majority		52	4.1	
Turnout		1,266	28.2	+1.4
Labour hold		Swing	▼14.7	

== Amenities ==
Barton Leisure Centre, which includes a swimming pool and gym, is on Waynflete Road. Barton has four schools: Bayards Hill Primary School, Barton Park Primary School and Sandhills Community Primary School - both part of the River Learning Trust - and Endeavour Academy, a special needs school.

Rectory Farm was founded in 1954 and owns land around Barton. Since 1980 it has run a pick-your-own farm north of Barton, next to Stanton St. John. It has various berries in the summer, then sweetcorn and pumpkins in the autumn.

In the centre of the estate, Underhill Circus, there is a community centre, chippy, corner shop, graffiti wall, GP, and pharmacy. Elsewhere there are two small nature reserves (Cydlings Copse and Barton Village Nature Park), an allotments, Bonny Banks park (AKA Joy Meadows) and a pond.

=== Buses ===
The Oxford Bus Company and Stagecoach route 8 links Barton to Oxford via Headington. The Oxford Bus Company route X3 links Barton to Abingdon via the John Radcliffe Hospital, Red Rose Travel route 108 to Bicester via Beckley and Stagecoach route H5 to Bicester via Islip.
