= Wood Farm, Oxfordshire =

Housing estate in Oxford, England

Coordinates: 51.752°N 1.200°W

Wood Farm
- Housing estate
- Forester Tower

- Location within Oxfordshire
- Population: 3,600
- OS grid reference: SP553059
- District: Oxford
- Shire county: Oxfordshire
- Region: South East
- Country: England
- Sovereign state: United Kingdom
- Post town: Oxford
- Postcode district: OX3
- Dialling code: 01865
- Police: Thames Valley
- Fire: Oxfordshire
- Ambulance: South Central
- UK Parliament: Oxford East

Wood Farm is a suburb of Oxford, England, 3.5 miles (5.6 km) southeast of the city centre. It is mainly made up of social housing built in the 1950s to 1960s, originally to house workers of the nearby car factory. It is near to Headington, Cowley and Morrell Avenue.

== Services ==
Oxford City Council organizes street wardens in the area. Wood Farm has a community centre and primary school

The Stagecoach route 10 links Wood Farm to Headington and Oxford via Cowley. The Oxford Bus Company route 15 links Wood Farm to Oxford via Morrell Avenue.
