= Swan School =

Secondary school in Oxford, England

The Swan School

Location
- Marston Ferry Road; Oxford, Oxfordshire, OX2 7WP; England; 51°46′19″N 1°14′28″W

Information
- Type: Free school
- Established: 2019; 7 years ago
- Local authority: Oxfordshire
- Department for Education URN: 147203 Tables
- Ofsted: Reports
- Chair of Governors: Sally Addis
- Headteacher: Kay Wood
- Gender: Coeducational
- Age: 11 to 18
- Enrolment: 667
- Website: theswanschool.org.uk

The Swan School is a coeducational secondary school and sixth form located in Marston, Oxford. The school opened in September 2019 and was Oxford's first new secondary school in more than 50 years.

== History ==
The Swan is part of the River Learning Trust which also includes nearby Cherwell School. The school has a capacity of 1,260 pupils. Admissions first started with an intake of 120 students in September 2019, into temporary accommodation. New premises were constructed on Marston Ferry Road and the school moved in September 2020. As of January 2024 the school has a teaching complement of 46.

Pupils at the Swan are banned from bringing in pack lunches (unless a student is medically exempt from this), with all served meals being vegetarian in order to realise "environmental benefits" and enable "better quality" food. In September 2022 the school was reported to have the highest exclusion rate in the county of Oxfordshire, with 11% of pupils having temporary suspensions over the preceding year. The Swan achieved an overall rating of "Good" in its first Ofsted inspection in September 2023, however it achieved "Outstanding" ratings in behaviour and attitudes, personal development, leadership and management, and sixth-form provision.
