= Ben Hope (disambiguation) =

Ben Hope is a mountain in northern Scotland.

Ben Hope may also refer to:

- Ben Hope, a character from the graphic novel Heartstopper
- Ben Hope, a series of novels by Scott Mariani

== See also ==
- Benjamin Hope (born 1976), British painter
