= Marston Ferry Road =

Road in North Oxford, England

Coordinates: 51.7754°N 1.250°W

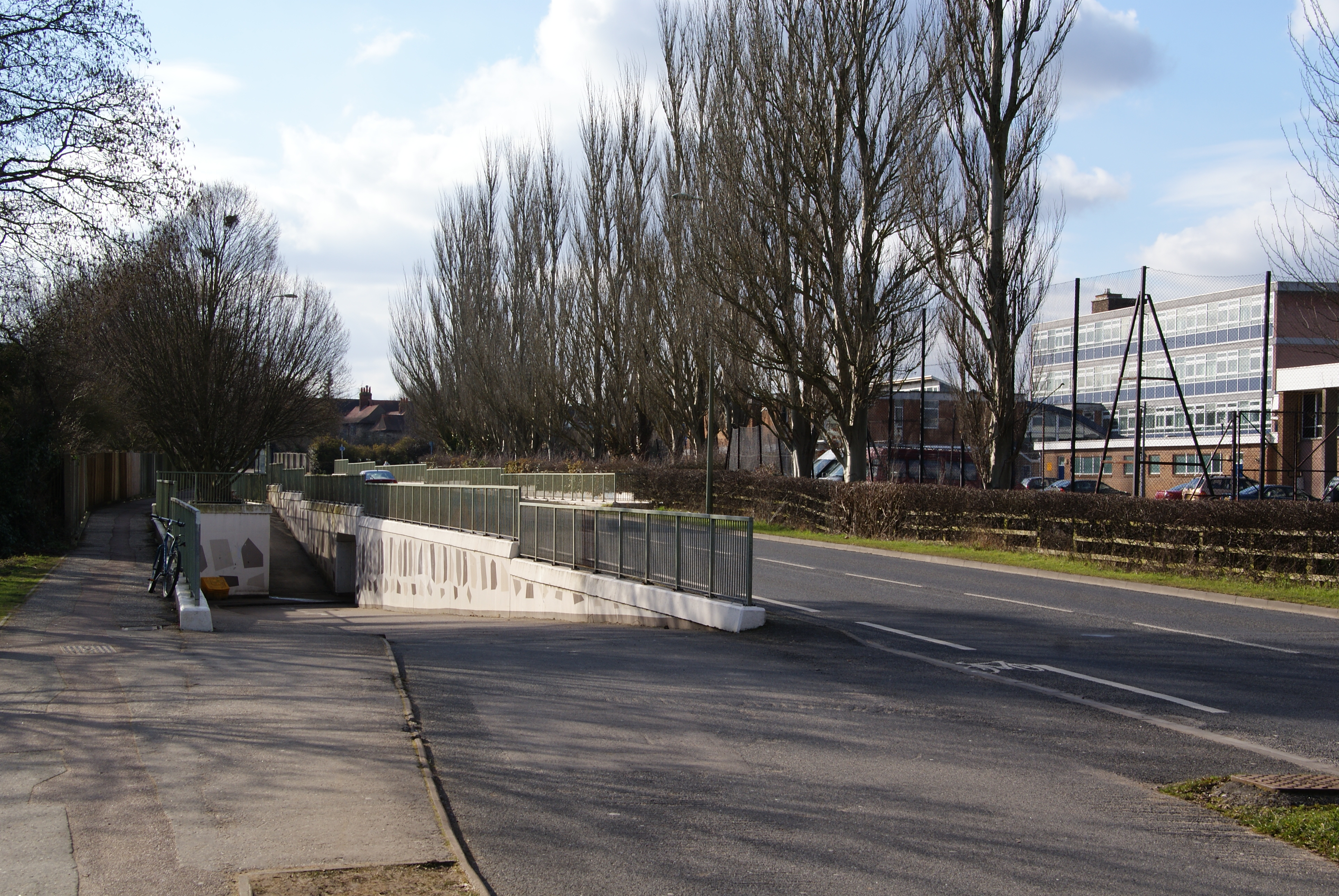
Cycle route under the Marston Ferry Road in Summertown, north Oxford.

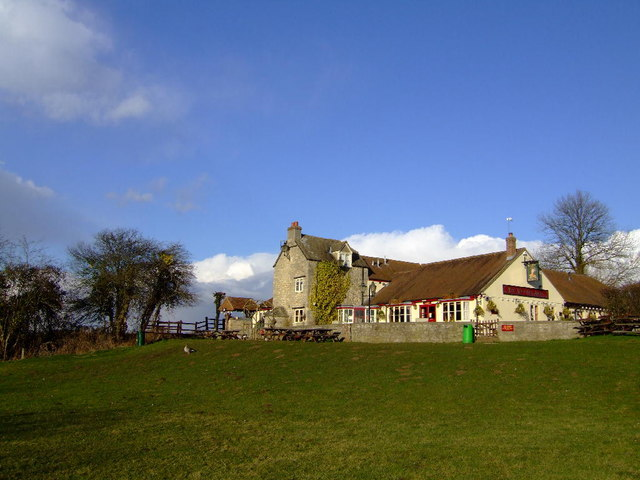
The Victoria Arms pub on the River Cherwell, just north of Marston Ferry Road.

Marston Ferry Road is a link road in north Oxford, England. It is named after the ferry that used to cross the River Cherwell at the village of Marston from at least 1279.

The road links the Banbury Road in North Oxford just south of Summertown, continuing as Moreton Road to the Woodstock Road, with Cherwell Drive in Marston, continuing as Headley Way to Headington to the southeast. It is a modern link road with a bridge over the River Cherwell about halfway along, opened on 12 November 1971.

As the name implies, there was previously a ferry over the river. This latterly consisted of a punt a little to the north that could be pulled from one bank to the other using a tow rope, and carried pedestrians and bicycles only. The link road was constructed in 1971.

At the western end is Cherwell School. Oxford High School (on Belbroughton Road) is to the south. In 2021 the Swan School, located on the eastern end of the road, was officially opened.

There are a number of sports fields and facilities in the vicinity. For example, the Oxford Cavaliers play rugby at the Oxford Harlequins Rugby Union Football Club here, and the Ferry Sports Centre run by the Oxford City Council, which includes a swimming pool, is off the road to the north.

Just to the north on the east bank of the river is the Victoria Arms (or "Vicky Arms"), a public house frequented by people out punting. It is possible to moor punts in the grounds of the pub.

The road is designated the B4495.
