= T. Lawrence Dale =

English architect (1884–1959)

Thomas Lawrence Dale
- Born: 4 March 1884; London, England
- Died: 29 March 1959 (aged 75); Oxford, England
- Occupation: Architect
- Practice: Dale and Son
- Buildings: Horn Park, Beaminster, Dorset; St. Swithun's parish church, Kennington, Oxfordshire

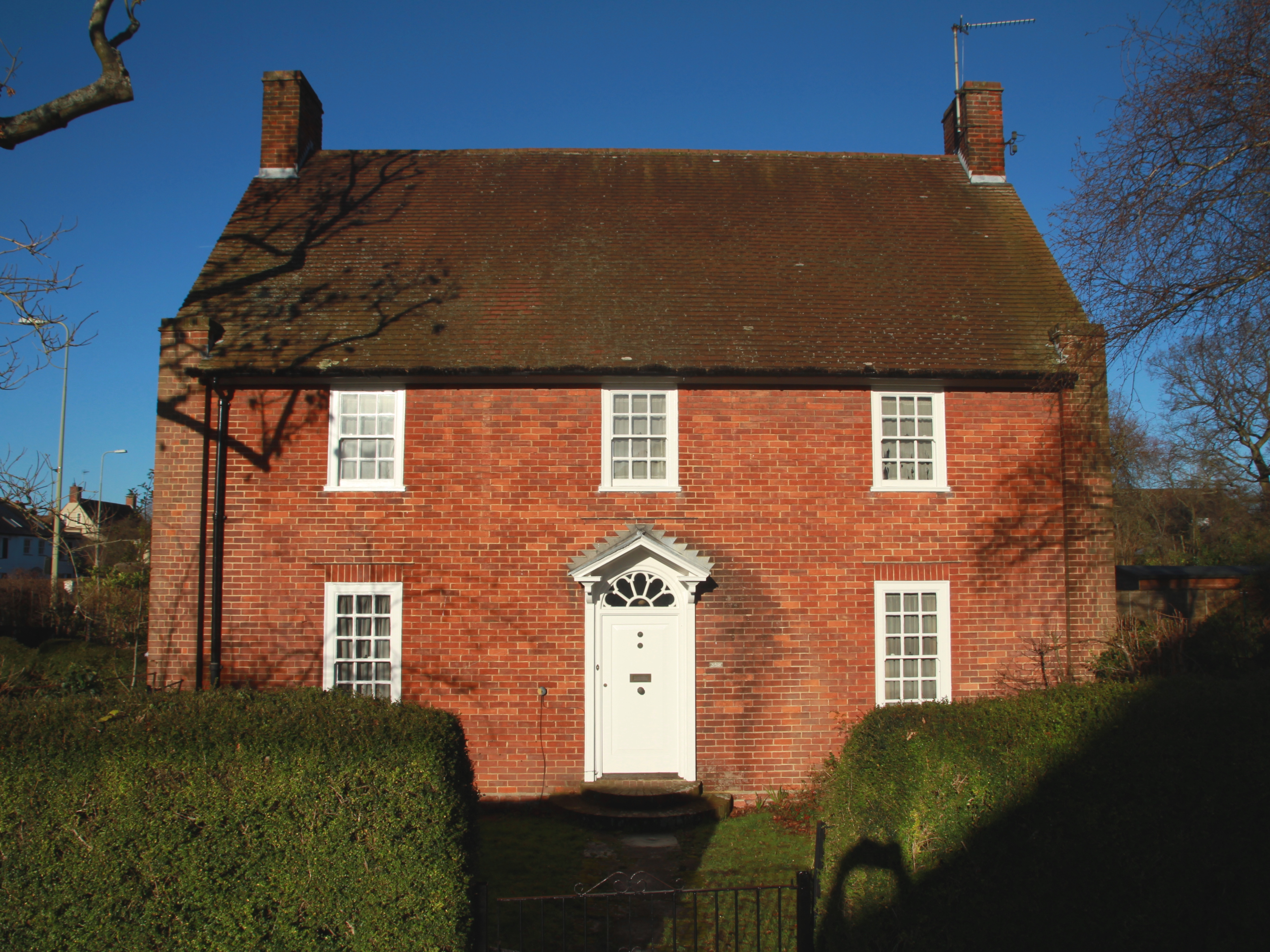
House in Woodstock Road, Oxford, that Dale designed for his own family

Thomas Lawrence Dale, FRIBA, FSA (known as T.L. Dale, T. Lawrence Dale or Lawrence Dale) was an English architect. Until the First World War he concentrated on designing houses for private clients. From the 1930s Dale was the Oxford Diocesan Surveyor and was most noted for designing, restoring, and furnishing Church of England parish churches.

== Training and career ==
Dale was born in London, where he was educated at University College School in Hampstead. He began his architectural training at the Architectural Association School of Architecture in 1900, was articled to Charles Ponting in Marlborough, Wiltshire 1901–04, and served as assistant to the architect Edmund Buckle 1904–06. Dale passed his architect's qualifying examination in 1906 and was admitted as an Associate of the Royal Institute of British Architects (ARIBA) in 1907.

Before the First World War, Dale lived in Bedford Park in west London. By the outbreak of that war he had his own practice at 40 Great James Street, off Bedford Row, London WC1. In the war he was commissioned as an officer in an infantry battalion, but when he was placed in reserve he successfully applied to transfer to the Army Cyclist Corps to see active service. He rose to the rank of Captain and was mentioned in despatches.

After the war, Dale moved to Banbury where he designed a series of council houses for Banbury Rural District Council, for which he was paid the RIBA-recommended fee of £2500. The houses were built in several villages including Wardington, Hook Norton, Drayton, Milcombe, Adderbury, Barford St Michael, Milton, and Tadmarton, and were let to returning soldiers and their families. The designs, which included Mansard roofs, were praised for their appearance, and Dale made a point of grouping houses together as much as possible "on the assumption that neighbours should also be friends."

In the 1920s Dale spent "a delightful year" working on "an exceedingly complicated planning problem" as a competitor in a worldwide architectural competition to design the new Freemasons' Grand Temple in Great Queen Street in London. Dale came second, for which he won "a large prize".

Some time thereafter he moved to Oxford, where he designed the modest neo-Georgian house that was built for him and his family at 358 Woodstock Road. He later moved again to 4 Bradmore Road on the Victorian Norham Manor estate.

Dale served as Oxford Diocesan Surveyor for 23 years. He designed at least four parish churches that were built in or near Oxford. He also designed restoration work or new furnishings for a number of parish churches; most of them in Oxfordshire, plus one in Warwickshire.

== Family ==
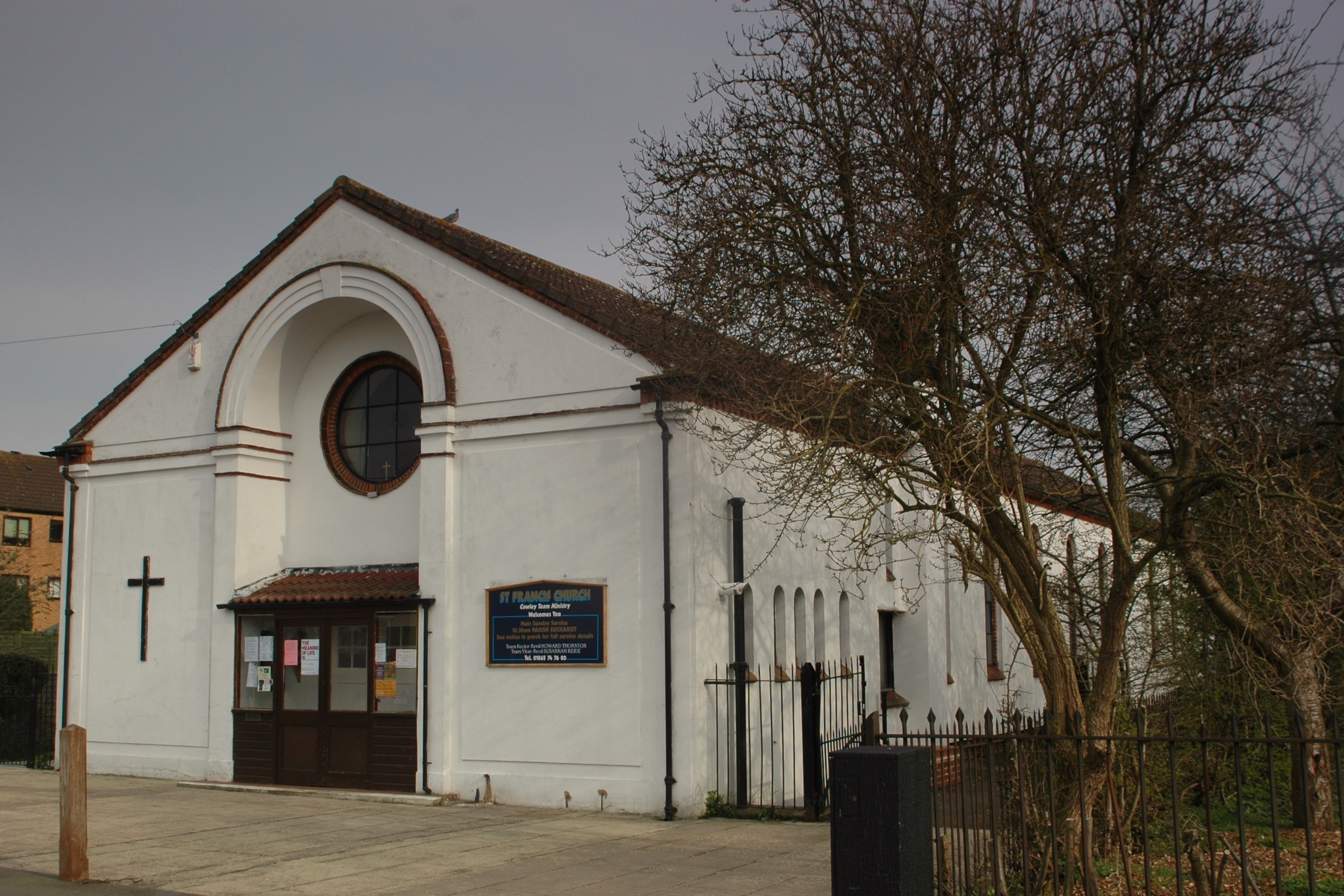
St Francis of Assisi parish church, Cowley (1931)

Dale's wife predeceased him. They left two sons and two daughters. By the time of Dale's death, both sons had married and one of the daughters was a Sister in a religious order.

Dale's death in 1959 was reported in The Times. Harry Carpenter, Bishop of Oxford, assisted at his funeral. Lawrence Dale is buried in Wolvercote Cemetery near his home in Oxford.

Dale's elder son Thomas Simon Savage Dale (known as Simon Dale) was born in 1919 and also became an architect. They practised together as Dale and Son. In 1957 Simon Dale married Susan Wilberforce, a descendant of William Wilberforce, and moved with her to Hopton Castle, Shropshire. Simon Dale later lost his sight, was divorced in 1972, and in 1987 was beaten to death at The Heath, the house that he and Susan had restored at Hopton Castle.

== Secular buildings ==
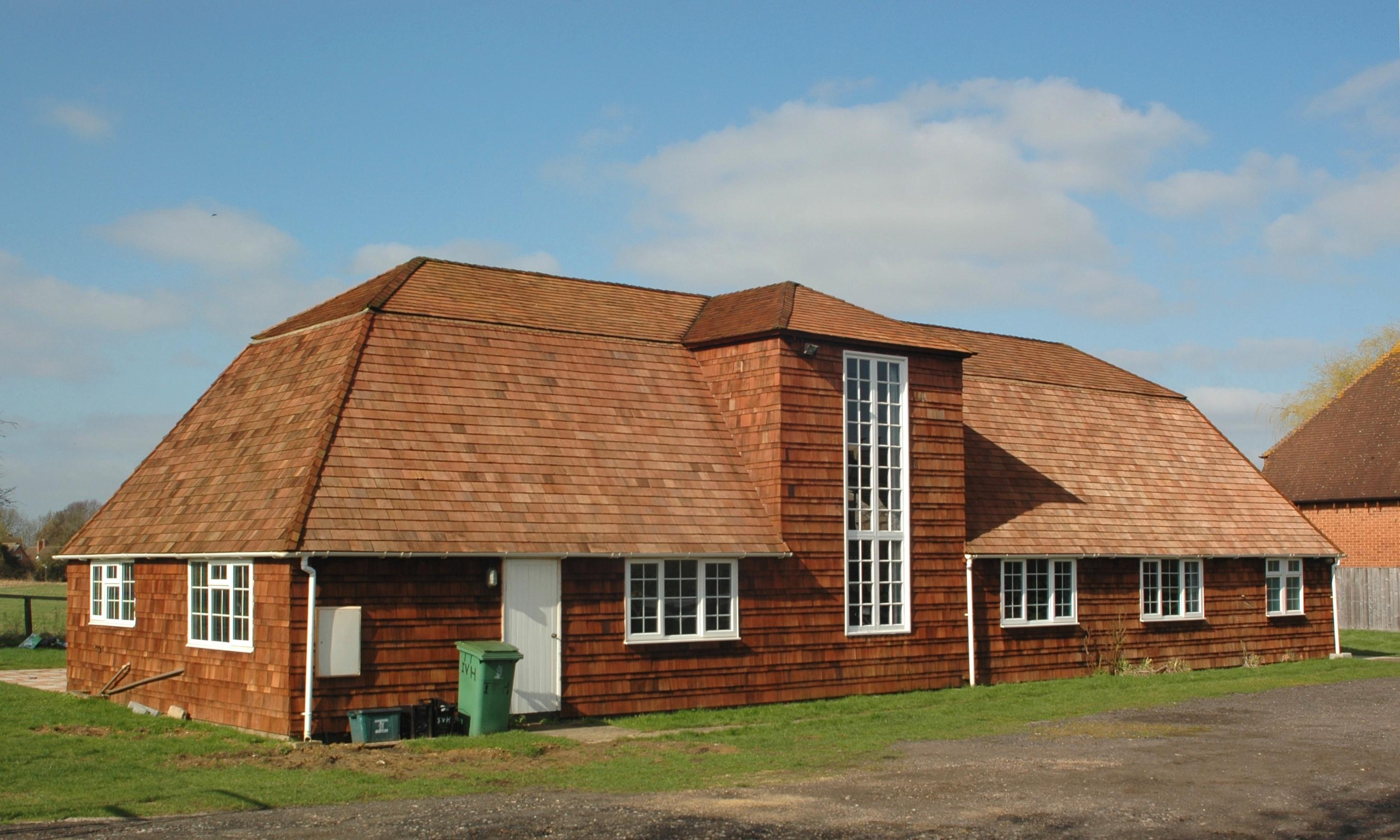
Ickford Village Hall (1946)

Two of Dale's earlier works are Edwardian houses in Hampstead Garden Suburb, one of which has been described as "an excellent house of the Lutyens school". Horn Park, a country house about 1.5 miles (2.4 km) north-west of Beaminster, Dorset, is Dale's largest and perhaps most significant house design. It is a symmetrical neo-Georgian building of five bays and two storeys, completed in 1911. Its central corridor is barrel vaulted and leads to a drawing room whose groin vault is reminiscent of the work of Sir John Soane (1753–1837). The house is Listed Grade II.

Lawrence and Simon Dale together designed Ickford Village Hall (1946). The roof and almost all of the walls are hung with wooden shingles, possibly in response to the shortage of many types of building material after the Second World War.

== Parish churches ==
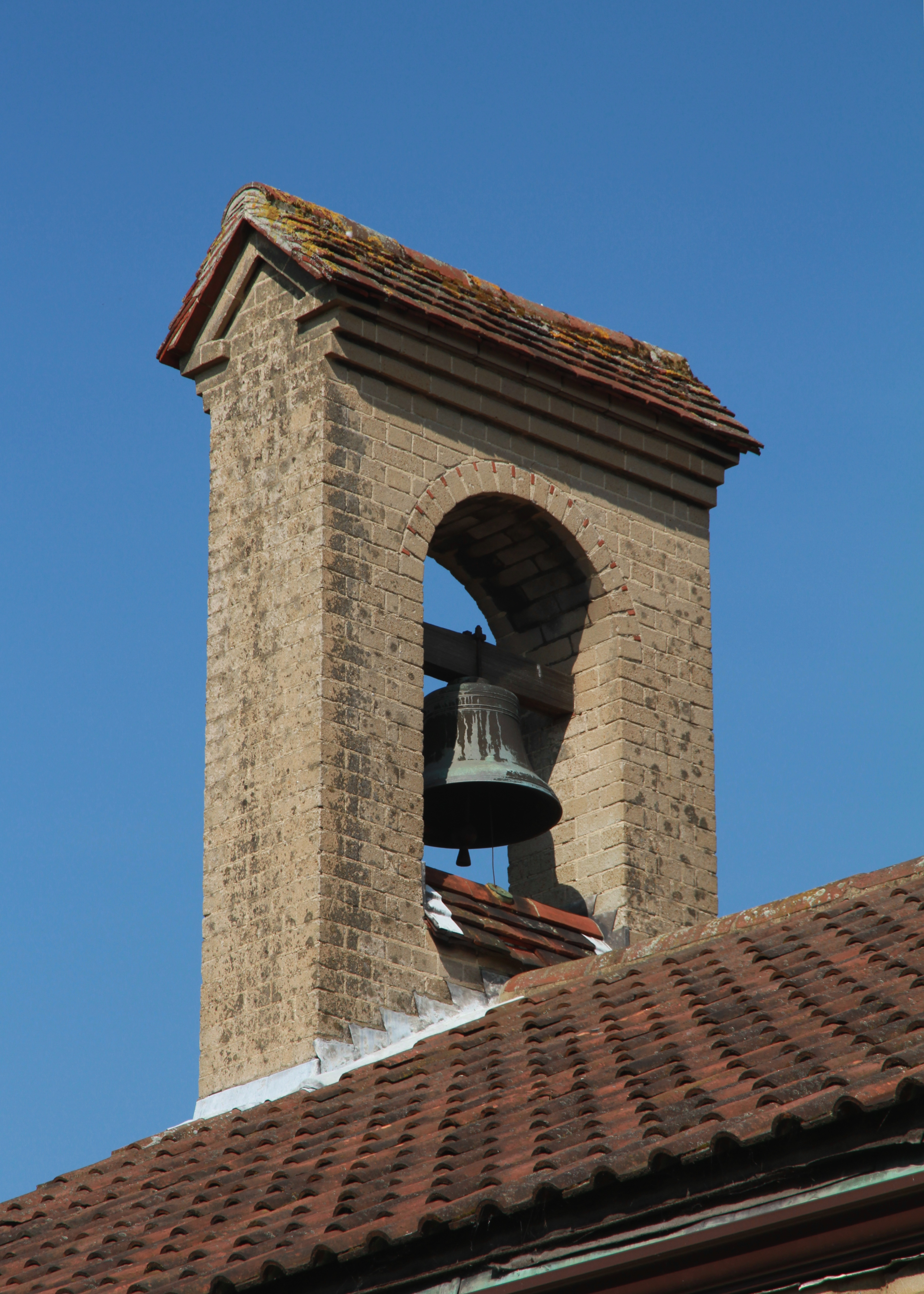
Bell-gable of St Alban the Martyr parish church, Oxford (1933)

Like Charles Ponting (1850–1932) to whom he had been articled, Dale's ecclesiastical architecture was strongly Anglo-Catholic. However, whereas Ponting continued to work in the Gothic Revival idiom long after it had passed out of fashion, Dale adopted Italianate architecture for his churches.

Dale designed at least four parish churches for the Diocese of Oxford. The first, St. Francis of Assisi, Cowley (1930–31), was built on a site provided by Morris Motors as a temporary daughter church of St. James, Cowley. It was made a permanent church and dedicated in 1962. St. Francis' is a simple building with only a small chancel. Dale's second church, St. Alban the Martyr, Oxford (1933), replaced a chapel of ease that had been built for St. Mary and St. John parish church in 1889. St. Alban's is a relatively low building for its length and is limited by a narrow corner site. He also designed "halls" – possibly mission halls – for the parishes of St. Nicholas, Marston and St. James, Cowley.

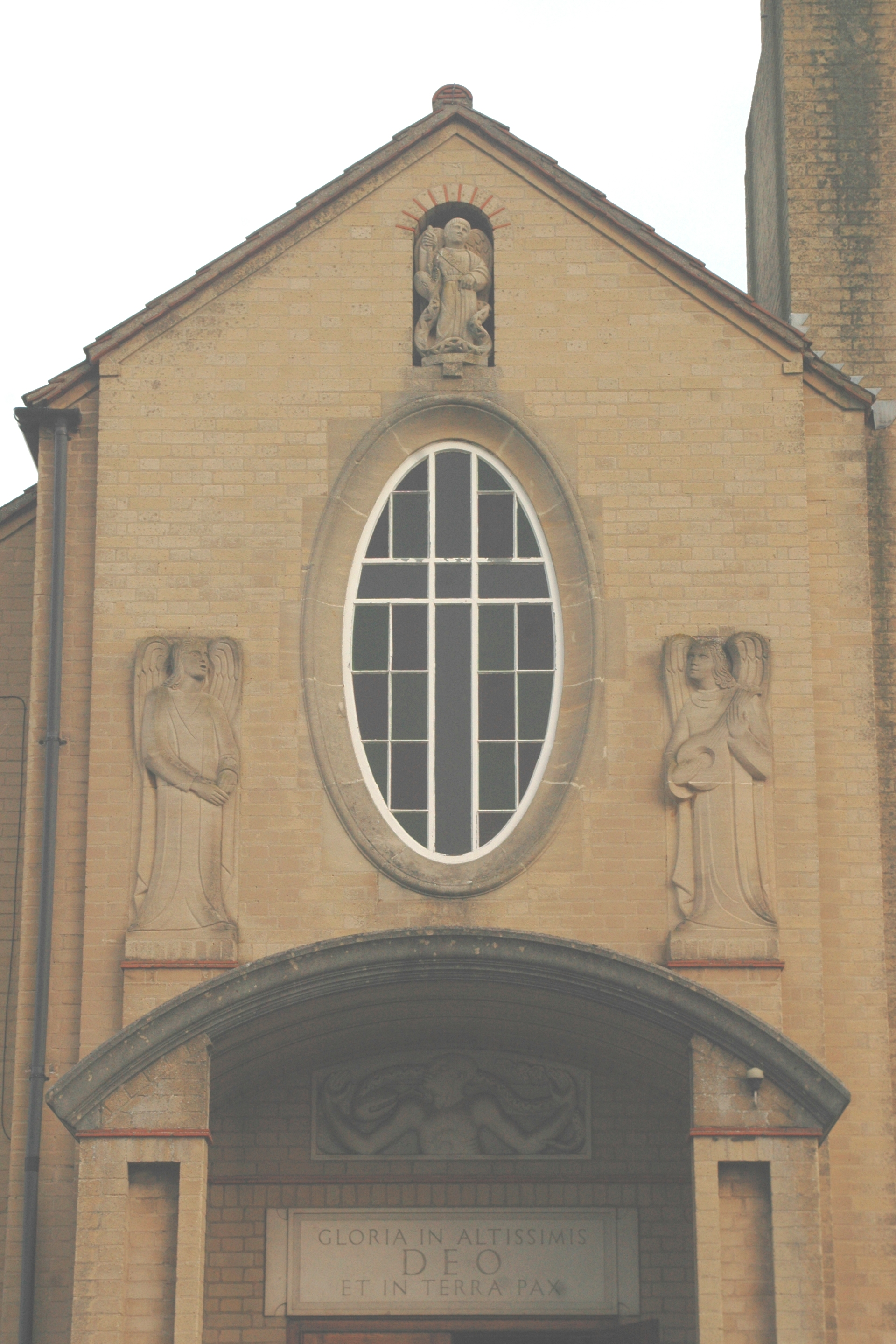
Part of west front of St Michael and All Angels parish church, New Marston (1956)

Dale's churches built after the Second World War were more ambitious. St. Michael and All Angels, New Marston (1954–56), was built as a chapel of ease for St. Andrew's parish church, Headington. It is more substantial in scale and has a statue of St. Michael by Michael Groser and a reredos painted by Leon Underwood. St. Michael's is described as being in a "vaguely Italian renaissance style" but the building is slightly limited by its corner site. Dale's final church, St. Swithun, Kennington (1956–58), is in a spacious churchyard that allowed Dale the space to use a more spacious cruciform plan.

Most of Dale's churches share common features: a tympanum with bas-reliefs over the main door, pantiled roofs, an Italianate pent-roofed chimney for the boiler and in some cases a baldachin over the main altar and a pantiled bell-cot on the west gable. With the exception of St. Francis of Assisi (which is stuccoed) they are built of a modern buff brick that contrasts with traditional building materials in this part of England. The tympanum at St. Alban the Martyr was carved by John Brookes, then Principal of Oxford City Technical College. St. Francis' has also a set of Stations of the Cross carved by Eric Gill.

== Watercolours ==
Dale was a watercolourist "of more than average ability" who was a member of local arts clubs in Oxford. He held a number of exhibitions of his work, which was compared with that of Paul Sandby.

== "Christ Church Mall" ==
Central Oxford had become acutely congested with motor traffic in the 1920s and 1930s. When Dale first moved from Banbury to Oxford he practised from an office in Carfax "but the traffic there was shocking" so he gave up his office and practised from home.

In September 1941 Dale published a six-page pamphlet called Christ Church Mall: a Diversion in which he proposed a relief road skirting the south side of Christ Church Meadow along the bank of the River Thames to link Abingdon Road and Iffley Road to bypass High Street.

In 1944 Dale expanded on his proposals into a 60-page book, Towards a Plan for Oxford City, illustrated with some of his own watercolours. In it he reiterated his "Christ Church Mall" road proposal and proposed extensive redevelopment of St. Clement's and St. Ebbes.

In 1946 the County Borough of Oxford commissioned Thomas Sharp to make proposals to relieve Oxford's traffic and re-plan parts of the city. In 1948 Sharp published his report as a book, Oxford Replanned, in which he paid tribute:

Mr. Dale has presented his case very attractively and wittily, and has done the city a considerable service in braving the controversy which was bound to result from any attempt to touch even the hem of the sacred Christ Church Meadow.

However, Sharp also thought that Dale's "Christ Church Mall" would be too indirect, particularly for traffic from Headington Hill and Marston Road. Sharp instead proposed a road across the northern side of Christ Church Meadow, which he called "Merton Mall" as it would have passed very close to Merton College.

The Times also commended Dale for "presenting his case with architectural vision, wit and eloquence" in Towards a Plan for Oxford City, and quoted Dale's vision that "a finely designed parkway" would be "A beautiful road between the Towers and the Thames severally dreaming and streaming".

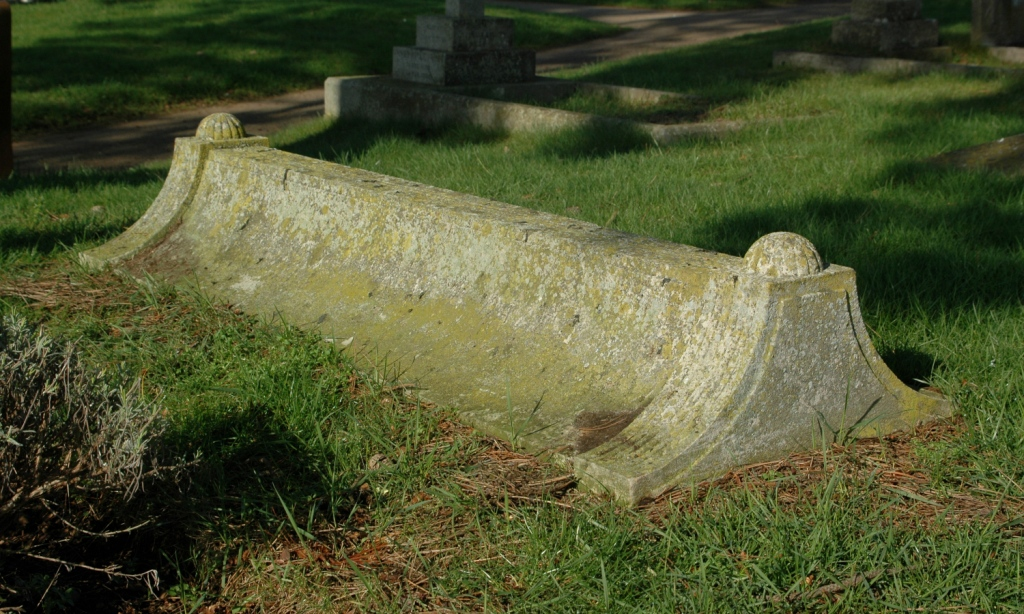
Lawrence Dale's gravestone in Wolvercote Cemetery

In 1956 the Ministry of Transport and Civil Aviation held an enquiry at which Dale continued to make his case. Dale told the enquiry:

nobody more than he admired the beauty of Christ Church Meadow, and anyone who wanted a road through it was a vandal. But, he said, there was a vast difference in having a road round the Meadow, as he was suggesting. The road could be so landscaped that it could not be seen from the river or from the north side of the meadow. The real beauty of the meadow was Merton Fields and the Broad Walk, and that would be destroyed by Dr. Sharp's plan.

Dale cited in his support Professor Sir Albert Richardson, then president of the Royal Academy, who "had said, in 1944, that Christ Church Meadow would suffer no detriment if skirted by a tree-lined road".

Sharp's proposal was the subject of more than 20 years of political and public debate and protest. Neither Sharp's nor Dale's proposed road was ever built.

== List of works ==
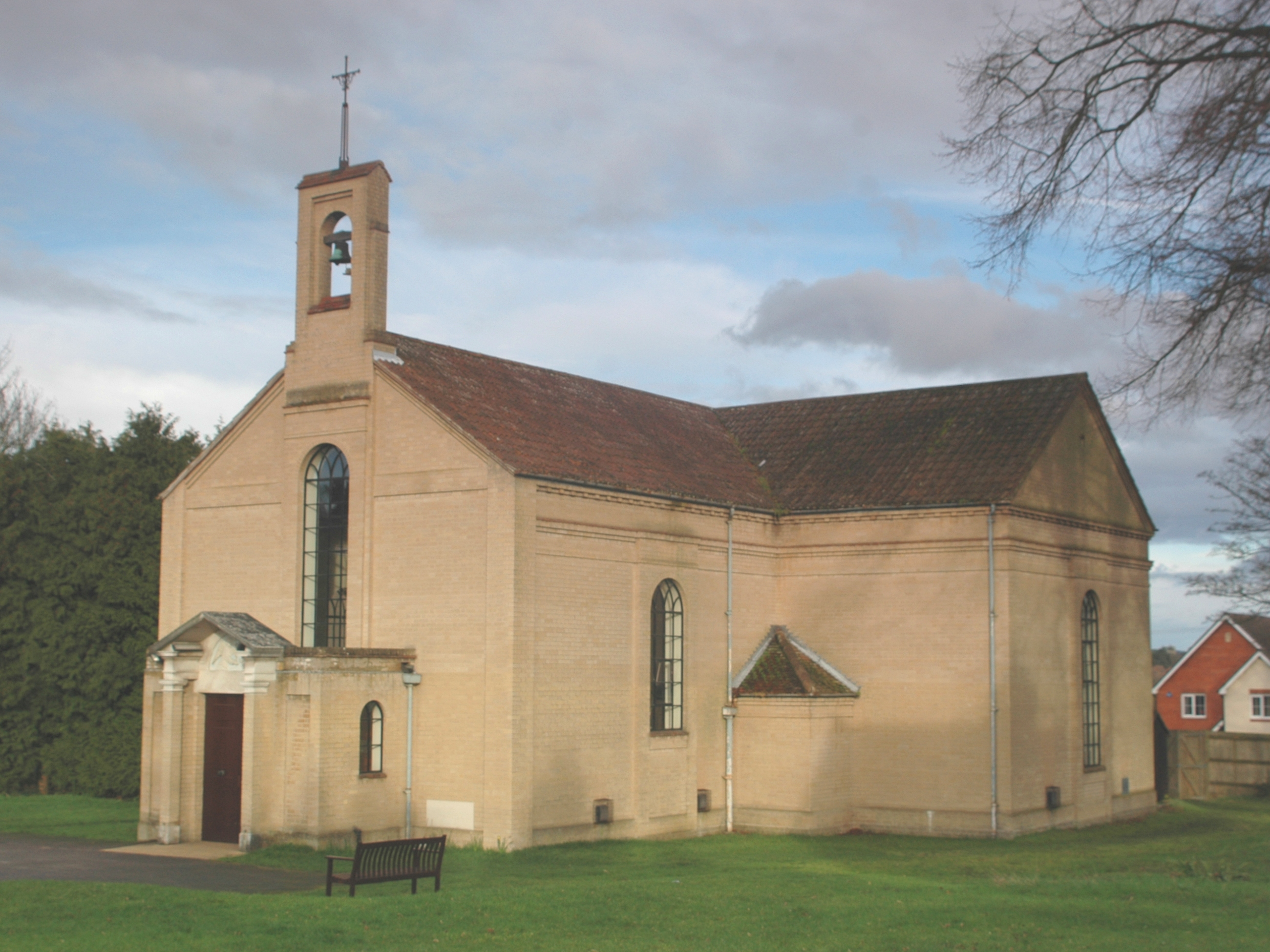
St Swithun's parish church, Kennington, Oxfordshire (formerly Berkshire) (1958)

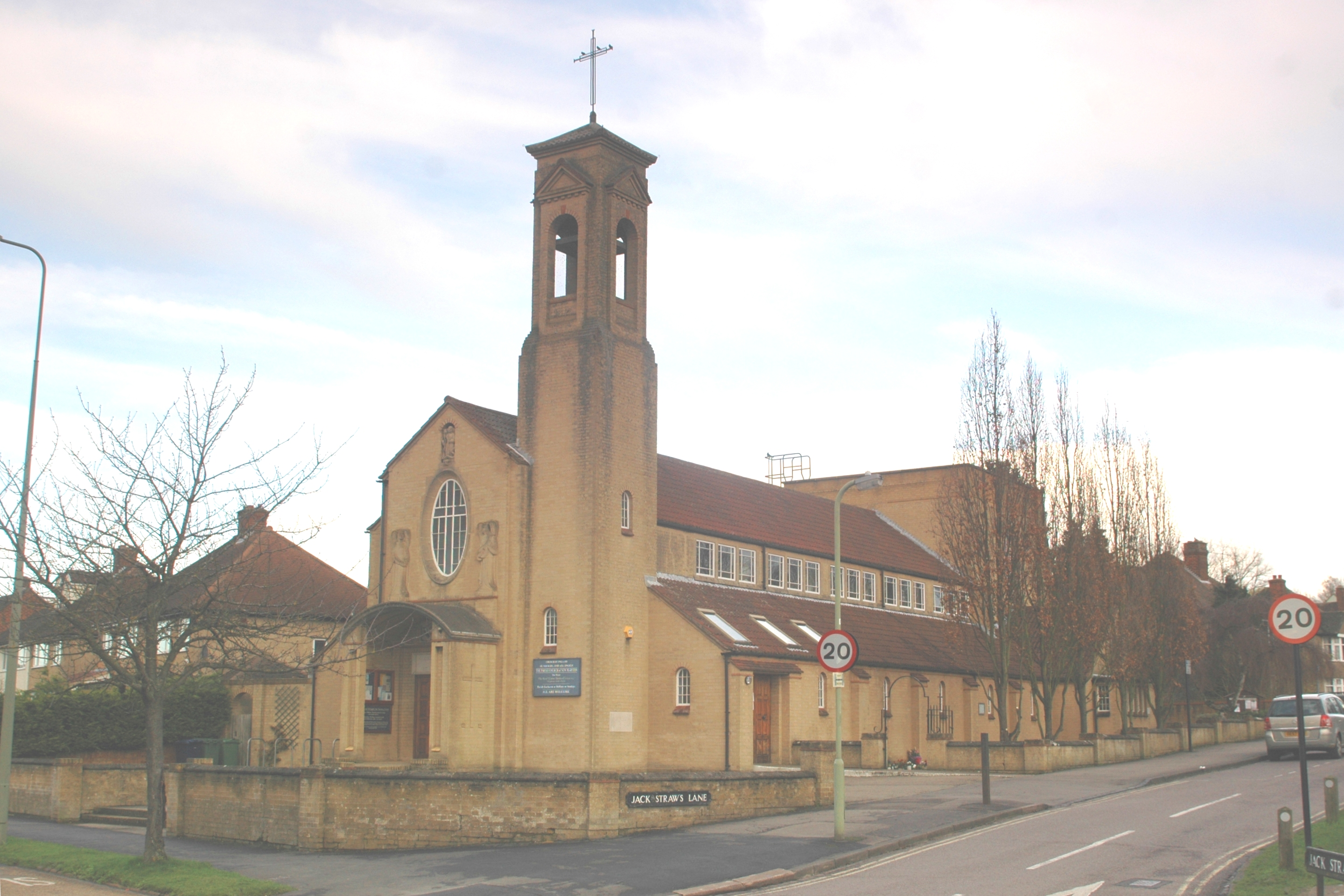
St Michael and All Angels parish church, New Marston, Oxford (1956), from the southwest

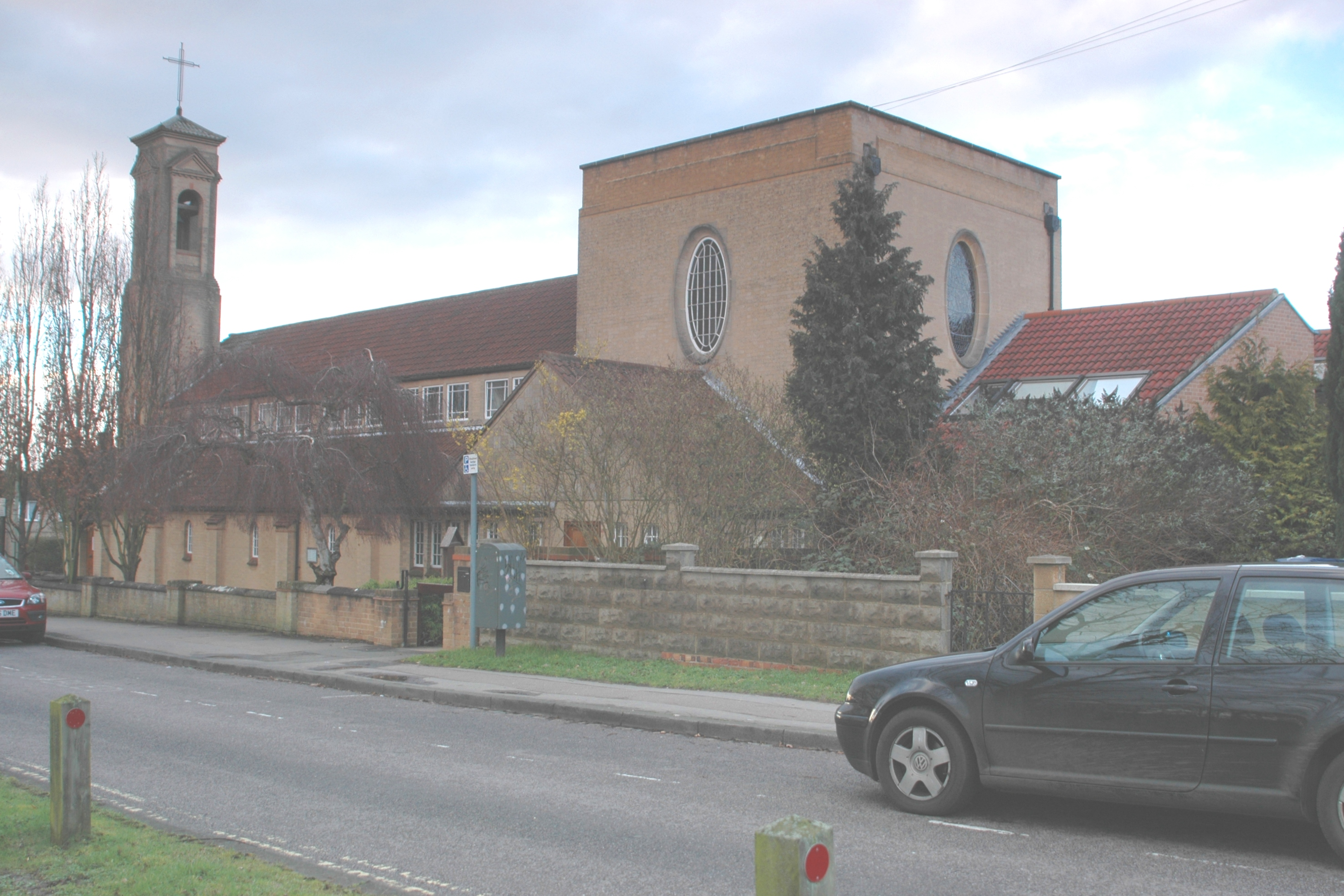
St Michael and All Angels parish church from the southeast

=== Buildings ===
- Bedford Park, London: studio house for an artist, 1908
- 40 Hampstead Way, Hampstead Garden Suburb, London, 1909
- Horn Park, Beaminster, Dorset, 1911
- Gates House, Wyldes Close, Hampstead Garden Suburb, London, 1915
- St Francis of Assisi, Cowley, Oxfordshire, 1930–31
- St Alban the Martyr parish church, Charles Street, Oxford, 1933
- Itchen Abbas, Hampshire: house, 1935
- Hook Manor, Semley, Wiltshire: remodelled 17th century Jacobean manor house, 1935
- Blessed Virgin Mary parish church, Thame, Oxfordshire: repairs to stonework, 1937–38
- Village Hall, Ickford, Buckinghamshire, 1946 (with Simon Dale)
- St Etheldreda's parish church, Horley, Oxfordshire: screen and rood loft, 1947–50
- St Michael and All Angels parish church, New Marston, Oxford, 1954–56
- St Swithun's parish church, Kennington, Berkshire (now in Oxfordshire), (with Rev. Stuart S. Davies) 1956–58
- Deddington Primary School, Oxfordshire: modernisation, new classroom etc., 1958
- 358 Woodstock Road, Oxford: house for Dale and his family
- Goddard's Green, Berkshire: restoration of a house
- St Mary Magdalene parish church, Lillington, Warwickshire: pulpit
- SS. Mary and Edburga's parish church, Stratton Audley, Oxfordshire: tower screen

=== Writings ===
- Dale, T. Lawrence (1933). Report on Beckley Parish Church. Oxford Architectural Society.
- Dale, T. Lawrence (1935). "Architectural notes (Faringdon, Great Coxwell Barn, Coleshill House, Kelmscott House, Langford Church)". Oxfordshire Archaeological Society Report. Oxfordshire Archaeological Society: 59ff.
- Dale, T. Lawrence (1937). "Architectural notes on 1937 excursion (Stone Church; Court House, Long Crendon; Hartwell House; Long Crendon Manor; Aylesbury; Thame Church)". Oxfordshire Archaeological Society Report. Oxfordshire Archaeological Society: 3ff.
- Dale, T. Lawrence (1941). Christ Church Mall: A Diversion.
- Dale, T. Lawrence (1944). Towards a Plan for Oxford City. London: Faber and Faber.

== Sources ==
- Brodie, Antonia; Felstead, Alison; Franklin, Jonathan; Pinfield, Leslie; Oldfield, Jane, eds. (2001). Directory of British Architects 1834–1914, A–K. London & New York: Continuum. p. 492. ISBN 0-8264-5513-1.
- Crossley, Alan; Elrington, C.R. (eds.); Chance, Eleanor; Colvin, Christina; Cooper, Janet; Day, C.J.; Hassall, T.G.; Selwyn, Nesta (1979). A History of the County of Oxford. Victoria County History. Vol. 4: The City of Oxford. pp. 369–412.
- Lobel, Mary D, ed. (1962). A History of the County of Oxford. Victoria County History. Vol. 7: Thame and Dorchester Hundreds. London: Oxford University Press for the Institute of Historical Research. pp. 199–219.
- Newman, John; Pevsner, Nikolaus (1972). Dorset. The Buildings of England. Harmondsworth: Penguin Books. p. 88. ISBN 0-14-071044-2.
- Pevsner, Nikolaus (1966). Berkshire. The Buildings of England. Harmondsworth: Penguin Books. p. 159.
- Salzman, L.F, ed. (1951). A History of the County of Warwick. Victoria County History. Vol. 6: Knightlow hundred. London: Oxford University Press for the Institute of Historical Research. pp. 161–164.
- Sharp, Thomas (1948). Oxford Replanned. London: The Architectural Press. pp. 113, 114.
- Sherwood, Jennifer; Pevsner, Nikolaus (1974). Oxfordshire. The Buildings of England. Harmondsworth: Penguin Books. pp. 334, 336, 337, 339, 653, 794, 795. ISBN 0-14-071045-0.
