= New Marston =

Suburb of Oxford, England

Coordinates: 51.763°N 1.235°W

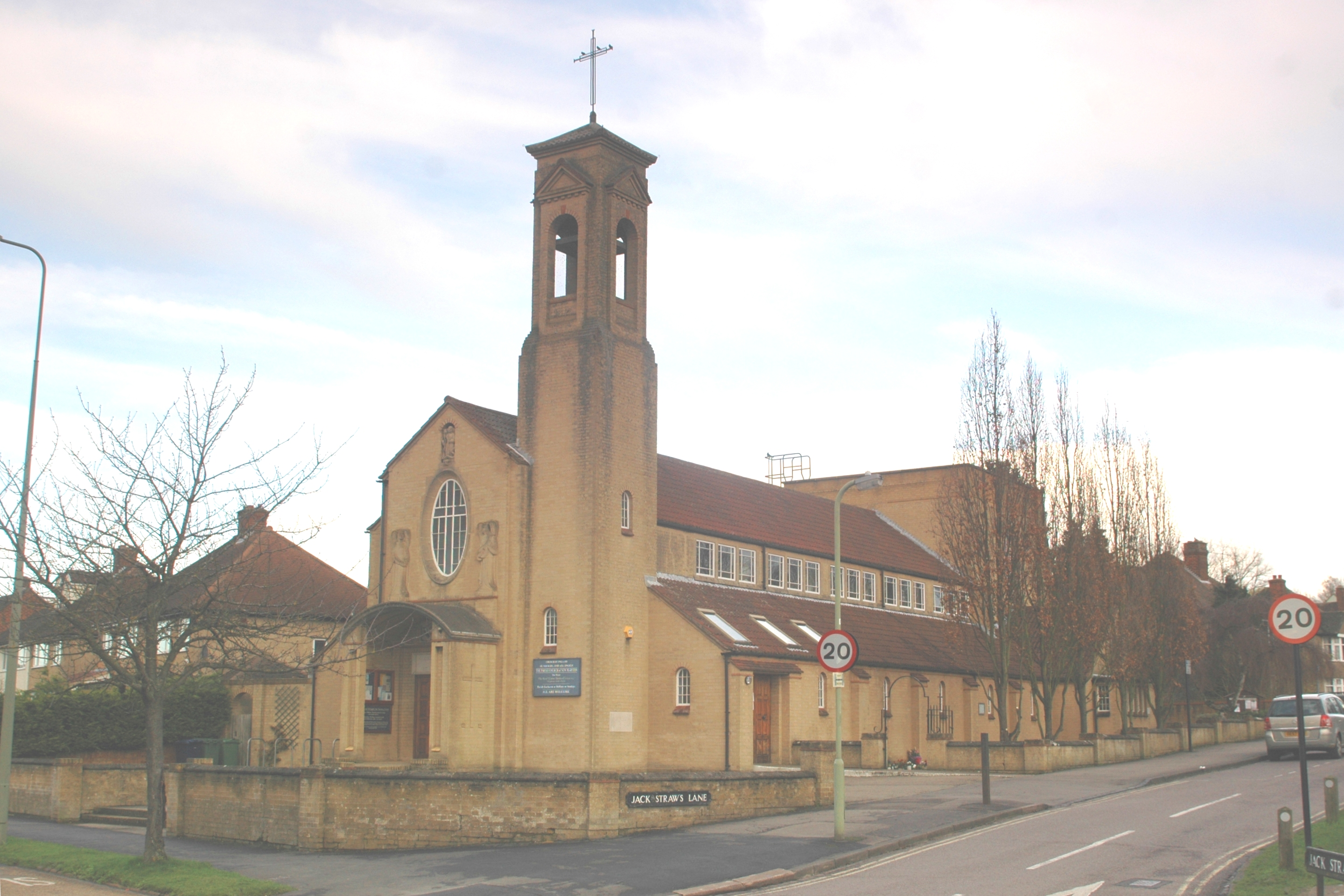
- St Michael & All Angels parish church

- Location within Oxfordshire
- OS grid reference: SP5207
- Civil parish: Marston
- District: Oxford
- Shire county: Oxfordshire
- Region: South East
- Country: England
- Sovereign state: United Kingdom
- Post town: Oxford
- Postcode district: OX3
- Dialling code: 01865
- Police: Thames Valley
- Fire: Oxfordshire
- Ambulance: South Central
- UK Parliament: Oxford East

New Marston is a suburb about 1.25 miles (2 km) northeast of the centre of Oxford, England.

== History ==
New Marston is built on land that was originally part of the manor of Headington. It was rural until the 19th century, when housing began to develop along Marston Road from St Clement's towards the village of Marston. The first residential development appears to have occurred in the area of William Street, Edgeway Road and Ferry Road. The 1886–1890 OS County Series map of Oxfordshire shows William Street sub-dividend in to a number of plots but only two significant buildings and a single dwelling on Edgeway Road. By the time of the 1899 edition of the same map Ferry Road has been extended in a Westerly direction to its modern extent and along with William Street, the southern side of Edgeway Road, and adjoining parts of Marston Road, had seen significant development. Development of New Marston appears to have stalled between the turn of the century and the 1920s, the 1921 map shows little change from the 1899 edition save for the Northern side of Edgeway Road and the site of present-day Hugh Allen Crescent being designated as allotments (the land would be developed in 1930), and the addition of the Wadham College Cricket Ground to the North.

New Marston seems to have received a mains water supply by the end of the 1870s and mains drainage by the 1920s.

New Marston's main development was in the 20th century, shortly after 216 acres of land were incorporated within the boundary of Oxford City in 1929, when the County Borough of Oxford developed estates of council houses around Marston Road and north of Headley Way. The County Borough had built 138 council houses at New Marston by 1938 and added another 70 after 1950.

== Cycle Path ==
New Marston benefits from a cycle path linking Ferry Road to South Parks Road, the University Parks and the city centre. The cycle path is notable for its scenic nature passing through the New Marston Meadows SSSI, over the River Cherwell (and various mill streams) and along the Southern edge of the University Parks. A variety of wildlife can frequently be seen from the cycle path including Deer, Kingfishers, and Grey Herons.

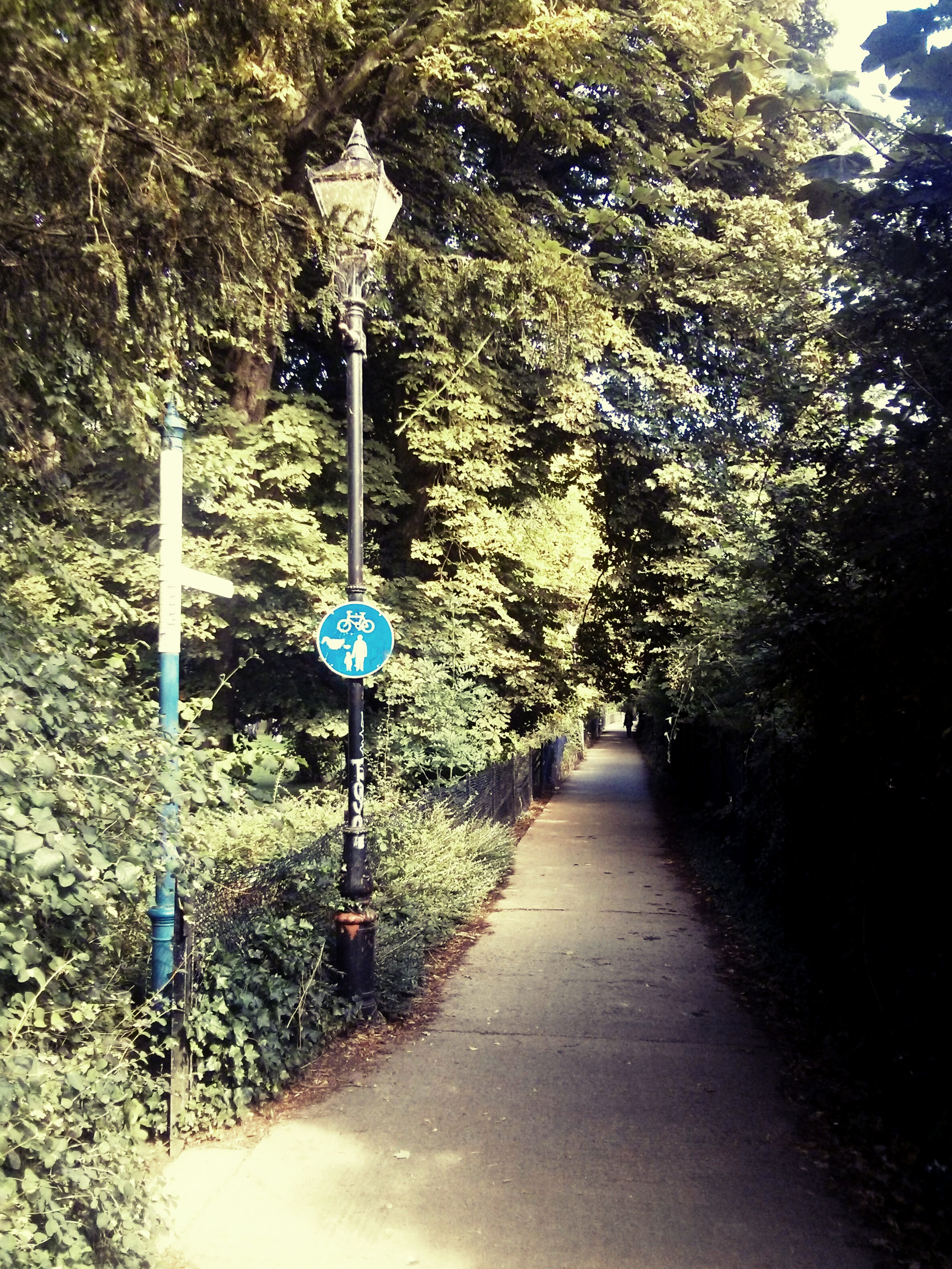
Marston cycle path.

== Churches ==
Cowley Road Congregational Church opened a mission hall in New Marston in 1885. This was replaced by a new building opened in 1939. It is now Marston United Reformed Church.

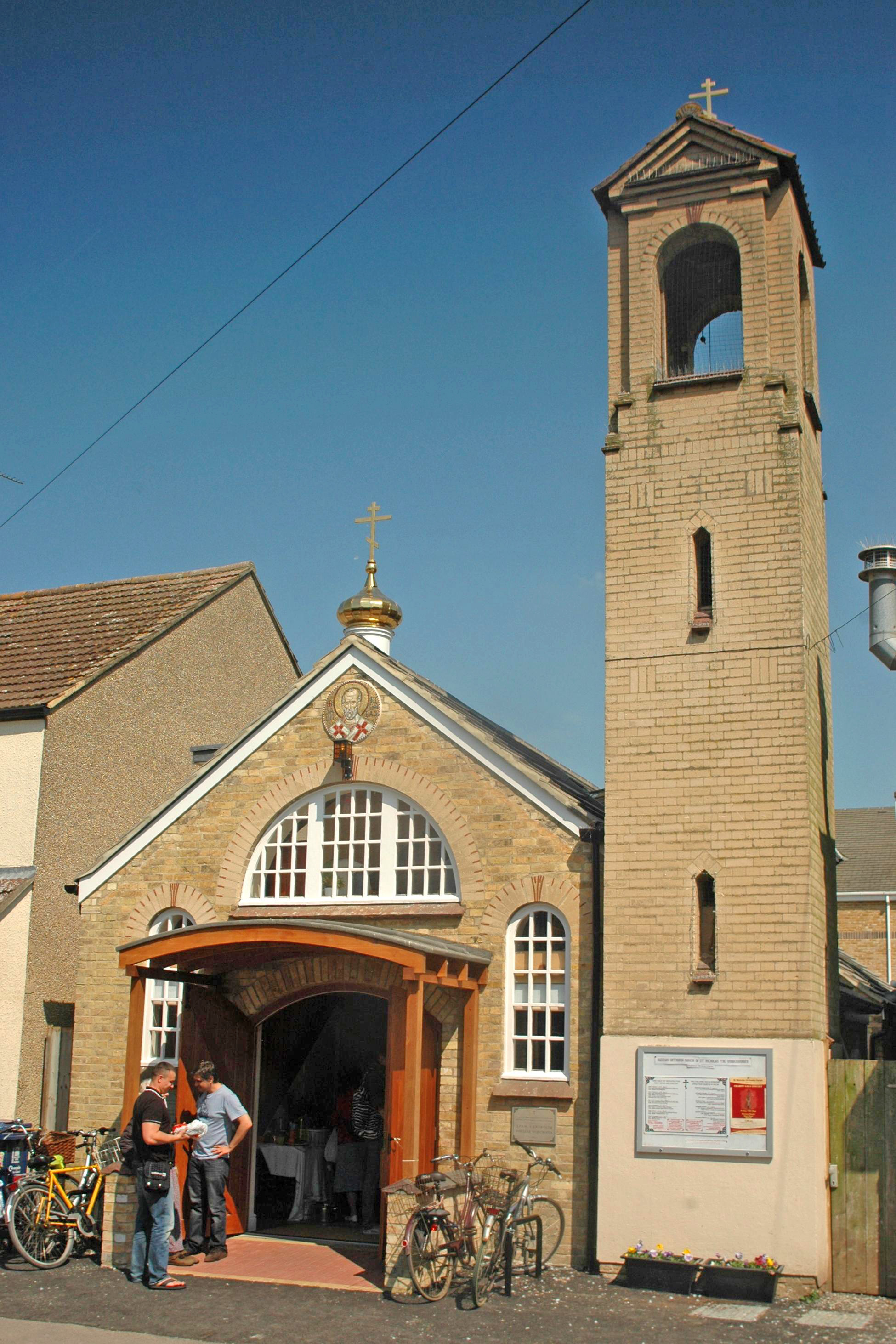
The former Church of England mission hall, now the Russian Orthodox church of St Nicholas the Wonderworker.

In 1919 the Church of England parish of St Nicholas, Marston opened a mission hall in Ferry Road to serve the parts of New Marston that had been built by that time. Somewhat later a campanile was added, its style and sand-lime brick suggesting that it is the work of the then Oxford Diocesan Architect T. Lawrence Dale.

In 1954-56 Saint Michael and All Angels parish church was built on Marston Road at the corner of Jack Straw's Lane as a chapel of ease for the parish of St Andrew, Headington. St Michael's was consecrated in September 1955 and superseded the Ferry Road mission hall, which was then deconsecrated and sold for secular use. In 1963 the Diocese of Oxford constituted St Michael's as a parish church, with its new parish formed from parts of Headington, Marston and St Clement's parishes.

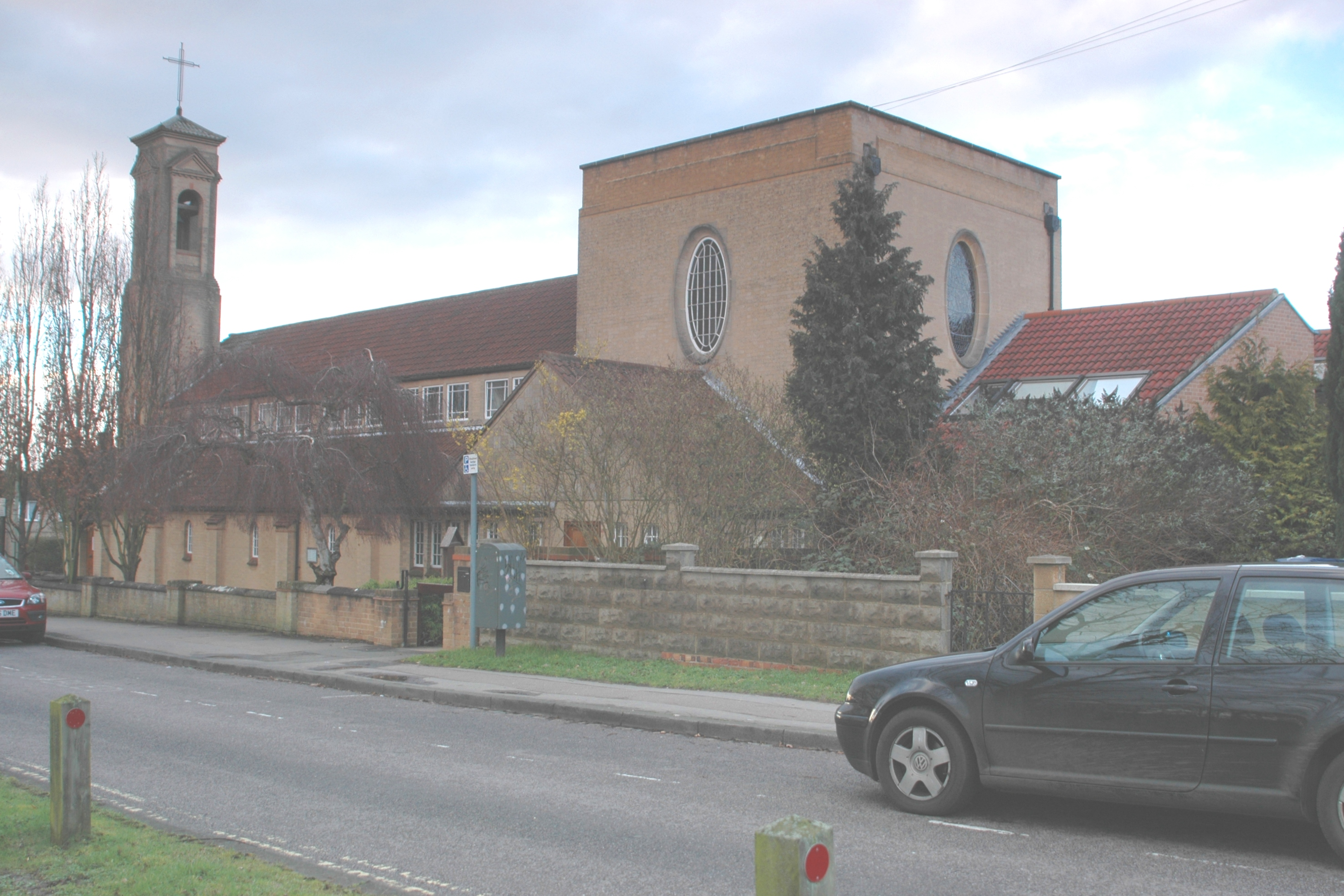
St Michael & All Angels parish church from the southeast.

St Michael's was designed by T. Lawrence Dale in a "vaguely Italian renaissance style" that includes a slender campanile for its single bell. It has a statue of St Michael by Michael Groser and a reredos painted by Leon Underwood. St Michael's is unusual for its elliptical windows and for its tall, box-like chancel.

The Russian Orthodox Diocese of Sourozh established the parish of Saint Nicholas the Wonderworker in Oxford in 2006. The congregation worshipped in rented premises until 2010, when it acquired the former Church of England mission hall in Ferry Road and restored it to use as a church. The Russian congregation has added a small onion dome and a small mosaic picture of St Nicholas to the south gable of the building.

== Schools ==
New Marston Church of England School in Marston Road opened in 1928 and became St Michael's Church of England Aided Primary School in 1955.

Milham Ford School, a girls' secondary school that had been founded in Cowley Place in 1906, moved to newly built and larger premises in Marston Road in 1939. The school was closed in 2003 and its premises sold to Oxford Brookes University.

Infant and junior mixed schools were opened in Copse Lane north of Headley Way in 1948. They are now New Marston Primary School.

== Sources ==
- Crossley, Alan; Elrington, C.R. (eds.); Chance, Eleanor; Colvin, Christina; Cooper, Janet; Day, C.J.; Hassall, T.G.; Selwyn, Nesta (1979). A History of the County of Oxford, Volume 4. Victoria County History.
- Sherwood, Jennifer; Pevsner, Nikolaus (1974). Oxfordshire. The Buildings of England. Harmondsworth: Penguin Books. pp. 336–337. ISBN 0-14-071045-0.
