= Link road =

Road that links two major urban areas

A link road is a transport infrastructure road that links two conurbations or other major road transport facilities, often added because of increasing road traffic. They can be controversial, especially if they threaten to destroy natural habitat and greenfield land.

The term is used in the United Kingdom, Australia, and the United States state of Nebraska. An example of a link road is Marston Ferry Road in Oxford, England. It was built in the late 20th century to link North Oxford with Marston, Oxford to the east.

== See also ==
- Alternate route
- Bypass
- Beltway
