= Horley, Oxfordshire =

Village in Oxfordshire, England

Coordinates: 52.091°N 1.391°W

Horley
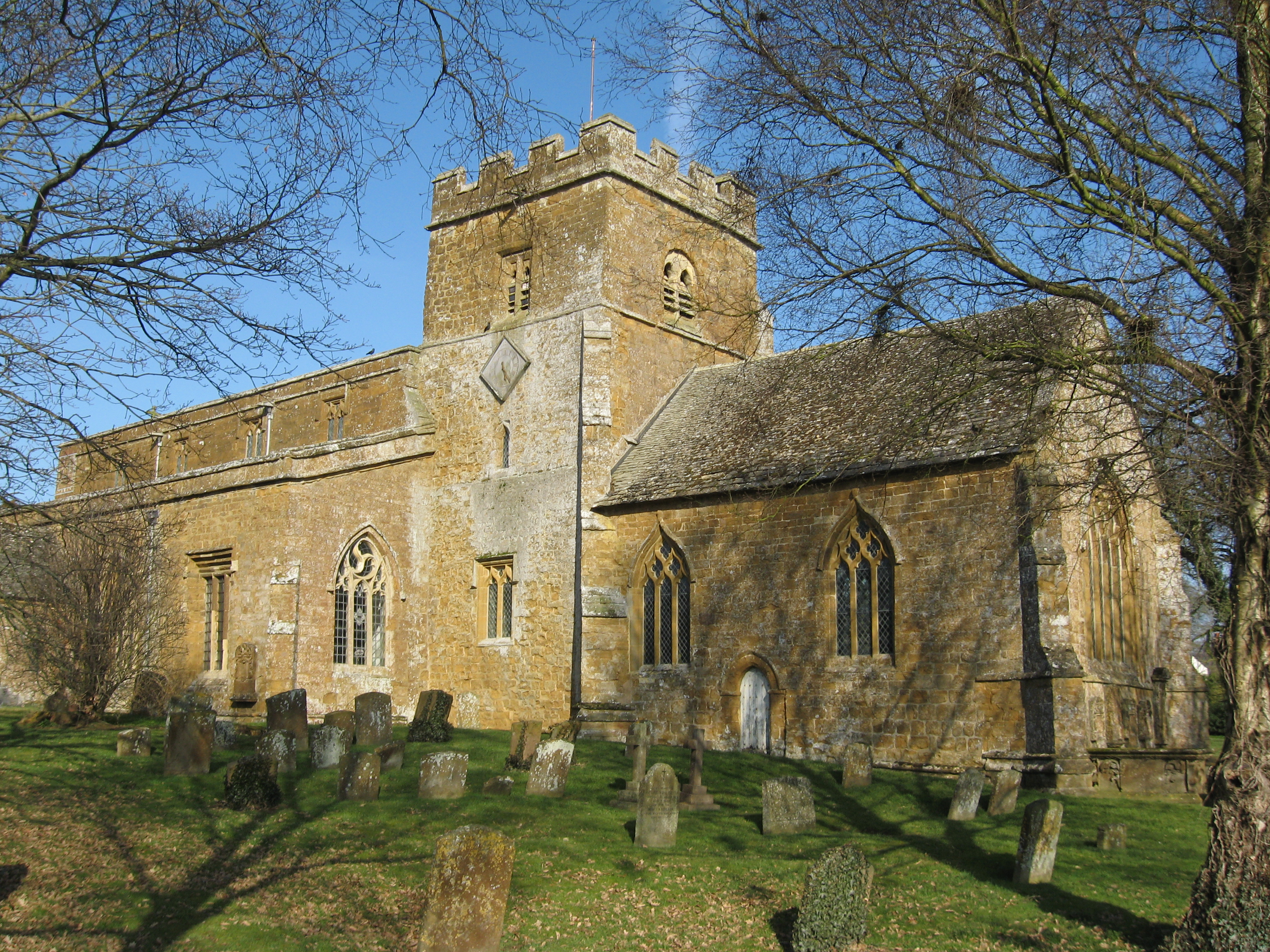
- St Etheldreda's parish church

- Location within Oxfordshire
- Area: 4.68 km^{2} (1.81 sq mi)
- Population: 336 (2011 census)
  - Density: 72/km^{2} (190/sq mi)
- OS grid reference: SP4143
- Civil parish: Horley
- District: Cherwell
- Shire county: Oxfordshire
- Region: South East
- Country: England
- Sovereign state: United Kingdom
- Post town: Banbury
- Postcode district: OX15
- Dialling code: 01295
- Police: Thames Valley
- Fire: Oxfordshire
- Ambulance: South Central
- UK Parliament: Banbury
- Website: Horley Village

Horley is a village and civil parish in the north of Oxfordshire about 3 miles (5 km) north-west of Banbury.

== Amenities ==
Horley has one public house, the Red Lion. Horley Cricket Club has boys' and men's teams. Its men's team plays in Cherwell Cricket League Divisions 3 and 6 and a Sunday mixed adult team is run. An amateur dramatic society, Horley Footlights, has staged productions in the village every year since 2003.

== St. Etheldreda's church ==
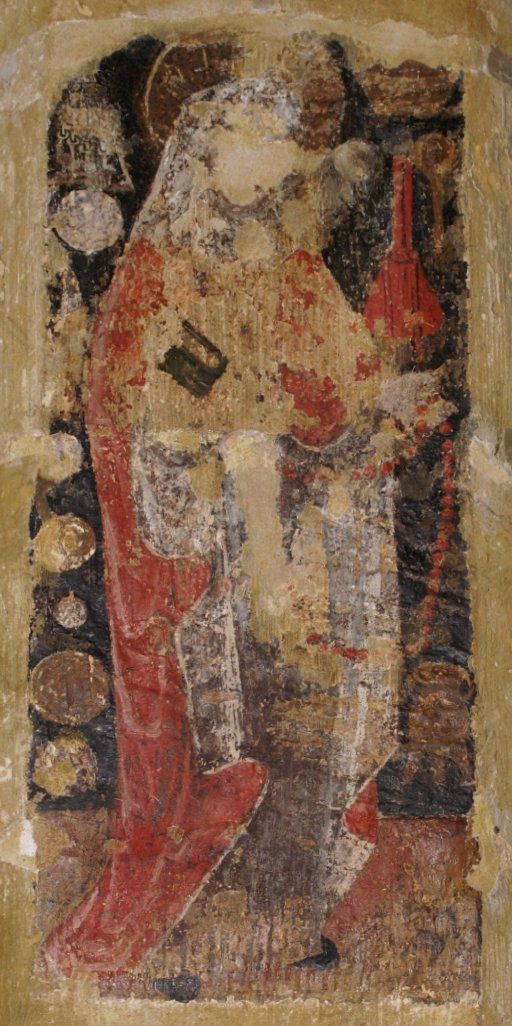
Wall painting of St. Zita in St. Etheldreda's parish church

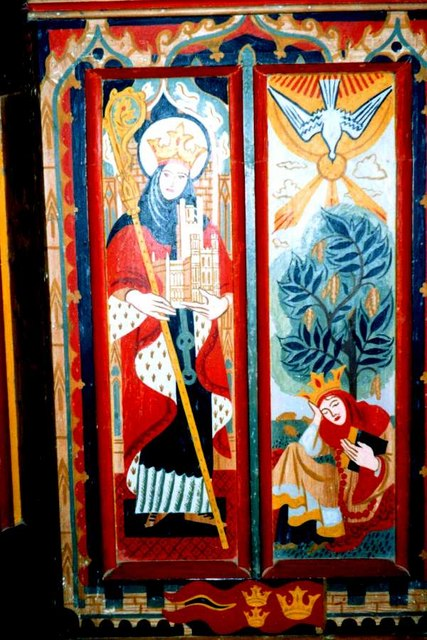
Painting of St. Etheldreda on the rood screen designed by T. L. Dale and added in 1947–50

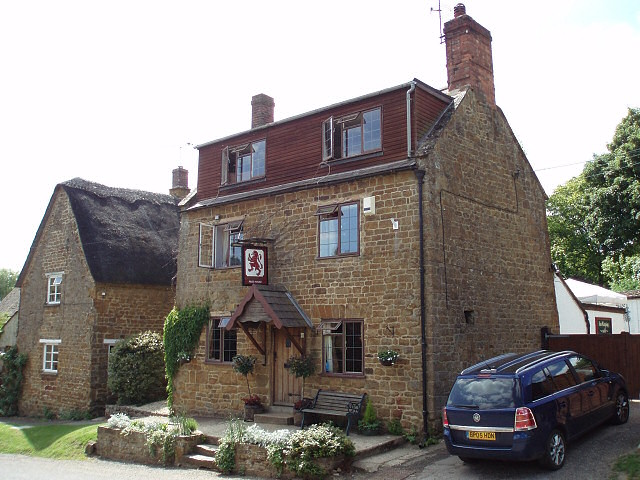
The Red Lion public house

The Church of England parish church of Saint Etheldreda, along with the church of St. John the Baptist, Hornton were dependent chapelries of King's Sutton until the middle of the 15th century. St. Etheldreda's is built of local Hornton stone. The church existed by the late 12th century and its Norman central belltower and much of its chancel date from about 1180. Early in the 13th century the nave was replaced with one with north and south aisles and a higher roof.

Early in the 14th century the chancel and both aisles were rebuilt and the south aisle and chancel were given new Decorated Gothic windows. Little of the 13th century nave and aisles now survives except the west wall and three Early English doorways. A clerestory was added to the nave and a porch was added to the repositioned south door. The tower buttresses may have been added at this time. Early in the 15th century the north wall of the north aisle was rebuilt, retaining the 13th century north doorway but gaining new Perpendicular Gothic windows. In about 1600 the west window was replaced with a three-light square-headed one.

Early in the 17th century the chancel was in disrepair and the lay rector was repeatedly asked to fund repairs. In 1621 the chancel was reported to be so "ruinous and much decayed" that the rain came in. In 1632 the rest of the church was alleged to be "ready to fall". The tracery, in part of the east window, was rebuilt c1760 and two of the north windows of the chancel was replaced. By 1879 St. Etheldreda's needed a thorough restoration and the vicar privately wrote that he feared for the safety of the tower. However, the tower was not put in good order until 1915, when the church was restored under the direction of the Scottish architect William Weir.

In 1947–50 the Oxford Diocesan Surveyor T. Lawrence Dale added a chancel screen and rood loft. Dale described this work as "One of the most enjoyable things he ever did", likening it to "putting new wine into an old bottle". St. Etheldreda's interior has Medieval wall paintings: a large and well-preserved one of Saint Christopher, on the north wall, and a rare one of Saint Zita, on the north nave pillar. The tower was repaired in 1785; a stair parapet was removed early in the 19th century. It had a ring of four bells, cast by William and Henry III Bagley of Chacombe in 1706. However two further bells, by John Taylor & Co, were added in 2013. St. Etheldreda's is now one of eight ecclesiastical parishes in the Ironstone Benefice.

== Oxfordshire Ironstone Railway ==
The Oxfordshire Ironstone Railway was built during The First World War to carry ironstone from a quarry west of Horley to a junction with the Great Western Railway just north of Banbury. The ironstone railway passed just south of Horley, where a concrete bridge carried the railway over the Horley–Wroxton road. The railway was opened in 1917 and closed in 1967.

== Sources ==
- Lobel, Mary D; Crossley, Alan, eds. (1969). A History of the County of Oxford: Volume 9. Victoria County History. pp. 123–139.
- Sherwood, Jennifer; Pevsner, Nikolaus (1974). Oxfordshire. The Buildings of England. Harmondsworth: Penguin Books. pp. 652–653. ISBN 0-14-071045-0.
- Tonks, Eric (April 1988). The Ironstone Quarries of the Midlands Part 2: The Oxfordshire Field. Cheltenham: Runpast Publishing. p. 146. ISBN 1-870-754-026.
- Walker, George Graham (1975). Churches of the Banbury Area. Kineton: Roundwood Press. p. 29. ISBN 0-900093-52-8.
