= Cherwell School =

The Cherwell School
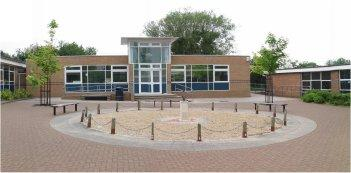

Location
- Marston Ferry Road; Oxford, Oxfordshire, OX2 7EE; England; 51°46′30″N 1°15′41″W

Information
- Type: Academy
- Established: 1963
- Local authority: Oxfordshire
- Specialist: Science College
- Department for Education URN: 137970 Tables
- Ofsted: Reports
- Headteacher: Chris Price
- Gender: Coeducational
- Age: 11 to 18
- Enrolment: 2082
- Colours: Light blue, navy blue
- Website: www.cherwell.oxon.sch.uk

The Cherwell School is a secondary school with academy status on the Marston Ferry Road in Oxford, England. The current school site was built in 1963 as a secondary modern school, later becoming the main comprehensive school for North Oxford, with a catchment area extending down to the city centre, Grandpont, and New Hinksey. Along with later expansions, in 2003, and as part of a citywide reorganisation, it merged with the Frideswide Middle School, and is now a split site school of c.2,000 pupils aged between 11 and 18. The Cherwell School is part of River Learning Trust.

== Changes ==
The north site has undergone construction work, with the extension of the sixth form common room. The original design, to accommodate only 100 pupils in years 12 and 13, became inadequate in recent years for the 300 or more pupils currently in the sixth form. A notable change to the north site of the Cherwell School is the creation of female-only toilets located by the music block – previously, only unisex toilets being available.

The main building work was the construction of a new building alongside the existing block, and then removing the internal wall to create a much larger space. On the second floor of the structure, the school library has been extended to include quiet study areas, each with computer and desk facilities.

== Notable alumni ==
Cherwell School alumni are called Cherwellians:

- Tom Bateman, actor.
- Joey Beauchamp, footballer.
- Sholto Carnegie, rower.
- Canice Carroll, footballer.
- Mark Crozer, musician.
- Hannah England, middle-distance runner and World Championship 1500m silver medallist.
- Rupert Friend, actor.
- Tim Goldsworthy, record producer, discjockey, and co-founder of Mo'Wax record label.
- Ramin Gray, playwright.
- Orlando Higginbottom, also known as Totally Enormous Extinct Dinosaurs, electro producer, and discjockey.
- Benjamin Hope, painter.
- Adam Hunt, chess International Master.
- James Lavelle, member of music group UNKLE and founder of Mo'Wax record label.
- Yasmin Le Bon née Yasmin Parvaneh, model and wife of Simon Le Bon, singer in band Duran Duran.
- Jack Letts, jihadist.
- Michael Morris, cricketer
- Maud Muir, rugby player for England (Red Roses).
- Tom Penny, skateboarder.
- Carrie Quinlan, actress and comedy writer.
- Omid Scobie, journalist and writer.
- Rachel Seiffert, novelist
- Sophie Sumner, model.
- Miles Welch-Hayes, footballer for Oxford United.
- Bertie Bageint, Conductor
- Kate Whitley, Composer
- Liam Taylor West, Composer
- Jake Halsey Jones, West End actor
- Anya De Villiers, West End Actor
