= Jack Letts =

Alleged member of Islamic State

- Born: Jack Abraham Letts; November 14, 1995; Oxford, Oxfordshire, England

Jack Abraham Letts (born 14 November 1995) is a British born Canadian Muslim accused of being a member of the Islamic State (IS). He was given the nickname Jihadi Jack by the British media.

== Early life ==
Letts was born in Oxford to a Canadian father and British mother. He attended Cherwell School. He converted to Islam and was said by his parents to have developed severe obsessive–compulsive disorder (OCD). Letts attended various local mosques and learned Arabic in order to read the Quran.

== Alleged links with IS ==
Letts said that he travelled to Kuwait in May 2014 and to Syria in September of that same year.

Media interest in Letts began in January 2016, when journalist Richard Kerbaj of The Sunday Times accused him of joining IS, a claim Letts and his parents said was untrue. In June 2016, Letts stated that his journey to the Middle East was part of his "search for truth", and denied ever having been a member of IS. He stated that he went to Syria "to spread the religion of Allah and to help Muslims. I can speak Arabic and English. That's my only skill."

Letts denied claims that he adopted the name Abu Mohammed while in the Middle East. While in Syria, Letts married a local woman who later had a child whom Letts has never met.

In 2016, Letts stated, "I'm not ISIS, but I believe in the Sharia; I also think that whatever I say, the media will probably freestyle with it and make up more nicknames for me." When questioned about the treatment of Muslims in Syria, he said, "The Muslims in Syria are burned alive, raped, abused, imprisoned and much more. I also think that some of Muslims I met here are living like walking mountains. Full of honour". When asked if he was a terrorist, he stated: "Do you mean by the English government's definition, that anyone that opposes a non-Islamic system and man-made laws? Then, of course, by that definition, I suppose they'd say I'm a terrorist, khalas ("and that's that"). He also said, "that doesn't mean I am with you, the dirty non-Muslims".

On 7 May 2017, Letts stated that he hated IS "more than the Americans hate them".

Letts has claimed that he was imprisoned by IS on three occasions, and lived in hiding with others who stood against IS inside Raqqa.

Letts's parents were under restrictions imposed by Mr Justice Saunders; the UK media were therefore unable to report anything they may have known about their son's opinions or activities while he was in Syria.

Letts shared a photograph of himself in 2015 performing a Muslim one-finger salute with Mosul Dam in the background. The dam was within IS-controlled territory at the time.

In October 2018, Conservative Party of Canada leader Andrew Scheer criticized liberal parliament members of the Government of Canada for trying to negotiate Letts's release. In doing so, he described Letts as "a known terrorist fighter" and as "British terrorist Jihadi Jack, a UK citizen, who may or may not have ever set foot in Canada". In response, John Letts wrote an open letter to Scheer, sending copies to all Members of Parliament,

to challenge the misinformation that has appeared in the Canadian media recently ... Mr Scheer confidently claimed that Jack is 'a known jihadi fighter' ... If Mr Scheer has any evidence that our son is a 'known jihadi fighter' he has a duty to report this information to the Canadian and British authorities. No such evidence has ever been passed to us, or to our lawyers in the UK

The letter states that the family tried to present proof of their son's innocence to the RCMP and the Canadian Security Intelligence Service (CSIS), but their attempts to arrange a meeting were declined under the Trudeau Government.

In June 2019, the BBC reported an interview with Letts in 2018, in which he said IS used to "encourage you in a sort of indirect way" to put on a suicide vest. He said he made it obvious to militants at the time that "if there was a battle, I'm ready", but that he believed suicide attacks were forbidden in Islamic law.

== Detention by Kurdish forces ==
Letts was detained by the Kurdish YPG militia after trying to escape from the Battle of Raqqa. The BBC interviewed him from prison in June 2017. Letts stated he was detained while seeking to escape IS-held territory.

After Letts informed his parents he was in Kurdish custody, they asked the British authorities for help. The Foreign Office replied that they could not help them, due to the lack of consular services in Syria and Iraq; they were told that British government policy was not to help any British citizens return from Syria. Letts initially told the BBC: "I don't want anyone to help me", but later requested help returning to the UK, and said he was happy to be arrested and put on trial for any crime the police claim he has committed.

In October 2017, Letts's parents staged a seven-day hunger strike to bring attention to his case. They claimed their son was tortured in prison and "have not heard from him for months". On 10 November 2017, they launched a petition to "Secure the release of Jack Letts who is detained in northern Syria".

Throughout Letts's time in prison, the UK government has refused to request his extradition, a diplomatic situation in which the Canadian government has intervened. Under Canadian nationality law, Letts holds Canadian citizenship via his Canadian-born father. In January 2018, Canadian diplomatic officials reportedly spoke to Letts, who asked them to allow him to come to Canada. Letts's parents reportedly received a letter from the Canadian government saying it was "making every effort to assist" Letts. In October 2018, Canadian consular assistance for Letts stalled, due to mounting pressure from both the Conservative opposition and the British government.

On 22 February 2018, ITV News published an "exclusive" interview with Letts, who was under detention by Kurdish officials. In the interview, Letts requested that the British Government allow him to phone his parents (who were still in court over terrorism-funding charges). Letts also mentioned that he would prefer if the two women who were in a similar situation at that time (Shamima Begum and Hoda Muthana) would be prioritised over his own case.

In 2023, Letts's mother, Sally Lane, published a book about her son and her perspective of the events, titled Reasonable Cause to Suspect: A Mother's Ordeal to Save Her Son from a Kurdish Prison.

== Legal cases ==
=== Parents' funding terrorism conviction ===
On 9 June 2016, Letts's parents appeared at Westminster Magistrates' Court, charged with funding terrorism. The court heard that the couple had tried to send money to their son on three occasions between September 2015 and January 2016. Sally Lane and John Letts claim the police gave them permission to send Letts funds to help him escape from IS territory. They were remanded in custody. After spending five days in prison, their bail was reinstated following a hearing at the Old Bailey.

Appearing at the Old Bailey in June 2016, they denied three counts of funding terrorism, and were released on conditional bail. A trial was set for January 2017, but the case was delayed as the couple was given permission to challenge the charges against them 'on a point of law' in the Supreme Court. Their trial at the Old Bailey continued on 22 May 2019, and on 21 June 2019 they were found guilty of funding terrorism, for sending their son £223, and sentenced to 15 months imprisonment, suspended for 12 months.

=== Repatriation ===
Jack's parents have been campaigning for their son's release ever since. A Canadian delegation consisting of a Senator, diplomat, human rights advocate and lawyer were able to visit Jack in the Syrian prison where he was being held in August 2023 and gather evidence related to the conditions of his detention.

In March 2024, the legal team retained by Jack's parents took the rare step of seeking a reconsideration and full hearing before the Supreme Court of Canada against a decision by the Federal Court of Appeal that International Law does not obligate Canada to repatriate him. The Canadian Supreme Court refused to hear the case.

== British citizenship revoked ==
On 18 August 2019 it was reported that the British government had revoked Letts's British citizenship. However, the Home Office declined to comment on the case. In response, Canadian Public Safety Minister Ralph Goodale described the move as a "unilateral action to off-load [the UK's consular] responsibilities," leaving Canada responsible for further diplomatic assistance for Letts.
