= Michael Morris (cricketer) =

English cricketer

Personal information
- Full name: Michael John Morris
- Born: 8 March 1969 (age 57); Melbourne, Victoria, Australia
- Batting: Right-handed
- Bowling: Unknown

Domestic team information
- Years: Team
- 1989–1991: Cambridge University

Career statistics
| Competition | First-class |
|---|---|
| Matches | 25 |
| Runs scored | 452 |
| Batting average | 13.29 |
| 100s/50s | –/1 |
| Top score | 60 |
| Balls bowled | 18 |
| Wickets | 0 |
| Bowling average | – |
| 5 wickets in innings | – |
| 10 wickets in match | – |
| Best bowling | – |
| Catches/stumpings | 10/– |
- Source: Cricinfo, 2 January 2022

Michael John Morris (born 8 March 1969) is an Australian-born English former first-class cricketer.

Morris was born at Melbourne in March 1969, but moved to England where he was educated in Oxford at Cherwell School. From there he went up to Pembroke College, Cambridge. While studying at Cambridge, he played first-class cricket for Cambridge University Cricket Club from 1989 to 1991, making 25 appearances. Playing as a middle order batsman in the Cambridge side, he scored 452 runs in his 25 matches at an average of 13.29, with a highest score of 60; this score was the only time he passed 50.
