= The Perch, Binsey =

Pub in Binsey, Oxfordshire, England

Coordinates: 51°45′57″N 1°17′14″W

The Perch Inn
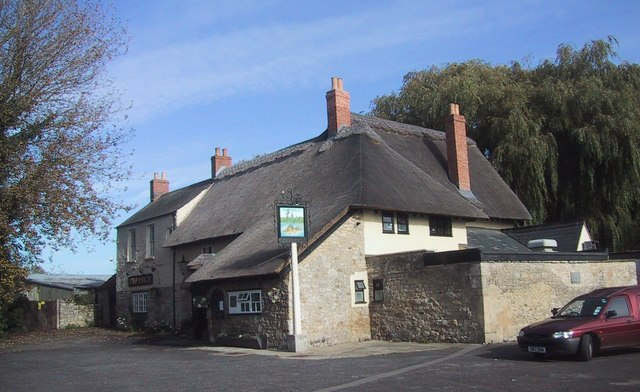
- The Perch at Binsey from the car park, October 2009
- Interactive map of the The Perch Inn area

General information
- Location: Binsey, Oxfordshire, England
- Construction started: 17th century
- Completed: 18th century

Technical details
- Structural system: Plastered rubble w. thatch roof Red brick w. tile or slate roof (additions)

The Perch is a historic public house in the village of Binsey, Oxfordshire, England, northwest of Oxford and close to the River Thames, overlooking Port Meadow.

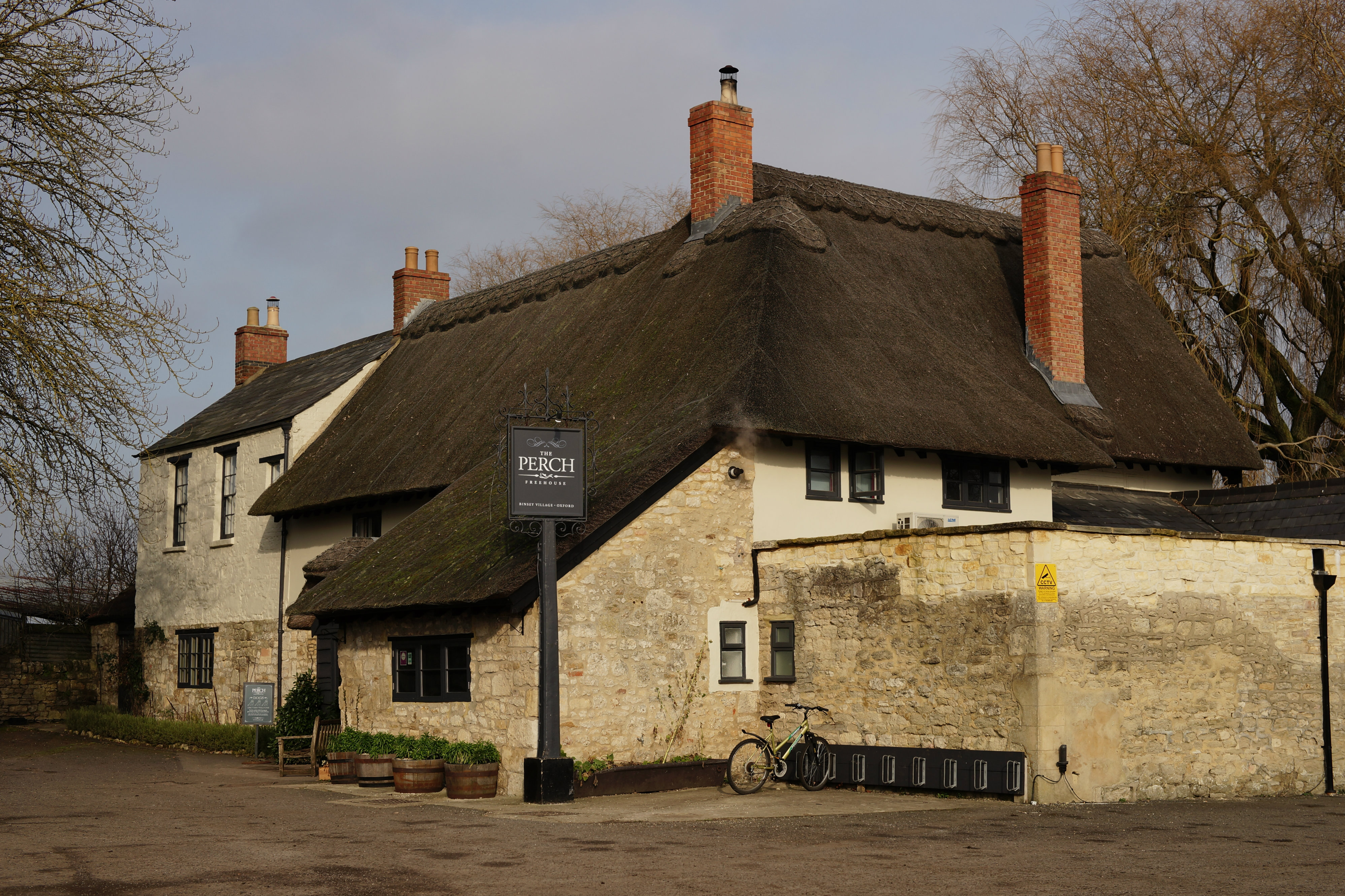
The Perch, January 2017

== History ==
The Perch dates back 800 years, and the current building, a Grade II listed building, to at least the 17th century. It is said to be haunted by a sailor. The Perch, together with most of the other buildings in Binsey, is owned by Christ Church in nearby Oxford. The Perch was extensively damaged by fire in 1977 and again in 2007. It re-opened in September 2008.

== Literary connections ==
The Perch is close to an avenue of poplars made famous by Gerard Manley Hopkins in his poem "Binsey Poplars", written when he found the riverside trees felled. The replacements for these trees, which stretch from Binsey to Godstow, lasted until 2004, when the present replantings began. The Perch was frequented by author Lewis Carroll and is noted as one of the first places that he gave public readings of Alice in Wonderland. It was also a favourite of C. S. Lewis and features in the Inspector Morse fictions.

== Historic jazz venue ==
From 1928 to 1948, the Perch was popular among Oxford University students as a venue to hear the latest jazz. Although it ceased to be a jazz venue after 1949, in 2009 the Perch was named by the Brecon Jazz Festival as one of 12 venues which had made the most important contributions to jazz music in the United Kingdom.

== See also ==
- The Trout Inn, Lower Wolvercote
- Victoria Arms, Marston
