= Victoria Arms, Marston =

Pub in Oxford, England

Coordinates: 51.7770°N 1.2474°W

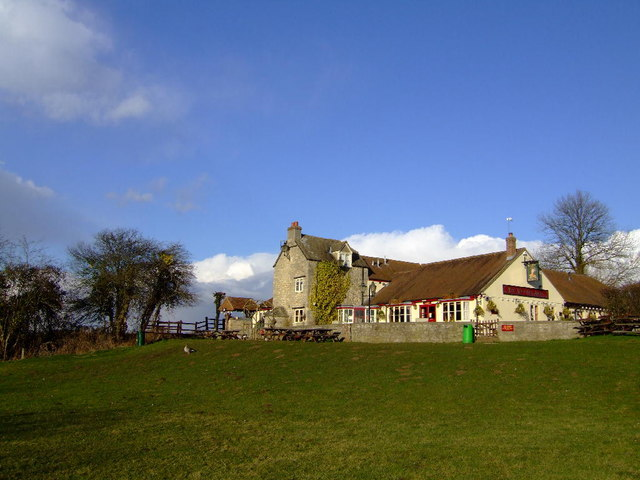
The Victoria Arms pub on the River Cherwell, just north of Marston Ferry Road.

The Victoria Arms (known locally as the Vicky Arms and formerly as the Ferry Inn) is a pub on the eastern bank of the River Cherwell at the end of Mill Lane close to Old Marston, northeast of Oxford, England.

There was once a ford across the Cherwell here, in use since the 12th century. An inn was originally constructed during the 17th century and was then rebuilt in 1840. It was closed in 1958 and bought by the Oxford Preservation Trust in 1961. Publicans Fred and Ruby Elkins took over the buildings and operated the pub as a free house. During this time they added extensions to the old buildings. They also operated the small wooden line-ferry across the Cherwell for many years before the opening of the link road. It was later leased to the brewery Wadworth's, refurbished, and reopened in 1986.

The pub is frequented by people out punting during the summer. It is possible to moor punts in the grounds of the pub. There was a line-ferry across the river here until 1971, when the Marston Ferry Road was built just to the south.

The Victoria Arms featured in the Inspector Morse television series a number of times. Most notably, Morse recited part of the A. E. Housman poem How Clear, How Lovely Bright here in the final episode of the series. A line from the poem was used for the title of the episode "The Remorseful Day".

== See also ==
- The Perch, Binsey
- The Trout Inn, Lower Wolvercote
