= Hornton =

Village in Oxfordshire, England

Coordinates: 52.102°N 1.427°W

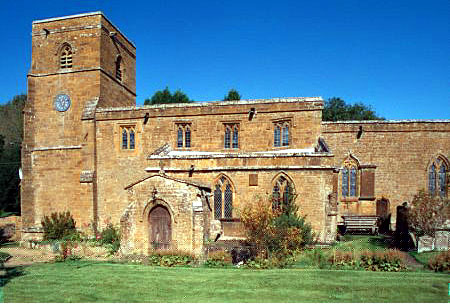
- St. John the Baptist parish church

- Location within Oxfordshire
- Area: 5.90 km^{2} (2.28 sq mi)
- Population: 328 (2011 census)
  - Density: 56/km^{2} (150/sq mi)
- OS grid reference: SP3945
- Civil parish: Hornton
- District: Cherwell
- Shire county: Oxfordshire
- Region: South East
- Country: England
- Sovereign state: United Kingdom
- Post town: Banbury
- Postcode district: OX15
- Dialling code: 01295
- Police: Thames Valley
- Fire: Oxfordshire
- Ambulance: South Central
- UK Parliament: Banbury
- Website: Community website

Hornton is a village and civil parish about 3 miles (5 km) northwest of Banbury in Oxfordshire.

== Churches ==
The oldest parts of the Church of England parish church of Saint John the Baptist are the nave and the arcade of the north aisle, both of which were built late in the 12th century. They are in the transitional style between Norman and Early English. In the 13th century the nave and north aisle were extended westwards by the addition of a fourth bay. In the 14th century a clerestory and a two-bay south aisle were added to the nave and most of the doors and windows were remodelled. Also in the 14th century the interior was decorated with wall paintings including a Pietà, a Saint George and a Doom. The bell tower was built around 1400 and the present Perpendicular Gothic east window of the chancel was added in the 15th century. Many of the wall paintings were painted over with limewash after the English Civil War.

The tower has a ring of five bells, all cast by Henry III Bagley of Chacombe in 1741. They are currently unringable because the fourth bell is cracked. St. John's is now one of eight ecclesiastical parishes in the Ironstone Benefice. Non-conformist groups in Hornton included Baptists in the 17th century and Quakers in the 17th and 18th centuries. Hornton had a Primitive Methodist congregation by 1836, which had built its own chapel by 1842. Hornton's present Methodist church was built in 1884.

== Social and economic history ==
Many of Hornton's houses and cottages date from the Great Rebuilding of England (about 1580–1640). Characteristically they are built of local Hornton ironstone and have thatched roofs. They include the manor house, whose date stone records that it was built in 1607. The open field system of farming predominated in the parish until the common lands were enclosed in 1766. The enclosure included allocating some land from which the rent would maintain a schoolmaster for the village. A legal dispute with the occupier prevented the parish from obtaining this income until 1800, but by 1815 the village had a free school teaching more than 50 children. In 1833 this was superseded by the building of a new National School for the village. In 1882 the school was enlarged and became a Church of England school, but in 1912 it was burnt down. A new County Council elementary school was opened in 1914.

In 1783 the village had two public houses: the Red Lion and the Crown. These were joined by the Buck by 1786 and the Bull by 1806. The only pub currently trading is the Dun Cow. The village was struck by an F0/T1 tornado on 23 November 1981, as part of the record-breaking nationwide tornado outbreak on that day.

== Amenities ==
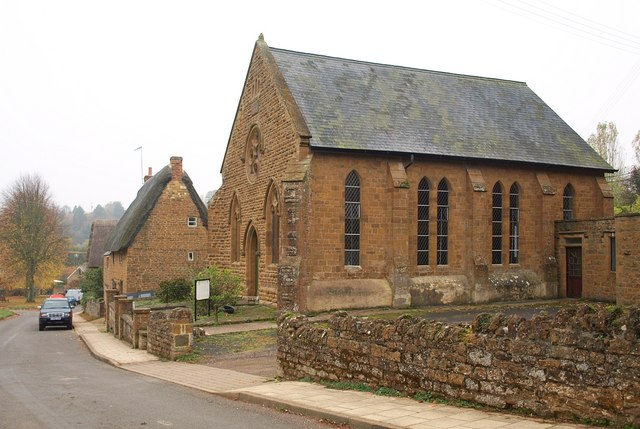
Hornton Methodist church

The school continues to serve the village as Hornton Primary School. The Red Lion is now called the Dun Cow. There is a Hornton and District Women's Institute. Hornton United Football Club plays in Banbury District and Lord Jersey Football Association Premier Division.

== Sources ==
- Lobel, Mary D; Crossley, Alan, eds. (1969). A History of the County of Oxford: Volume 9. Victoria County History.
- Sherwood, Jennifer; Pevsner, Nikolaus (1974). Oxfordshire. The Buildings of England. Harmondsworth: Penguin Books. ISBN 0-14-071045-0.
- Walker, George Graham (1975). Churches of the Banbury Area. Kineton: Roundwood Press. ISBN 0-900093-52-8.
