= New Marston Meadows =

Protected area in Oxfordshire, England

Coordinates: 51.765°N 1.248°W

- Site of Special Scientific Interest
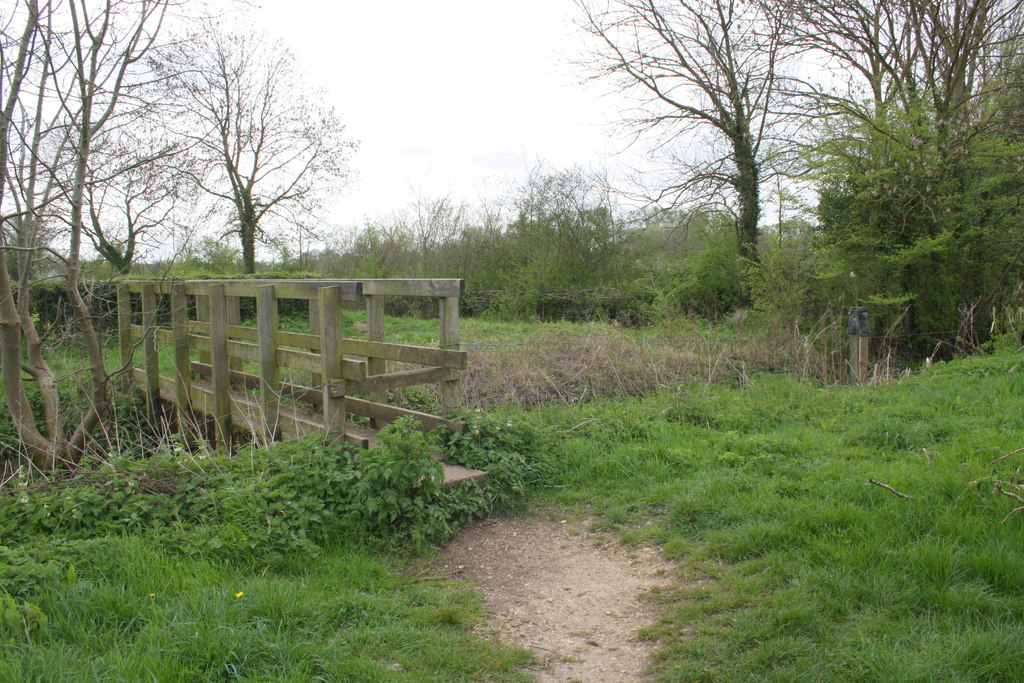
- Location of New Marston Meadows.
- Area of search: Oxfordshire
- Grid reference: SP 520 076
- Interest: Biological
- Area: 44.7 hectares (110 acres)
- Notification date: 1993
- Location map: Magic Map

New Marston Meadows is a 44.7-hectare (110-acre) biological Site of Special Scientific Interest in Oxford in Oxfordshire.

These meadows in the floodplain of the River Cherwell are traditionally managed for hay or by grazing. Some plants are typical of those on ancient meadows, such as common meadow-rue, pepper-saxifrage, devil's-bit scabious, adder's-tongue fern, smooth brome and meadow barley. Snake's head fritillary, which is nationally scarce, is also found at the site.
