= Benjamin Hope =

British artist, based in London (born 1976)

- Born: 1976 (age 49–50)
- Education: University of Warwick; Cambridge University
- Known for: Painter
- Website: www.benjaminhope.net

Benjamin Hope (born 1976) is a British artist, based in London.

== Life ==
He grew up in Oxford, the son of the painter Jane Hope and an academic historian (two of his grandparents were also artists).

After studying Mathematics and Physics at the University of Warwick and taking Part III of the Mathematical Tripos at Cambridge University, he was awarded a PhD in theoretical nanoscience at Cambridge. He has been a competitive runner and earned four Cambridge Blues for cross-country.

Hope was invited to join the Oxford Art Society in 1999, and in 2001 his still-life Old Violin won the Oxford Times Critics' Choice at the society's Members' Exhibition. In 2002, for its 400th anniversary, the Bodleian Library commissioned a commemorative still-life.

On leaving academia in 2007, he worked as a risk analyst in the City of London in order to earn enough to start painting professionally. In 2011, he left the City to paint full-time from his studio in Blackheath, South East London.

== Work ==
The Village from Cresswell Park

Working mainly in oil, but also in charcoal, pastel, and pencil, his works include plein air street scenes, detailed still lifes, and impressionistic portraits. The street scenes are mainly of locations in central and south London, while he has also painted landscapes beyond the capital. John Walsh in The Independent called him "a brilliantly accomplished impressionistic painter of street scenes."

His work has been selected for a number of exhibitions, including the Royal Academy Summer Exhibition in 2013. His first solo show, Observations was staged by the JP Art Gallery in London in 2015. A joint exhibition with sculptor Ben Hooper was held at the Gallery Different in Fitzrovia in June 2017. Since 2018 he has regularly exhibited at Island Fine Arts in Chichester.

In 2018 he was elected to The Pastel Society and the New English Art Club. In 2021 he was elected to membership of the Royal Society of Portrait Painters.

== Awards and recognition ==
Hope has won a number of prizes and awards:

- Sheng Xinyu Art Award at the Almenara Art Prize (2024)
- Shortlisted / Runner Up, Ondaatje / William Lock Portrait Prize, Royal Society of Portrait Painters Exhibition (2024)
- Menena Joy Schwabe Memorial Award, Royal Institute of Oil Painters Exhibition (2022)
- Sea Pictures Gallery Award, Royal Society of Marine Artists Exhibition (2022)
- Peter Kelly Commemorative Prize, Royal Society of British Artists Exhibition (2022)
- Michael Harding Award, Royal Society of British Artists Exhibition (2019)
- Frinton Frames Award, Royal Society of British Artists Exhibition (2018)
- Winsor & Newton Non-member Award, Royal Institute of Oil Painters Exhibition (2017)
- First Prize in the Jackson's Pastel Portrait Competition (2016)
- Jackson's Pastel Portrait Competition, First Prize (2016)
- New English Art Club: Mall Galleries Greetings Card Award (2016)
- Pintar Rapido First Prize (2014)
- Jackson's Prize, United Society of Artists Open Exhibition (2014)

His work has been selected for exhibition in

- Royal Academy Summer Exhibition, 2013
- New English Art Club
- The Pastel Society
- Royal Institute of Oil Painters
- Royal Society of British Artists
- Royal Society of Marine Artists
- Royal Society of Portrait Painters.
