= Marston, Oxford =

Village in Oxfordshire, England

Coordinates: 51.777°N 1.236°W

Marston
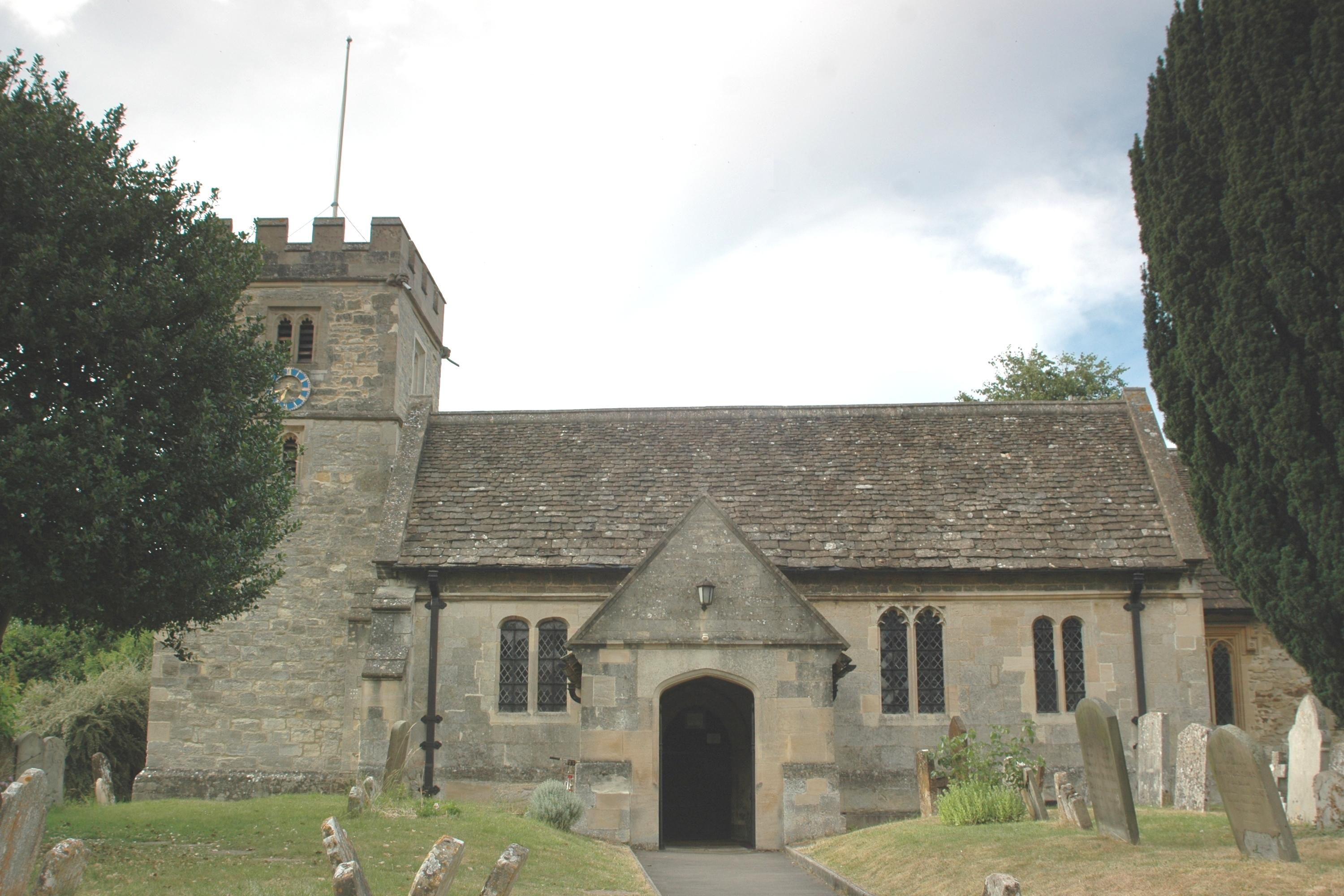
- St. Nicholas' parish church

- Location within Oxfordshire
- Area: 2.92 km^{2} (1.13 sq mi)
- Population: 3,398 (parish) (2011 census)
  - Density: 1,164/km^{2} (3,010/sq mi)
- OS grid reference: SP5208
- Civil parish: Old Marston
- District: Oxford
- Shire county: Oxfordshire
- Region: South East
- Country: England
- Sovereign state: United Kingdom
- Post town: Oxford
- Postcode district: OX3
- Dialling code: 01865
- Police: Thames Valley
- Fire: Oxfordshire
- Ambulance: South Central
- UK Parliament: Oxford East
- Website: Old Marston Parish Council

Marston is a village in the civil parish of Old Marston about 2 miles (3 km) northeast of the centre of Oxford, England. It was absorbed within the city boundaries in 1991. It is commonly called Old Marston to distinguish it from the suburb of New Marston that developed between St. Clement's and the village in the 19th and 20th centuries. The A40 Northern Bypass, part of the Oxford Ring Road forms a long north-west boundary of the village and parish and a limb, namely a distributary, of the Cherwell forms the western boundary.

== History ==
The toponym is said to come from "Marsh-town", because of the low-lying nature of the land, still green space, near the River Cherwell, which remains part of the wider Oxford floodplain and is still subject to periodic flooding. The parish used to be part of the manor of Headington. The village played an important part in the Civil War, during the siege of Oxford. While the Royalist forces were besieged in the city, which had been used by King Charles I as his capital, the Parliamentary forces under Sir Thomas Fairfax had quarters in Marston, and used the church tower as a lookout post for viewing the enemy's artillery positions in what is now the University Parks. Oliver Cromwell visited Fairfax at Manor House, which is now known as "Cromwell House" at 17 Mill Lane, and "Manor House" at 15 Mill Lane, and the Treaty for the Surrender of Oxford was signed there in 1646.

In the 20th-century expansion of Oxford, new housing followed the Marston Road from St Clement's towards Marston, which was soon absorbed by the city. New Marston became a separate parish in the 1950s. Old Marston parish become part of the City of Oxford in 1991. It retains its (civil) parish council. Marston has had a number of notable residents, including members of the Oxford penicillin team: Howard Florey and his second wife Margaret Jennings, and Norman Heatley. The village has been associated with the origin of the Jack Russell breed of terrier.

=== Church of St Nicholas ===
The parish church is dedicated to Saint Nicholas. It began as a chapel, first mentioned in a charter of 1122 by which it was granted to the Augustinians canons of St Frideswide's Priory. The building dates from the 12th century, and has substantial additions in the 15th century. It is a Grade I listed building.

== Amenities ==
A cycle route links Marston with central Oxford via the meadows west of New Marston, over three bridges bridge on the River Cherwell, past Parson's Pleasure and along the southern boundary of The Parks to the junction of South Parks Road and St Cross Road near the Science Area of Oxford University. It is also possible to walk on footpaths across the meadows to the Parks, either via Mesopotamia Walk or Rainbow Bridge.

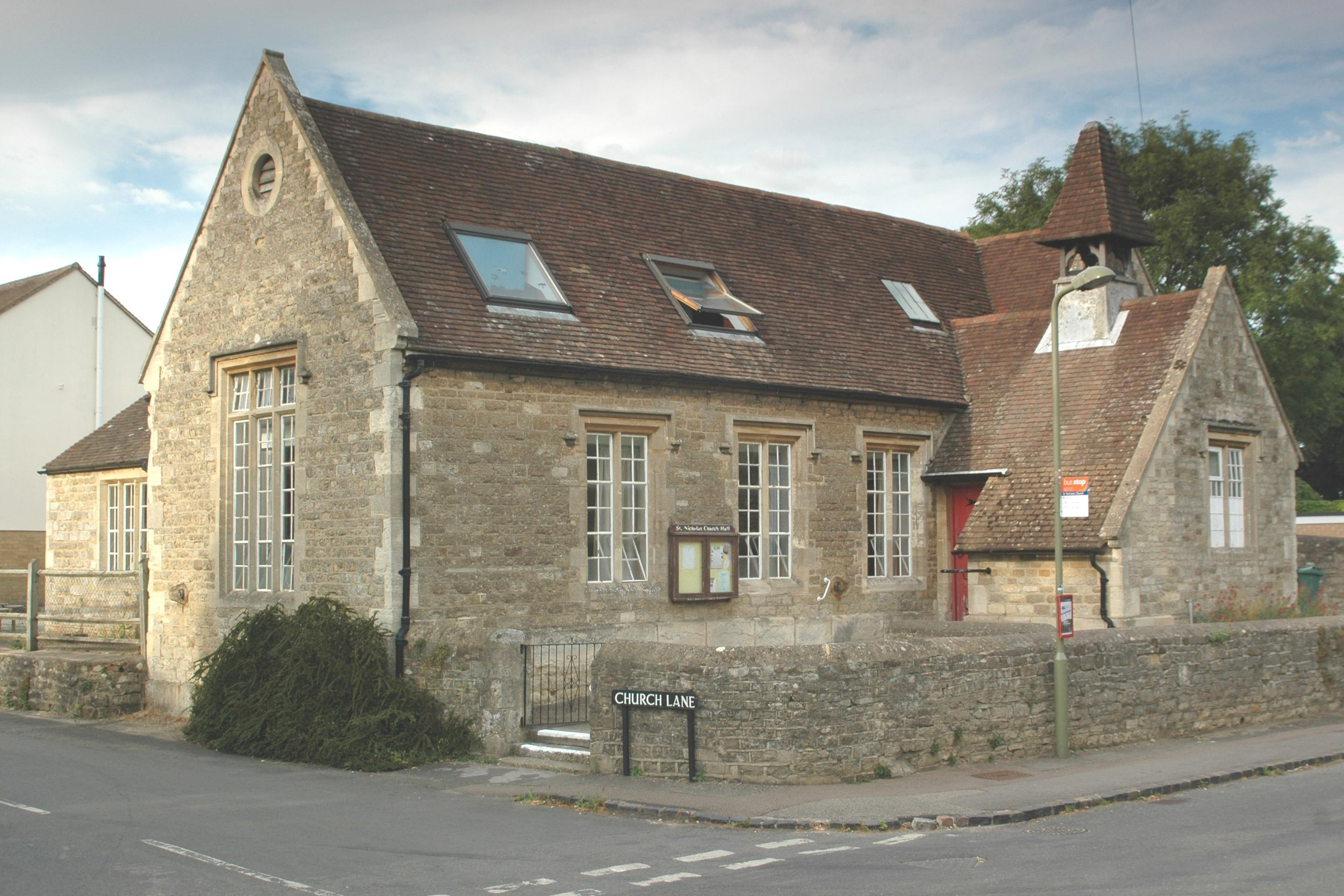
St Nicholas' church hall, formerly the parish school.

== See also ==
- Victoria Arms, Marston

== Sources ==
- Lobel, Mary D, ed. (1957). A History of the County of Oxford: Volume 5: Bullingdon Hundred. Victoria County History. pp. 214–221.
- Sherwood, Jennifer; Pevsner, Nikolaus (1974). Oxfordshire. The Buildings of England. Harmondsworth: Penguin Books. pp. 699–700. ISBN 0-14-071045-0.
