= Gutch =

Gutch may refer to:

== People ==
- Eliza Gutch (1840-1931), English author.
- George Gutch, British architect.
- John Gutch (clergyman) (1746–1831), Anglican clergyman and official of the University of Oxford.
- John Gutch (colonial administrator), British colonial administrator.
- John Mathew Gutch (1776-1861), English journalist and historian.
- John Wheeley Gough Gutch (1809–1862), British surgeon and editor.

== Other ==
- Gutch Common, Site of Special Scientific Interest in Wiltshire, England.

== See also ==
- Gutch (surname)
