= John Gutch =

John Gutch may refer to:

- John Gutch (clergyman) (1746–1831), English Anglican clergyman and official of the University of Oxford
- John Mathew Gutch (1776–1861), English journalist and historian
- John Wheeley Gough Gutch (1809–1862), British surgeon and editor
- John Gutch (colonial administrator) (1905–1988), British colonial administrator who served as High Commissioner for the Western Pacific and Governor of the Solomon Islands
