= Isaac Hugh Russell =

- Born: between 1779 and 1781
- Died: 19 May 1849 (age 66-68); Oxford, England
- Occupations: Botanical artist and glass painter
- Spouse: Ann
- Children: 2

Isaac Hugh Russell was a glass painter by trade, but is best known for his botanical illustration of W. Baxter's British Phaenogamous Botany . He lived and worked in the Oxford area in the early 19th century.

== Early life ==
Little is known of Russell's early life other than that he was born around 1779 to 1781; the 1841 Census puts his place of birth outside England and Wales.

Russell was based in Caroline Street, St Clement's from as early as 1828 until his death in 1849. The area was popular with tradespeople and craftsmen as its location just outside the City of Oxford until 1836 meant that it was beyond the scope of the City's higher rates (property taxes), rents and more restrictive trading regulations.

== Work ==
In the 1830s, Russell was one of two local artists approached by William Baxter, Curator of the nearby University of Oxford Botanic Garden to illustrate his British Phaenogamous Botany or Figures and Descriptions of the Genera of British Flowering Plants. (1834–43). Russell produced over 200 illustrations which were coloured by Baxter's daughter and are now widely reproduced as posters and prints..

As a glass painter, Russell's most significant known work is the east window of St Clement's Church, Oxford.

His son, Isaac, was also a glass artist.

== Death ==
Russell died on 19 May 1849 at St Georges Yard, St Clement's, Oxford. He was buried in St Clement's churchyard.
