= Gutch (surname) =

Gutch is a surname. Notable people by that name include:

- Eliza Gutch (1840–1931), English author.
- George Gutch, British architect.
- John Gutch (clergyman) (1746–1831), Anglican clergyman and official of the University of Oxford.
- John Gutch (colonial administrator), British colonial administrator.
- John Mathew Gutch (1776–1861), English journalist and historian.
- John Wheeley Gough Gutch (1809–1862), British surgeon and editor.
