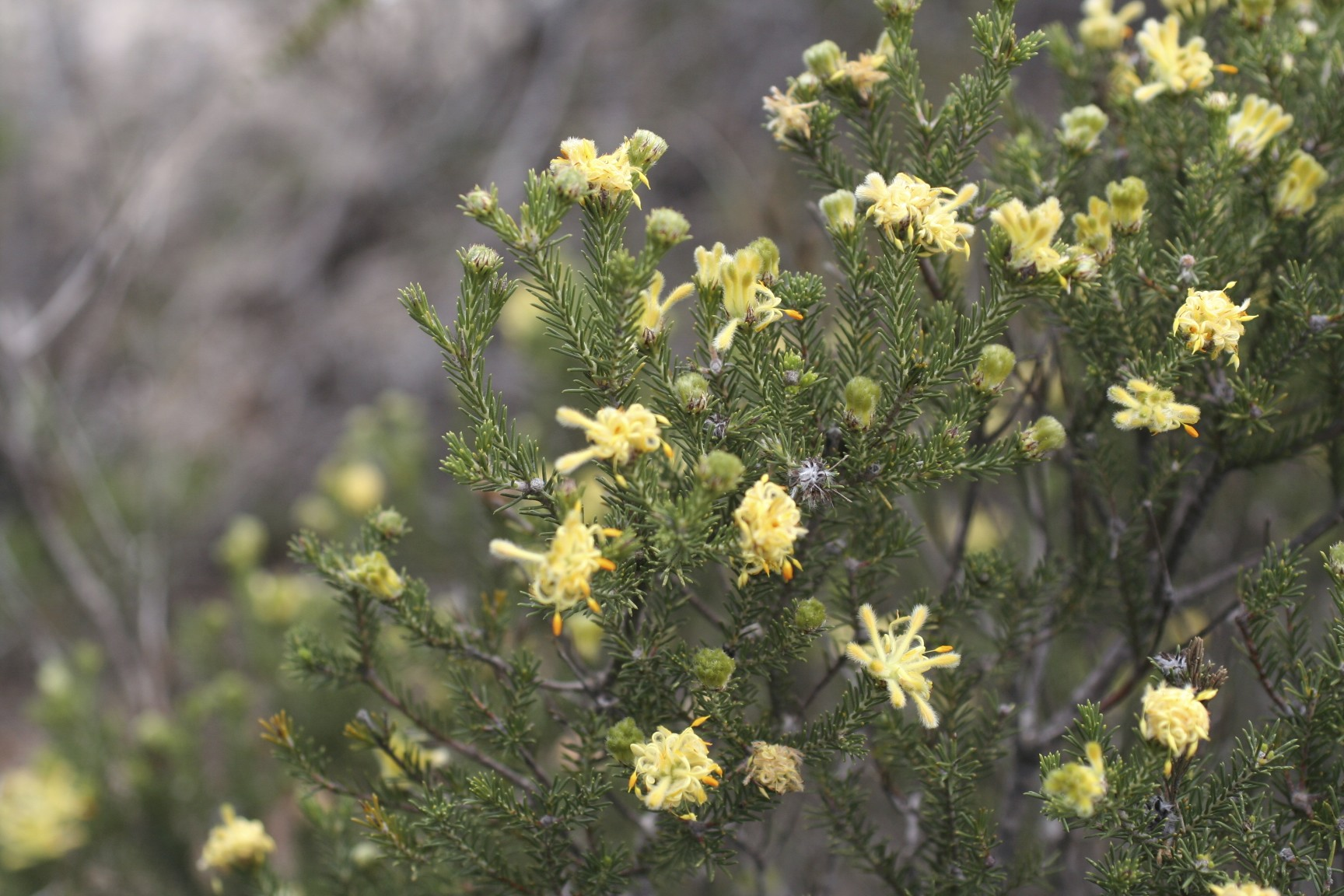
- Near Eurardy

Scientific classification
- Kingdom: Plantae
- Clade: Tracheophytes
- Clade: Angiosperms
- Clade: Eudicots
- Order: Proteales
- Family: Proteaceae
- Genus: Petrophile
- Species: P. ericifolia

Binomial name
- Petrophile ericifolia R.Br.

Synonyms
- Petrophila ericifolia R.Br. orth. var.; Petrophila ericifolia f. subglabra Domin orth. var.; Petrophile ericifolia f. subglabra Domin

= Petrophile ericifolia =

Species of shrub endemic to Western Australia

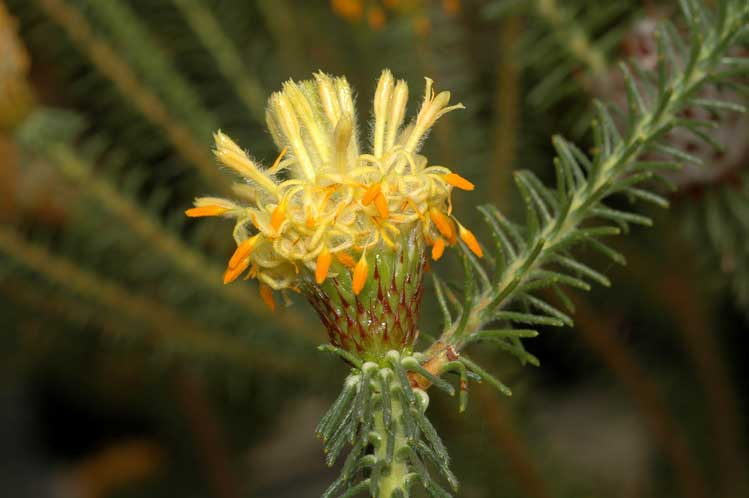
Flower detail, subsp. ericifolia

Petrophile ericifolia is a species of flowering plant in the family Proteaceae and is endemic to southwestern Western Australia. It is a shrub with cylindrical leaves, and oval to spherical heads of hairy, yellow flowers.

== Description ==
Petrophile ericifolia is a shrub that typically grows to a height of 0.3–1.5 m (1 ft 0 in – 4 ft 11 in) and has branchlets and leaves that are sometimes covered with curly hairs when young but that become glabrous with age. The leaves are cylindrical, up to 12 mm (0.47 in) long with a rough surface. The flowers are arranged on the ends of branchlets, in sessile, oval to spherical heads 10–20 mm (0.39–0.79 in) in diameter, with many egg-shaped, pointed involucral bracts at the base. The flowers are 10–20 mm (0.39–0.79 in) long, yellow and hairy. Flowering occurs from August to November and the fruit is a nut, fused with others in an oval head up to 20 mm (0.79 in) in diameter.

== Taxonomy ==
Petrophile ericifolia was first formally described in 1830 by Robert Brown in the Supplementum to his Prodromus Florae Novae Hollandiae et Insulae Van Diemen from material collected by William Baxter near King Georges Sound in 1829. The specific epithet (ericifolia) means "erica-leaved".

In 1995, Donald Bruce Foreman described two subspecies in Flora of Australia and the names are accepted by the Australian Plant Census:

- Petrophile ericifolia R.Br. subsp. ericifolia has more or less glabrous leaves up to 12 mm (0.47 in) long, flower heads 15–20 mm (0.59–0.79 in) in diameter and flowers up to 20 mm (0.79 in) long;
- Petrophile ericifolia subsp. subpubescens (Domin) Foreman has leaves up to 3–6 mm (0.12–0.24 in) long with a medium to sparse covering of short hairs, flower heads about 10 mm (0.39 in) in diameter and flowers 13–16 mm (0.51–0.63 in) long. Subspecies subpubescens was first formally described in 1923 by Karel Domin as Petrophile ericifolia f. subpubescens.

== Distribution and habitat ==
Subspecies ericifolia grows in heath and scrub from the Fitzgerald River National Park to the Stirling Range and inland to Wagin. Subspecies subpubescens grows in low shrubland mostly between Northam and Kellerberrin.

== Conservation status ==
Both subspecies of Petrophile ericifolia are classified as "not threatened" by the Western Australian Government Department of Parks and Wildlife.
