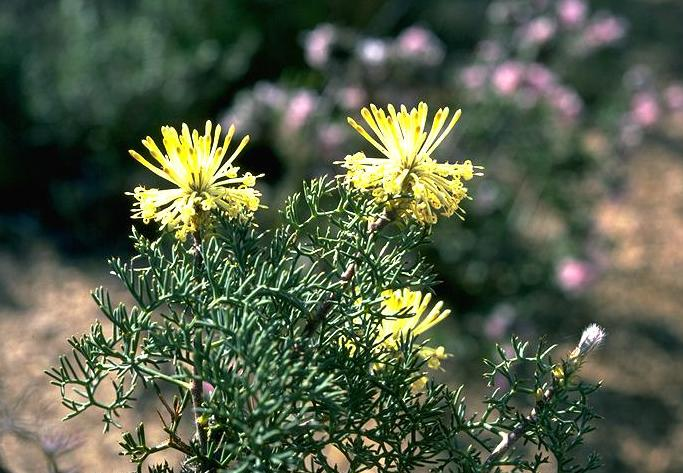
- In the Stirling Range

Scientific classification
- Kingdom: Plantae
- Clade: Tracheophytes
- Clade: Angiosperms
- Clade: Eudicots
- Order: Proteales
- Family: Proteaceae
- Genus: Petrophile
- Species: P. divaricata

Binomial name
- Petrophile divaricata R.Br.

Synonyms
- Petrophila divaricata R.Br.orth. var.; Petrophila intricata Lindl. orth. var.; Petrophila intricata Lindl.

= Petrophile divaricata =

Species of shrub endemic to Western Australia

Petrophile divaricata is a species of flowering plant in the family Proteaceae and is endemic to southwestern Western Australia. It is a shrub with bipinnate, sharply-pointed leaves, and oval to oblong heads of hairy, yellow flowers.

== Description ==
Petrophile divaricata is a shrub that typically grows to a height of 0.5–2 m (1 ft 8 in – 6 ft 7 in) and has branchlets and leaves that are covered with long, fine hairs when young but that become glabrous with age. The leaves are bipinnate, 40–110 mm (1.6–4.3 in) long on a petiole 20–50 mm (0.79–1.97 in) long, and pinnately-divided with rigid pinnae 6–20 mm (0.24–0.79 in) long, each with a sharply-pointed tip. The flowers are arranged on the ends of branchlets, in sessile, oval to oblong heads about 25 mm (0.98 in) long, with deciduous involucral bracts at the base. The flowers are 20–25 mm (0.79–0.98 in) long, yellow or pale yellow and hairy. Flowering occurs from August to December and the fruit is a nut, fused with others in an oval to cylindrical head up to 28 mm (1.1 in) long.

== Taxonomy ==
Petrophile divaricata was first formally described in 1830 by Robert Brown in the Supplementum to his Prodromus Florae Novae Hollandiae et Insulae Van Diemen from material collected by William Baxter near King Georges Sound in 1823. The specific epithet (divaricata) means "widely-spreading".

== Distribution and habitat ==
This petrophile grows in heath, forest and woodland between Eneabba, Albany and the Fitzgerald River National Park in the Avon Wheatbelt, Esperance Plains, Jarrah Forest, Mallee and Swan Coastal Plain biogeographical regions of southwestern Western Australia.

== Conservation status ==
Petrophile divaricata is classified as "not threatened" by the Western Australian Government Department of Parks and Wildlife.
