= Philip Ayres =

Philip Ayres may refer to:

- Philip Ayres (poet) (1638–1712), English poet
- Philip Burnard Ayres (1813–1863), British physician and botanist
- Philip James Ayres (1944–2021), Australian biographer
