= Petrophile crispata =

Scientific classification
- Kingdom: Plantae
- Clade: Tracheophytes
- Clade: Angiosperms
- Clade: Eudicots
- Order: Proteales
- Family: Proteaceae
- Genus: Petrophile
- Species: P. crispata

Binomial name
- Petrophile crispata R.Br.

Synonyms
- Petrophila crispata R.Br.orth. var.

Species of shrub endemic to Western Australia

Petrophile crispata is a species of flowering plant in the family Proteaceae and is endemic to southwestern Western Australia. It is a shrub with pinnately-divided leaves with sharply-pointed tips, and oval heads of glabrous, yellow flowers.

== Description ==
Petrophile crispata is a shrub that typically grows to a height of 0.5–1 m (1 ft 8 in – 3 ft 3 in) and has hairy branchlets that become glabrous with age. The leaves are 40–110 mm (1.6–4.3 in) long on a petiole 20–45 mm (0.79–1.77 in) long, and pinnately-divided with rigid pinnae 6–40 mm (0.24–1.57 in) long, each with a sharply-pointed tip. The flowers are arranged on the ends of branchlets, in sessile, oval heads up to 20 mm (0.79 in) long, with deciduous, egg-shaped involucral bracts at the base. The flowers are about 10 mm (0.39 in) long, yellow and glabrous. Flowering occurs from September to November and the fruit is a nut fused with others in an oval head 15–25 mm (0.59–0.98 in) long.

== Taxonomy ==
Petrophile crispata was first formally described in 1830 by Robert Brown in the Supplementum to his Prodromus Florae Novae Hollandiae et Insulae Van Diemen from material collected by William Baxter near King Georges Sound in 1829. The specific epithet (crispata) means "curled" or "crinkled", referring to the hairs on the branchlets.

== Distribution and habitat ==
This petrophile grows in shrubland and woodland between Cranbrook, Cheyne Bay near Cape Riche and Woodanilling in the Avon Wheatbelt, Esperance Plains, Jarrah Forest and Mallee biogeographical regions of southwestern Western Australia.

== Conservation status ==
Petrophile crispata is classified as "not threatened" by the Western Australian Government Department of Parks and Wildlife.
