= St Clement's Church, Oxford =

Evangelical church in Oxford, England

Coordinates: 51°45′12″N 1°14′16″W

St Clement's
- St Clement's Parish Church
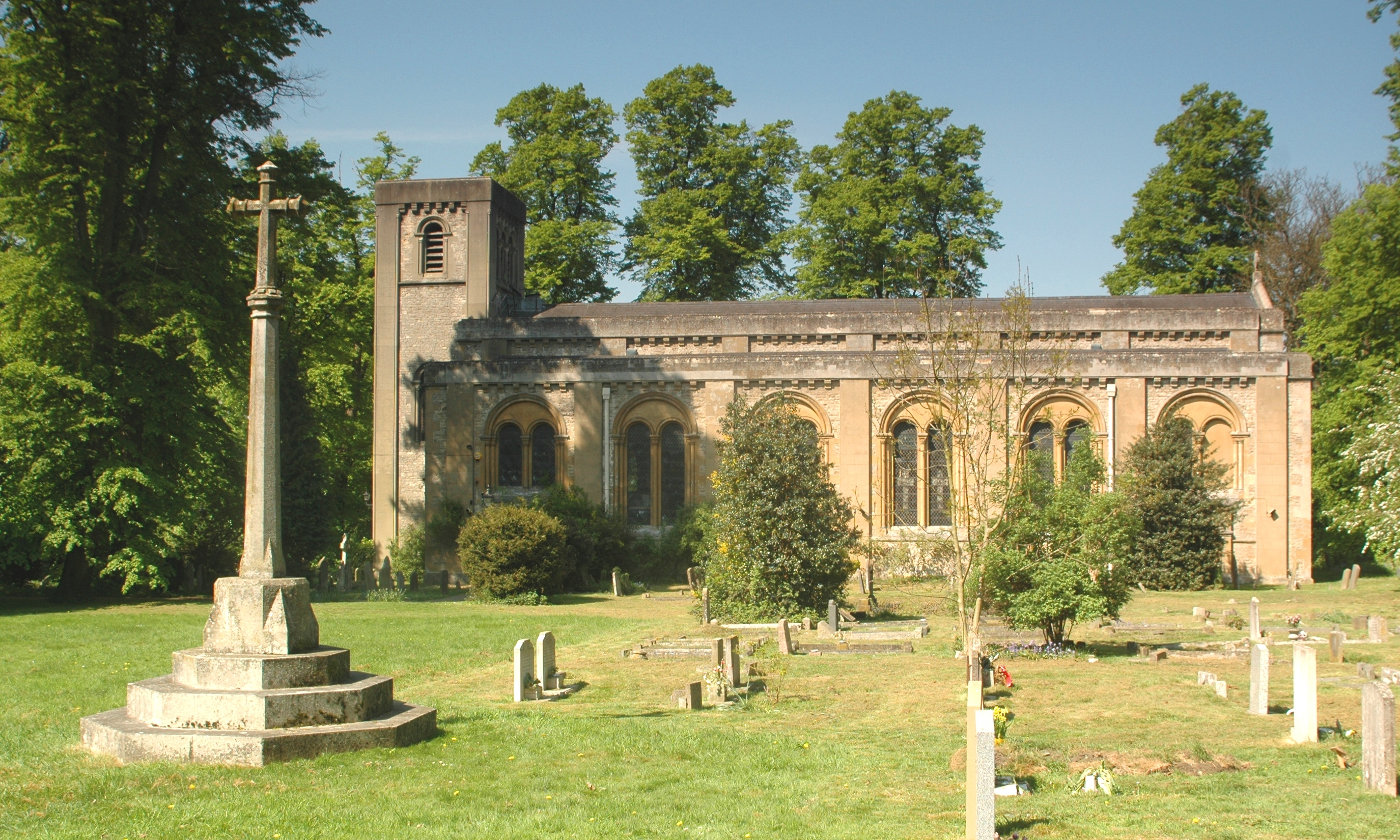
- The present church, completed in 1828, viewed from the east
- St Clement's
- OS grid reference: SP 52706 06330
- Location: Marston Road, Oxford OX4 1FN
- Country: England
- Denomination: Church of England
- Churchmanship: Evangelical
- Website: www.stclements.org.uk

History
- Founded: Before 1122
- Dedication: Clement, Bishop of Rome (died c.100 AD)

Architecture
- Architect: Daniel Robertson
- Style: Romanesque Revival (Anglo Norman)
- Years built: 1825–1828

Administration
- Province: Province of Canterbury
- Diocese: Diocese of Oxford
- Archdeaconry: Oxford
- Deanery: Cowley

Clergy
- Rector: Revd Mark Hay

St Clement's Church is an evangelical Church of England parish church situated just to the east of central Oxford, England.

== History ==
The present church dates from the 1820s, but replaced a much older building, which was demolished in 1829.

=== The old church ===
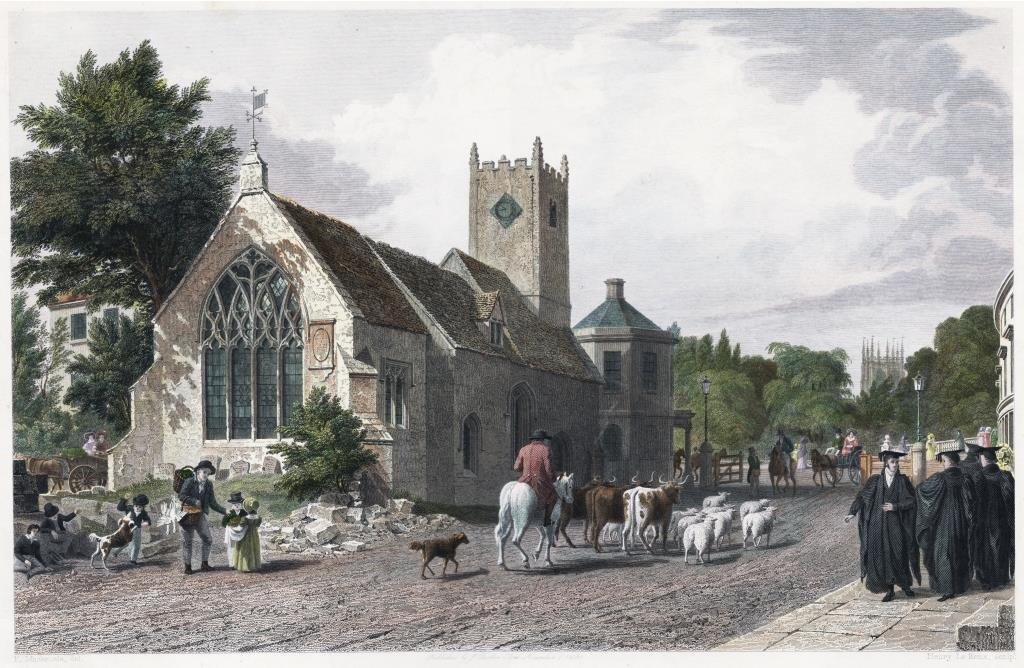
St Clement's Old Church, Oxford c. 1828 (Le Keux)

St Clement's Church originally stood at what is now The Plain roundabout, where the roads from London and Henley cross the River Cherwell at Magdalen Bridge. It served both the small community of Bruggeset ("Bridge Settlement") that surrounded it as well as the largely rural area that eventually became East Oxford.

The first written record mentioning the church was in 1122 when it was one of the royal chapels given to St Frideswide's Priory by King Henry I. One scholar suggests that there is a circumstantial case for the church being built in connection with a Danish garrison sometime between 1016 and the 1050s; this would explain its location close to a bridge and the dedication to St Clement which was unusual at inland sites at this time.

Almost nothing is known of the appearance of the earliest church building, but recent scholarship suggests that a stone head now in the Ashmolean Museum may have originally been a brightly painted stone corbel from the 13th century church, suggesting that the earliest parishioners would have worshipped in a space rich in colour and carved stonework.

In 1323, money was granted for the rebuilding of "the Church of St Clement beyond Petty Pont" (Magdalen Bridge) Most of the building demolished in 1829 dated from this time.

John Peshall, writing in 1773 describes a church "composed of one isle thirteen yards long (exclusive of a chancel) and six yards and twenty inches broad. On the north-east and west side are galleries. Over the latter is a small capp’d tiled tower containing three bells".

The churchyard was extended in 1781.

The capped tower was replaced by a square one in 1816. John Henry Newman added a gallery to accommodate a new Sunday school in 1825, with Newman's friend Edward Pusey providing a stove for the children.

=== Civil War ===
An extract from St Clement's parish register for 1643 (OS) records "Capt. Slade, shot to death buried 12th Sept." and "Jan (9) Francis Cole executed for a spie & buried beside ye church privately without any ceremonie". During the Siege of Oxford (1644–1646) the church and parish were literally on the front line between the Parliamentary forces on Headington Hill and the Royalists in the city. It was reported that, as a consequence, "no parish suffered more severely" with whole streets being demolished to facilitate the building of fortifications or to prevent the enemy from taking cover. The 17th century Black Horse Inn and the church were among the few buildings to survive.

=== Growth and change ===
In the early 1800s, slum clearances in Oxford saw St Clement's expand rapidly, with over three hundred new "houses being built between 1821 and 1824". The old church was small, seating 250, and services were "… very much interrupted and annoyed by the continued noise of carriages passing to and fro …", so a plan was formed to build a new church on a new site to accommodate the growing population.

As the then rector, Revd John Gutch, was in his 80s, the decision was made to appoint a curate to assist him and to raise money for the new church.

John Henry Newman, later Cardinal Newman and then St John Henry Newman, became curate in 1824. Although he was only at St Clement's for two years, Newman had an enormous impact on the parish, becoming widely respected as "a proper minister". He visited every home in the parish, started a Sunday school and preached regularly to a packed church.

=== The new church ===
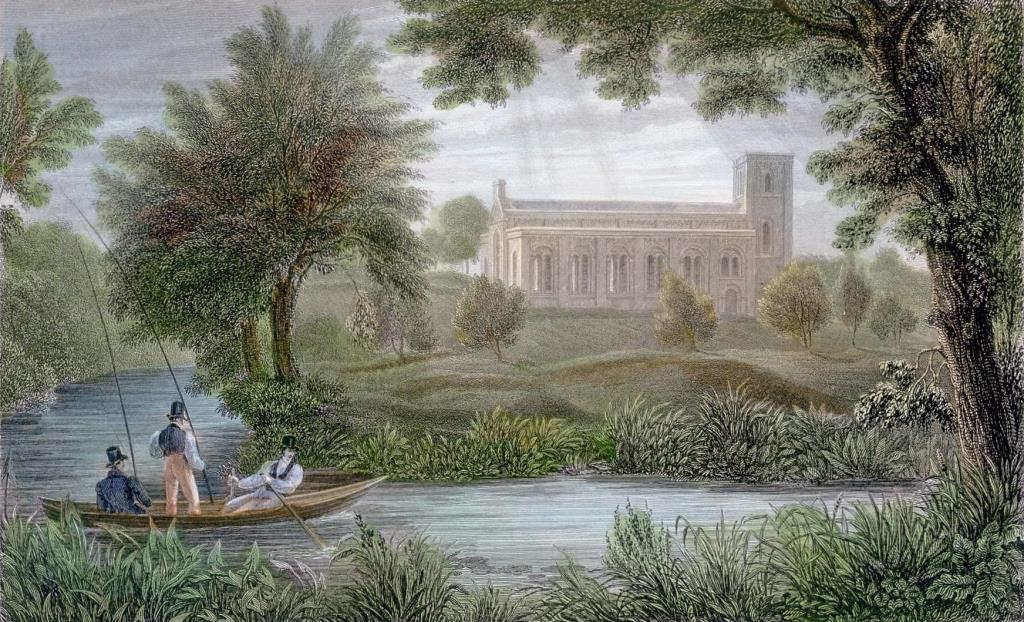
St Clement's New Church, Oxford c.1834, (Le Keux)

Thanks to Newman's fundraising, the present church was constructed in 1825–28. It was built by John Hudson of Oxford at a cost of £6,032 19s 5d on land in Hacklingcroft Meadow, given by Sir Joseph Lock (1760–1844), a local banker and goldsmith. The church had originally invited designs along the lines of Salisbury Cathedral or a Grecian temple but settled on an Anglo-Norman design on the grounds of cost.

The architect was Daniel Robertson, who went on to design the Clarendon Press buildings in Walton Street. St Clement's is an early example of the Anglo-Norman or Romanesque Revival style, although Pevsner describes it as "patently Georgian Norman". The architect estimated that the new church could seat up to 1024 people.

The site was chosen in the expectation that new housing would expand along Marston Lane (now Marston Road). The original plan would have placed the church on Marston Lane, but it was moved to its current position as part of a revised plan, subsequently abandoned, to build streets and houses in the form of a square.

=== Legality of marriages in the new church ===
St Clement's was the first church in Oxford to be built on a new site since the Middle Ages. An unforeseen consequence of the new location was that it did not automatically become the parish church when it was consecrated in 1828. Unfortunately, this was not realised at the time, necessitating a special Act of Parliament in 1836 to ensure the legality of all the marriages that had taken place in the new church.

=== Development of the church building 19th-21st centuries ===
The interior underwent a major refurbishment in the 1870s. In 1871 the original Georgian box-pews and benches were replaced by the present ‘Neo-Norman’ pews, arranged in four blocks divided by a newly tiled nave and two newly positioned side aisles. The West Gallery was taken down in 1876. The refurbishments were the work of Edward George Bruton (1826–1899), an Oxford-based architect who specialised in ecclesiastical commissions in Oxfordshire and Buckinghamshire and were largely paid for by members of the wealthy Morrell brewing family of Headington Hill Hall. The Morrells were closely associated with St Clement's for much of the 19th and early 20th centuries and were significant benefactors to the church and parish.

The late 20th and early 21st centuries saw several reordering exercises in the church building including the creation of a crèche and kitchen (1973), creating a dais in the chancel area (1984) and the installation of disabled access (2005).

In 2020-22 the organ and several pews were removed to create a more flexible space and the kitchen was upgraded to allow for the preparation of hot food.

== The present ==
The current congregation is drawn from all around the Oxford area and reflects a wide diversity of ages and backgrounds.

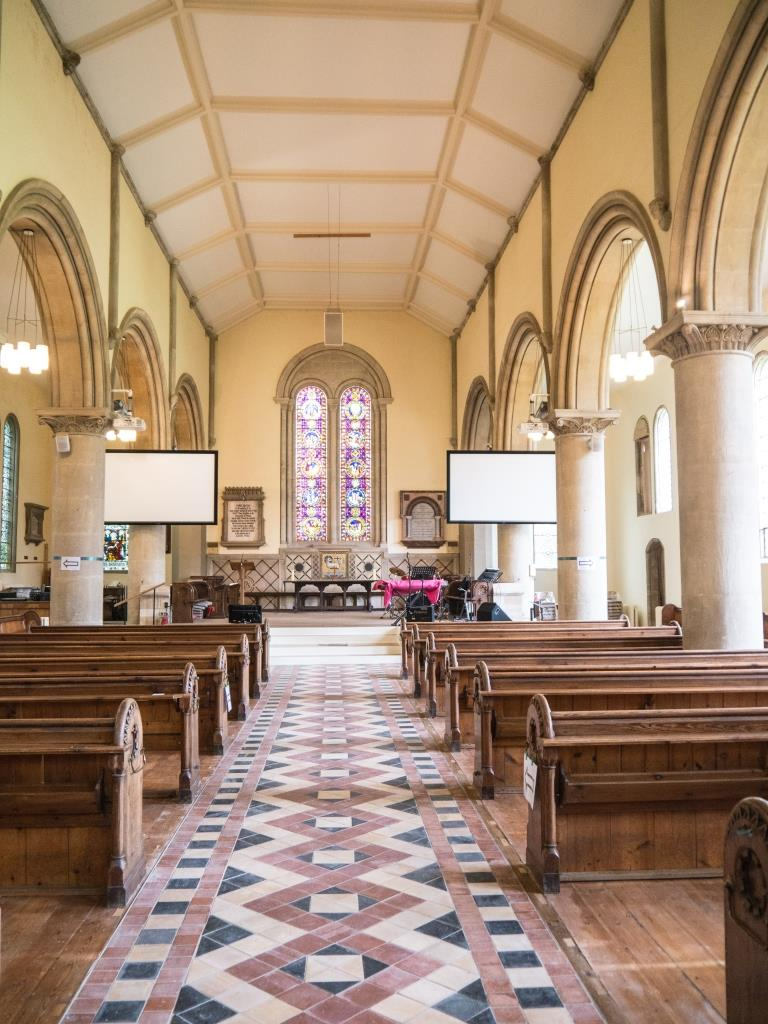
Church interior looking down the central aisle

In addition to the church building, many church and community activities take place at St Clement's Centre on Cross Street.

St Clement's normally holds Sunday services at 10:30 and 18:30 with children and young people either attending the morning service with their families or having their own activities nearby. Mid-week activities include:

- Home groups
- Youth activities
- A popular Baby and Toddler Group
- Café Club - for older people and others who are around during the day

St Clement's is a partner church in the Oxford Churches Debt Centre.

The church's professional staff consists of the Rector, Revd Mark Hay (from April 2024), a Parish Administration Manager, a Youth Worker, and a Children and Families Worker. There is a Leadership Team and many day-to-day activities are supported or led by a body of active volunteers.

== Bells ==
St Clement's has three bells, all brought from the old church in the 1820s. The two larger bells were later removed from the tower and are now on display in the church entrance.

- The largest bell is 21½ inches (55.6 cm) in diameter and was made at the Woodstock foundry. The inscription reads RICHARD SHVRLY ROBERT GRIFFIN C W 1636
- The second bell is 20½ inches (52 cm) in diameter. Based on its shape, it has been identified as dating from the late 13th century making it the oldest bell in Oxford
- The small suance bell is the only one still in the tower, although it is not rung. It was made by Edward Hemins at his foundry in Bicester. The inscription reads: + W: HACKINS. E:HARRIS CHURCH-WARDENS E: HEMINS. BISSITER. FECIT. 1731

== Music ==
The first professional musician mentioned in the church records is a Mr H Pitts who was appointed as clarinetist in 1843 at an annual salary of £3 3s; the clarinet cost £3 15s.

St Clement's first organ was purchased at a cost of about £200 in 1846 and installed in the west gallery. In 1876 it was moved to the south-east corner of the church next to the chancel when the gallery was demolished.

In 1897-99 a new organ was built by Messrs Martin & Coate of 54-55 Pembroke Street, St Clement's (now Rectory Road) from a specification drawn up by Dr TW Dodd, the organist, who was also organist of The Queen's College. The old organ was sold to St Paul's Church, Walton Street, Oxford (now Freud's nightclub). The new organ was first used at the special service for Queen Victoria's Diamond Jubilee in 1897. An electric blower was installed in 1931 and the organ was rebuilt in 1952 by Nicholson's of Worcester who also installed a modern detached console. The cost of maintenance and changes in worship styles since the late 20th century led to the organ falling into disuse and it was removed in early 2020 by Michael Farley of Sidmouth. In 2025 many of the flue pipes were installed at the Basilica of St Dominic in Valletta, Malta.

Since the late 20th century, music for worship has been increasingly provided by a worship group using a range of traditional and electronic instruments. This has been accompanied by the increased use of contemporary worship songs alongside traditional hymns.

During the pandemic of 2020–21, when public worship, including singing and music, was curtailed, St Clement's musicians responded by recording music in their homes for use during online services.

== Windows ==
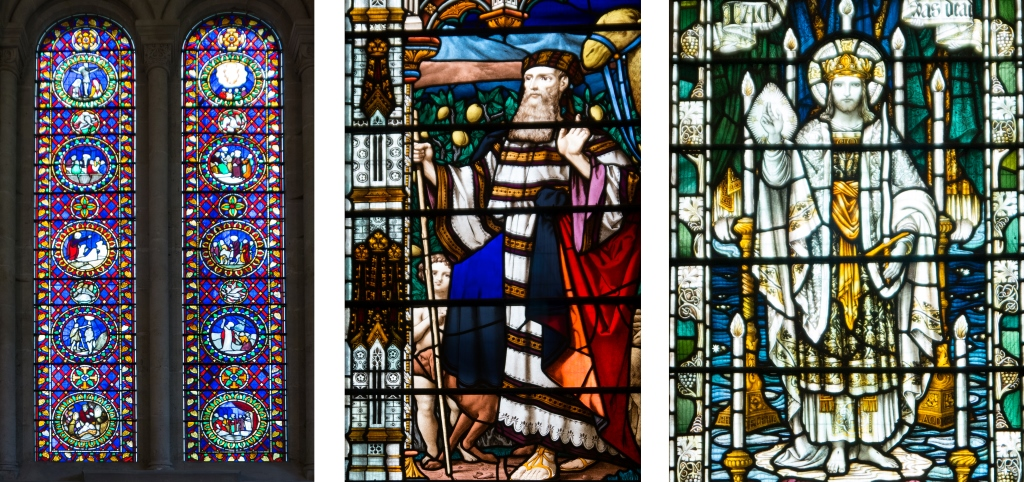
East window, "In Faith Obey" window, "Seven Churches" window (left to right)

The striking east window (geographical north) at the front of the church shows ten scenes from the life of Christ. It is made of painted glass and is the work of Isaac Hugh Russell, a "poor but talented" artist who lived and worked in Caroline Street, St Clement's. It was commissioned in 1846 and installed in 1847.

The four north windows (geographical west) depict scenes on the theme of faith. They were made in memory of James Morrell the Younger (1810–1863) by A and WH O’Connor for St Martin's Church, Carfax in 1865 and moved to St Clement's in 1896, when St Martin's was demolished.

The "Seven Churches" window in the north-west corner of the church was given by Emily Alicia Morrell of Headington Hill Hall in memory of her late husband, George Herbert Morrell, MP (1845–1906). It is based on Christ's letters to the Seven Churches of Asia in Revelation (1:12–3:22). The subject is unusual, and suggests a deliberate choice by Mrs Morrell of a Bible passage of particular relevance to her or her family. The window is of painted glass and was installed in 1908. It was designed by Powell & Sons of Whitefriars Glassworks, London. Powell was closely associated with William Morris and the Arts and Crafts movement. This influence is clearly apparent from features such as the use of red wings for angels.

The south windows (geographical east) are plain glass.

In 2018-21 St Clement's undertook a major project to clean and repair the windows, including the restoration of the "In Faith Love" window featuring Mary of Bethany, which had been partially dismantled when the Crèche Room was built in the 1980s and the restoration of one of the south windows which had previously been blocked off to prevent the organ becoming damp.

== Churchyard ==
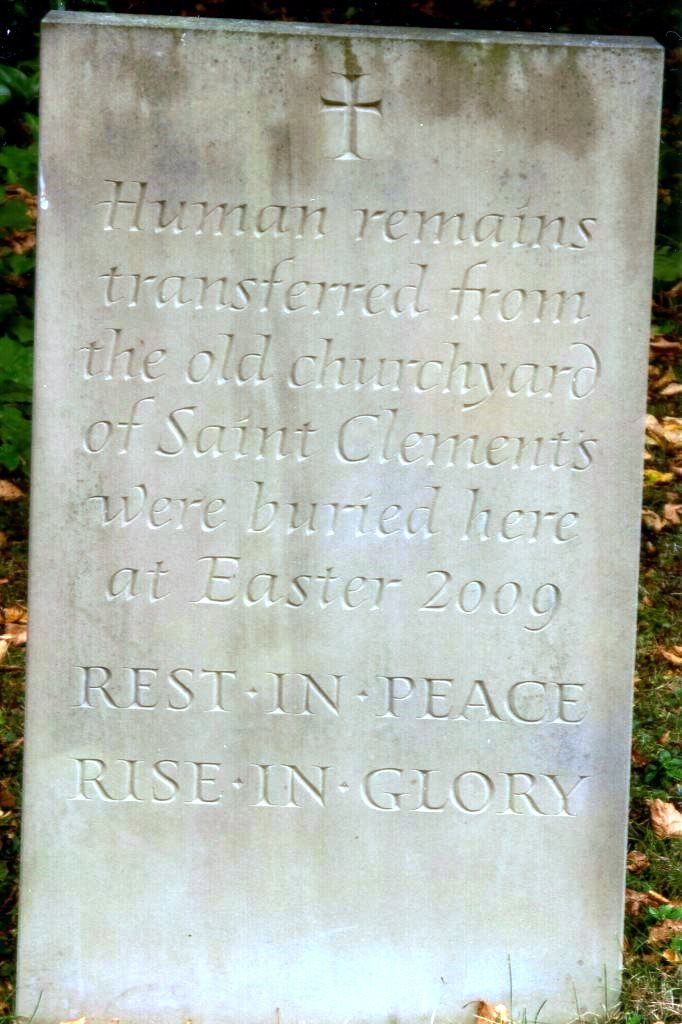
Stone marking reburial site of human remains from the Old Churchyard, Easter 2009

At the new church, the original churchyard was a small area immediately around the church building. In 1879 the Morrell family gave the church 22 perches (about 665 sq. yards or 556 sq. m.) of land to extend the churchyard to the west. The Morrells donated a further acre (0.4 h.) in 1920 and this now forms the main part of the churchyard between the church building and the Marston Road. The 1920 extension was partly to provide a setting for a war memorial; The memorial was erected by Messrs WH Axtell and Son and was dedicated on 4 April 1921. A memorial scroll inside the church lists the names of St Clement's men who died during the First World War.

The old churchyard at The Plain remained in use until the 1870s and was taken over by the City Council in 1939. The remaining memorials were moved to the top of the present churchyard in 1950. Human remains from the old churchyard which were disturbed by roadworks at The Plain and which could not be reburied at the original site were respectfully reinterred in the new churchyard in 1949 and 2009.

The planting scheme of limes along the drive continues into Headington Hill Park where they line the carriage road up to Headington Hill Hall. The last Mrs Morrell to live at Headington Hill Hall drove to church in a pony carriage as recently as the 1960s.

St Clement's sits in a "green corridor" that runs from St Cross Cemetery in the east to Warneford Lane in the west. The churchyard is gradually being developed as a peaceful haven for visitors and a rich habitat for wildlife - woodpeckers, jays, robins and even deer are frequent visitors.

== Charities ==
St Clement's Church has links to two charities, both of which are chaired ex-officio by the Rector.

=== The Charity of Thomas Dawson ===
The Charity of Thomas Dawson (est. 1521), also referred to as "The Dawson Trust" or "Dawson's Charity" owns property in St Clement's the nett profits of which are used for charitable purposes. The charity helps to relieve poverty through direct gifts targeted on those living in the Parish of St Clement and education support to those residing in or organisations delivering educational support within Oxford (post codes OX1-OX4). It also contributes to the maintenance of the fabric and services of St Clement's Church.

In 2024 the Charity of Thomas Dawson became a charitable company, merged with the Parochial Charities of St Clement Oxford and changed its name to The Foundation of Thomas Dawson. In 2025 the charity's name reverted to "Charity of Thomas Dawson " whilst the former charity became the "Old Charity of Thomas Dawson (2004)".

==== The Parochial Charities of St Clement Oxford (1958-2024) ====
The Parochial Charities of St Clement Oxford was formed in July 1958 and augmented in 1959. It merged with the Charity of Thomas Dawson in 2024. The objects of the Parochial Charities was the general benefit of the poor in St Clement's Parish. It supported the needs of older parishioners through direct financial assistance and made grants to organisations working to alleviate poverty within the Parish. It was formed through the consolidation of three earlier charities:

- John Pyke's Charity for coal
- William James's Charity established in 1880 by the will of William James (1806–1880). Under the original terms, an income was to be paid to four poor men and six poor women aged 65 or over with the residue used to provide coal at Christmas to a further twenty poor people; all beneficiaries were to be resident in the parish.
- Compensation of £2,700, paid in 1959, by Oxford City Council for the compulsory purchase in 1936 of the Poor's Allotments. This was a piece of land on Cowley Road, Oxford "allotted in trust to the Churchwardens and former Overseers of the Poor as an allotment for the labouring poor in the Parish of Oxford St Clement" under the Cowley Enclosure Award of 1853.

It also received an annual allocation for the benefit of the poor from Dawson's Charity.

=== St Clement's Community Property ===
St Clement's Community Property (est. 2021), formerly St Clement's Parish Property (1903–2021), owns and maintains a small number of properties including St Clement's Centre, Cross Street and The Old Mission Hall and former Victoria Café at the corner of St Clement's Street and Boulter Street.

== Schools, 1839–1958 ==
In 1839, the Rector and churchwardens bought the former Baptist chapel in George Street (now Cave Street) and converted it into schools for boys, girls and infants in response to the growing population. In 1874, following criticisms about the state of the George Street buildings by government inspectors, St Clement's Infants' School moved to a new site in Bath Street on land provided by William James (1806–1880). New accommodation for the girls' school was included in the design of St Clement's Mission Hall (now 57a St Clement's Street) which was completed in 1891. The boys' school moved to a new site, provided by the Morrell family, in Cross Street in 1903. Following a reduction in pupil numbers, the girls' school merged with the boys' school at the Cross Street site in 1929. In 1956, senior pupils moved to the nearby secondary modern school, whilst the infants merged with the juniors at Cross Street until that, too, closed in 1958. The Cross Street site was subsequently acquired by St Clement's Parish Property for church and community use.

== Parish records ==
Most of St Clement's parish records have been deposited in the Diocesan Archive at Oxfordshire History Centre and some registers are available online. The archived registers are:

- Baptisms 1665-1964 (1665-1914 are online)
- Banns of marriage 1922-2006 (1817-1930 are online)
- Marriages 1665-2020 (1665-1930 are online)
- Burials
  - 1669-1858 are online
  - 1858-1883 are not online
  - 1883-1938 are online but indexed as 1858–1883

The combined register for 1665-1745 contains transcripts from an earlier register, now lost, of three burials (1597, 1643 and 1644) and one marriage (1621).

Burials for the period 1921-1937 are recorded in one of two registers (1883-1937 and 1921–2008).

== List of clergy ==
Between 1122 and c.1534, clergy were presented to St Clement's by St Frideswide's Priory, Oxford. Following the English Reformation of the 1530s the patronage passed briefly to Cardinal College (now Christ Church), Oxford and then to the Crown until the mid-19th Century. In 1858 it passed briefly to the Lord Chancellor and then to a series of trustees belonging to the Evangelical tradition of the Church of England.

=== Rectors, 21st century ===
- 2024 Mark Hay
- 2015-2023 Rachel Gibson

=== Rectors, 20th century ===
- 1992-2014 Bruce Gillingham
- 1969-1991 David Henry Ryder Bishop
- 1955 Peter John Garnett Cottingham
- 1947-1954 Hon. Jonathan Malcom Atholl Kenworthy
- 1937-1947 Arthur Murray Thom
- 1919-1936 Leslie Bradyll-Johnson
- 1913-1918 Thomas W Gilbert

=== Rectors, 19th century ===
- 1878-1911 Francis Pilcher
- 1878-1878 Henry Fermoy Dernford
- 1861-1877 John Thomson Darby,
- 1858-1861 Edward Arthur Litton
- 1850-1855 William Strong Hore
- 1831-1850 John William Hughes

=== Rectors, 18th century ===
- 1795-1831 John Gutch MA
- 1767-1795 Samuel Weller BD
- 1760-1767 John Bilstone MA
- 1751-1760 James Cosserat DD
- 1734-1751 Francis Webber MA
- 1724-1734 John Conybeare MA, theologian, later Dean of Christ Church, Oxford and Bishop of Bristol
- 1722-1724 John Evans MA

=== Rectors, 17th century ===
- 1696-1722 Joseph Harwar BD
- 1682-1696 Robert Harsnett BD, dismissed for not swearing allegiance to King William and Queen Mary following the Glorious Revolution of 1685
- 1679-1682 Humphrey Prideaux MA, orientalist, later Dean of Lincoln
- 1674-1679 Gilbert Wharton
- 1661-1672 Samuel Nalton MA
- 1641-1661 No record, English Civil War
- 1630-1641 William Chidley MA
- 1610-1630 Thomas Westley MA
- 1606-1610 Robert Lloyd MA
- 1604 Tobias Berricke

=== Rectors, 16th century ===
- 1589-1592 Thomas Lodington MA
- 1588 Reformed English Church splits from Rome under Queen Elizabeth I
- 1578-1585 Robert Briant or Bryan
- 1575-1575 Peter Pott MA
- 1567-1575 William Edwards BA
- 1561-1567 Geoffrey Vaughan
- 1557 Nicholas Pullen
- 1554-1557 William Sale
- 1553 English Church reunites with Rome under King Philip & Queen Mary I
- 1540 M John Powel

=== Clergy, 16th century-Reformation ===
Between 1122 and the Reformation clergy were presented to St Clement's by St Frideswide's Priory, Oxford.

- 1523 M William Bays, Deacon
- 1519 M Oliver Stonying, Rector
- 1516 M Richard Wynnesmore, Rector
- 1500 William Worcester, Deacon
- 1500 M John Gorle

=== Clergy, 15th century ===
- 1472 M Edmund Alyard
- 1471 Walter ap Hugh, Deacon
- 1466 M John Julyan, Deacon
- 1457 Robert Hoot, Chaplain, Rector
- 1451 M William Cook, Rector
- - - - - John Wing
- 1446 M William Byrtt
- 1444 Thomas Geffray, Rector
- - - - - Thomas Warner, Rector
- 1433 William Haweryve, Priest
- 1431 John Hugate, Priest
- 1424 William Freeman
- - - - - Thomas Gravely
- 1414 William Frydyan
- 1408 Robert Tunstall, Chaplain
- 1407 Robert Tracey, Rector
- 1405 Walter Stephen, appointed by the Crown
- - - - - 1405 Roger Trut

=== Clergy, 14th century ===
- - - - - M John Coll’, Rector
- 1399 Roger Gryt, Priest
- - - - -
- 1389 John Notteys, Rector, appointed by the Crown
- 1369 John Stockgrove
- 1369 John Aldewyne, Priest, Rector
- - - - - John Bruer
- 1351 Maurice le Brutt
- - - - - John of Garsington, Rector
- 1334 William de Burton, Priest
- 1331 Henry de Sandtredon, Priest
- 1328 John Jordon of Charlbury, Priest
- 1328 Reginald de Melton, Priest

=== Clergy, 13th century ===
- 1298 Henry de Norton, Chaplain
- - - - - Hugh, Deacon
- 1275 William de Parvo Ponte, Priest
- 1273-1275 M Robert of Brackley, Subdeacon
- 1272- 1273 Hugh de Deddington, Chaplain
- 1271- 1272 Henry de Estria, Chaplain
- 1271 Richard de Bradwell, Rector
- 1237 Richard of St Clement's, Chaplain
- 1220-1235 William, Deacon and parson

=== Clergy before 1220 ===
- No records

== See also ==
- St Clement's, Oxford
- List of churches in Oxford
