= Thomas Gilbert (clergyman) =

Church of England clergyman

Thomas Walter Gilbert (died 1942) was a Church of England clergyman and College Principal.

Gilbert studied at Balliol College Oxford, receiving a first class degree in Modern History in 1905, a B.D. in 1912, and a D.D. in 1923.

After studying at Wycliffe Hall, he was ordained deacon in 1906, and priested in the following year. He was appointed Curate of St Clements, Oxford, 1906–1908. He was Rector successively of: St Nicholas with St Runwald, Colchester, 1908–1913; St Clements, Oxford, 1913–1918; and Bradfield with Buckhold, 1918–1926. He acted as Examining Chaplain to the Bishop of Llandaff from 1924 to 1931.

He took up the post of Principal of St John's College, Highbury in 1926, and was Dean of the Theology Faculty of the University of London from 1940. He died in office in 1942.
