= British Phaenogamous Botany =

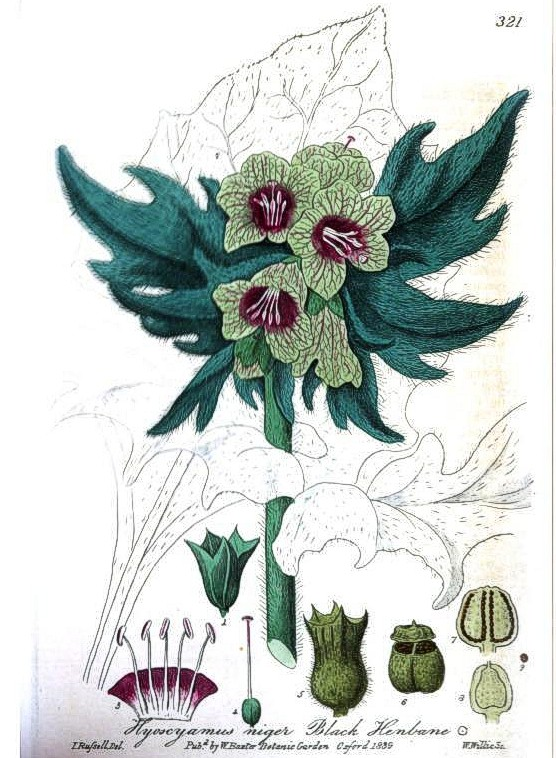
Hyoscyamus niger

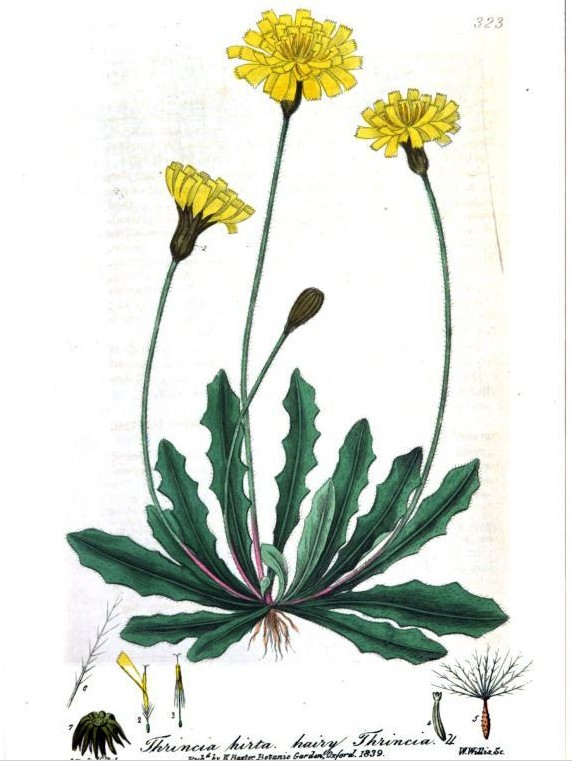
Thrincia hirta

British Phaenogamous Botany is a book of figures and descriptions of British flowering plants compiled by the botanist William Baxter.

== Description ==
The six volumes were published by Baxter himself in Oxford and sold by J.H. Parker as well as Whittaker, Treacher, and Co. in London.

The 509 hand-coloured copper-engraved plates were accompanied by botanical descriptions in octavo. To illustrate this work on the British flora, Baxter employed two local artists—a glass painter named Isaac Russell and C. Matthews. The plates were hand-coloured by Baxter's daughters and daughter-in-law. The original copies of these plates are located in Lindley Library.
