= Gutch Common =

Protected area in Wiltshire, England

Coordinates: 51.03237°N 2.14969°W

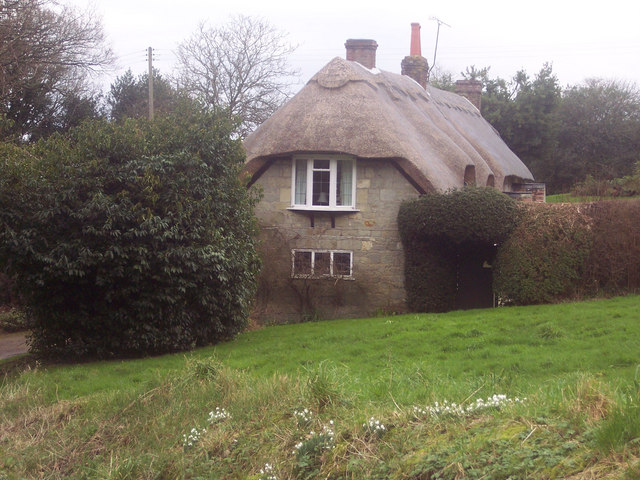
The Green and Thatched Cottage at Gutch Common

Gutch Common (grid reference ST896259) is a 35.1 hectare biological Site of Special Scientific Interest in Wiltshire, notified in 1951.

== Sources ==
- Natural England citation sheet for the site (accessed 1 March 2022)
