= Philip Burnard Ayres =

British physician, botanist and plant collector (1813–1863)

Philip Burnard Ayres (1813–1863) was a British physician, botanist and plant collector. He was born at Thame in Oxfordshire on 12 December 1813. He initially began to collect plants in his native United Kingdom and also in France. Between 1841 and 1845 he issued two exsiccatae, namely Mycologia Britannica or specimens of British fungi and with William Baxter the duplicate specimen series Flora Thamnensis. In 1856 Ayres was appointed by Queen Victoria to superintendency of quarantine on Flat Island, Mauritius under governor Robert Townsend Farquhar. Ayres is particularly well known for his extensive plant collections made while in this position. He is also credited for finding the first sub fossil remains of the dodo in 1860. From 1856 to 1863 he traveled through Madagascar, the Seychelles, and the Mascarenes to develop this rich collection of Indian Ocean plant specimens. These specimens are now in the herbaria collections of the Natural History Museum, London, the Royal Botanic Garden Edinburgh, the Royal Botanic Gardens, Kew, the Missouri Botanical Garden and the Muséum National d'Histoire Naturelle, Paris. In addition to collecting, Ayres catalogued and sketched the plants in the wild, as was common among nineteenth century naturalists. He also planned to write a book about the flora of Mauritius, but he died from relapsing fever in his home in Port Louis on 30 April 1863 before the flora could be accomplished. Ayres' wife Harriet collected his written records and bequeathed them to the Royal Botanic Gardens, Kew.

His eldest son Philip Burnard Chenery Ayres (1840–1899) became a well-known surgeon in Hong Kong.

== Publications ==
- Micro-Chemical Researches on the Digestion of Starch and Amylaceous Foods. Proceedings of the Royal Society of London, Vol. 7, (1854–1855), 1855
