= John Wheeley Gough Gutch =

British surgeon and editor

John Wheeley Gough Gutch (1809–1862) was a British surgeon and editor. He was also a keen amateur naturalist and geologist, and a pioneer photographer.

He was born at Bristol in 1809, the son of John Mathew Gutch, and was educated as a surgeon at the infirmary there.

He became a member of the Royal College of Surgeons; and for a time he practised at Florence, Swansea, and London. It was while living in Swansea in the 1840s that he compiled the city's first reliable weather records, published in The Phytologist (1841) his "A List of plants met within the neighbourhood of Swansea" and became enthusiastically involved in the new science of photography.

Afterwards, he was appointed one of the Queen's Messengers; from which post he retired on a pension shortly before his death, in consequence of a stroke of paralysis.

From 1842 to 1856 he edited The Literary and Scientific Register, an annual encyclopædia; he also contributed to Felix Farley's Journal, a journal which his father had founded in Bristol.

He died in Bloomsbury Square on 30 April 1862, leaving a widow, but no children.
