= John Gutch (clergyman) =

British Anglican clergyman and antiquarian

John Gutch MA (Oxon)
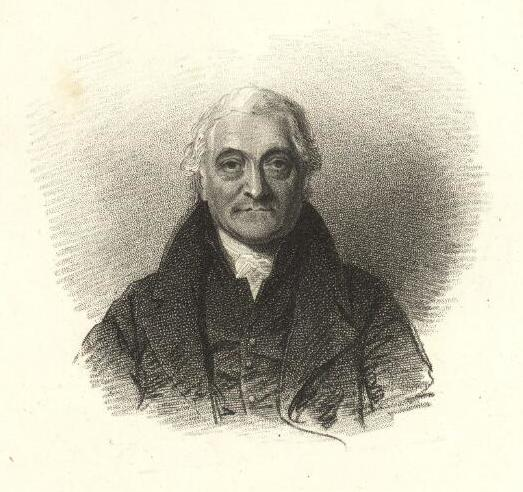
- Born: 10 January 1746; Wells, Somerset, England
- Died: 1 July 1831 (aged 85); Oxford, England
- Education: All Souls College, Oxford
- Occupation: Clergyman
- Known for: Editing and translating the works of Anthony Wood
- Spouse: Elizabeth Weller (m. 1775)

John Gutch (10 January 1746 – 1 July 1831) was an Anglican clergyman and official of the University of Oxford. He was also an antiquarian, with a particular interest in the history of the university.

== Life ==
John Gutch's father, also called John, was town clerk of Wells, Somerset; Gutch was born there on 10 January 1746 and proceeded to study at the University of Oxford, matriculating as a member of All Souls College in 1765, graduating in 1767. He was ordained in the following year and was initially a curate in Wellow and Foxcote near Bath, Somerset. In 1770, he was appointed chaplain of All Souls College (a post that he would hold until his death over sixty years later), also becoming college librarian in 1771 and chaplain of Corpus Christi College in 1778. He was appointed Registrar of the university in 1797, retiring from this position in 1824 with an annuity of £200 from the university.

Gutch was rector of Waterstock, Oxfordshire from 1777 to 1789 and of Kirkby Underwood, Lincolnshire from 1786 to 1831. From 1795 he was also rector of St Clement's Church, Oxford, where from 1824 his curate was John Henry Newman. He died on 1 July 1831 and was buried at St Peter-in-the-East, Oxford. There is a memorial to him in St Clement's Church, Oxford.

== Scholar ==
Gutch's major contribution to scholarship was his edition of Anthony Wood's History of Oxford University, a work which had had an involved publication history. Gutch's other publications included two volumes of miscellaneous historical material about the university.

=== Wood's History of Oxford University ===
By around 1668 Wood had finished a large manuscript, written in English, of the university's history. It was divided into two parts: the first dealt with the general history of the University up to 1648, and the second with the Schools, Lectureships, the Colleges and Halls, Libraries, and the chief Magistrates (Fasti) Chancellors, Provosts etc. Wood's MS was purchased by the Officers of the University Press for £100, on condition that it be published in a Latin translation. It was duly translated, and edited by John Fell.

Fell made his own additions, emendations and deletions, in particular striking out passages which Wood had inserted in praise of Thomas Hobbes, and substituted some disparagement. The Latin edition was printed in the basement of the Sheldonian Theatre and published in two volumes in 1674.

Wood complained about this translation. Thomas Warton, in his Life and Literary Remains of Ralph Bathurst (1761), was forthright: "The translation ... is full of mistakes; it is also stiff and unpleasing, perpetually disgusting the reader with the affectation of phraseology." After some revision, Wood began in August 1676 to rewrite his original, continuing almost to his death in 1695. He left this new manuscript to the University, and it was deposited in the Bodleian library, as two volumes in folio.

=== Gutch's edition ===
Gutch edited this second manuscript copy and published it in five volumes from 1786 to 1796. The publication history is again somewhat convoluted,

He began with the second half of vol. 2 of the 1674 Latin edition, the history of the Colleges and Halls (1786), followed by the Fasti Oxoniensis (1790), the latter part of vol. 1 of 1674. These were followed by the general history of the University (the Annals) in three volumes, the first of which (1792) contained Lives of the author, partially adapted by Gutch from Wood's autobiography. Gutch's last volume of the general history (1796) also contained (from p. 709) the first half of vol. 2 of the Latin edition, namely, the history of the Schools, Lectureships, Officers, Libraries etc.

=== Further work on Wood's legacy ===
Andrew Clark (1856–1922) did much further work on Wood's papers for the Oxford Historical Society. He published from them Antiquities of the City of Oxford (1889–1899), in three volumes, and The Life and Times of Anthony Wood (1891–1900) in five volumes.

== Publications ==
- Wood, Anthony (1786). Gutch, John (ed.). The History and Antiquities of the Colleges and Halls in the University of Oxford. Oxford: Clarendon Press.
- Wood, Anthony (1790). Gutch, John (ed.). Appendix to the history and antiquities of the colleges and halls in the University of Oxford : containing 'Fasti Oxonienses', or a Commentary on the Supreme Magistrates of the University. Oxford: Clarendon Press.
- Wood, Anthony (1792). Gutch, John (ed.). The History and Antiquities of the University of Oxford, in two books: Volume the First. (vol. 1 of 3). Oxford: Clarendon Press.
- Wood, Anthony (1796). Gutch, John (ed.). The History and Antiquities of the University of Oxford, in two books: Volume the Second. (vol. 2 of 3). Oxford: Clarendon Press.
- Wood, Anthony (1796). Gutch, John (ed.). The History and Antiquities of the University of Oxford, in two books: Volume the Second, Second Part. (vol. 3 of 3). Oxford: Clarendon Press.

== Family ==
Gutch married in 1775 Elizabeth Weller (1753–1799), daughter of Richard Weller who had worked as butler for Magdalen College. They had six sons and six daughters; including John Mathew Gutch and Robert Gutch.
