= John Mathew Gutch =

British historian and journalist

John Mathew Gutch FSA (1776–1861) was an English journalist and historian.

== Life ==
John Mathew, eldest son of John Gutch, was born in 1776, probably at Oxford, and was educated at Christ's Hospital, where he was the schoolfellow of Samuel Taylor Coleridge and Charles Lamb. He first entered business as a law stationer in Southampton Buildings, where Lamb for a time lodged with him in the latter part of 1800. Shortly before Lamb's death Gutch commissioned F. S. Cary to paint Lamb's portrait.

In 1803 Gutch moved to Bristol, and became proprietor and printer of Felix Farley's Bristol Journal, with which he was connected till his death, though he disposed of his proprietary share of the paper in 1844. Gutch acquired a great reputation as a provincial journalist, and this induced him to join with Robert Alexander in starting the London Morning Journal; in this enterprise he not only lost much of the money which he had saved, but was also prosecuted for libelling George IV and Lord-chancellor John Copley, 1st Baron Lyndhurst in May 1829. Gutch almost at once severed his connection with the paper; he was, however, convicted in December, but was shortly afterwards discharged on his own recognisances. Alexander, who had been concerned in a further libel on the Duke of Wellington, was sent to Newgate Prison, and the Morning Journal was suppressed.

Besides his journalistic work Gutch conducted for some years a secondhand book business, and issued two catalogues in 1810 and 1812, and was also the publisher of a few books. After his second marriage in 1823 he moved to Worcester, where he joined his wife's father as a banker, but still went to Bristol every week to superintend the publication of Farley's Journal. The bank failed in 1848.

Gutch possessed a large library, especially rich in the works of George Wither, which was sold by Messrs. Sotheby & Wilkinson in London in 1858 for over £1,800.

He died at his residence, Barbourne, near Worcester, on 20 September 1861, aged 84. Gutch was twice married: (1) to Mary Wheeley, daughter of a coachmaker at Birmingham, by whom he had one son, John Wheeley Gough Gutch, and (2) in 1823 to Mary, a daughter of Mr. Lavender, a banker of Worcester; by her he had no children. He was a J.P. for Worcestershire, and a fellow of the Society of Antiquaries.

== Works ==
Gutch wrote or edited:

- Narrative of a singular Imposture carried out at Bristol by one Mary Baker, styling herself the Princess Caraboo, 1817. regarding the hoaxer 'Princess Caraboo'.
- Poems of George Wither, Bristol, 1820, three vols.; this collection was never completed; some copies are divided into four vols., and bear the date 1839. Gutch had written a life of Wither, apparently to accompany his edition of the poems, but when he quit Bristol left the sheets in a warehouse, in which they suffered such injury that "if I had not preserved for my own private library sheets of all, I could not have made a perfect copy. This I have done, and it is the only one in existence" (letter from Gutch, quoted in Athenæum, 1858, i. 500).
- The Country Constitutional Guardian, a monthly serial which appeared from 1822 to 1824.
- The present mode of Election of the Mayor and Sheriffs and Common Council of Bristol, Bristol, 1825; reprinted from 'Farley's Journal.'
- Felix Farley Rhymes by Themaninthemoon, i.e. Rev. John Eagles, who was a friend of Gutch.
- Observations upon the Writing of the Ancients, upon the Materials they used, and upon the Introduction of the Art of Printing, Bristol, 1827; four papers read before the Literary and Philosophical Society of the Bristol Institution.
- Robin Hood Garlands and Ballads, with the tale of the lytell Geste. A collection of all the poems and ballads relating to this celebrated yeoman, with his history, 2 vols. 1850 (illustrated by Fairholt). In 1867 appeared Robin Hood; a Collection of Ballads, Songs, and Poems, with Notes by J. M. Gutch.
- A Garland of Roses from the Poems of the late Rev. John Eagles, 1857; only fifty copies printed for private circulation.
- Watson Redivivus: four Discourses … of the Rev. George Watson, M.A., Fellow of University College, Oxford, and Tutor … of Bishop Horne, 1860.

Gutch also published anonymously The Letters of Cosmo, which originally appeared in Farley's Journal, and earned for him the name of the Bristol Junius. According to the writer in the Gentleman's Magazine for 1862, he also wrote some pamphlets on local subjects, and an octavo volume on the Bristol riots of 1832. He contributed to the Gentleman's Magazine and to Notes and Queries, and at the time of his death was compiling for the Warwickshire Archæological Society a history of the battle-fields of that county; a portion was published in the society's Transactions.
