= William Baxter (Oxford Botanic Garden curator) =

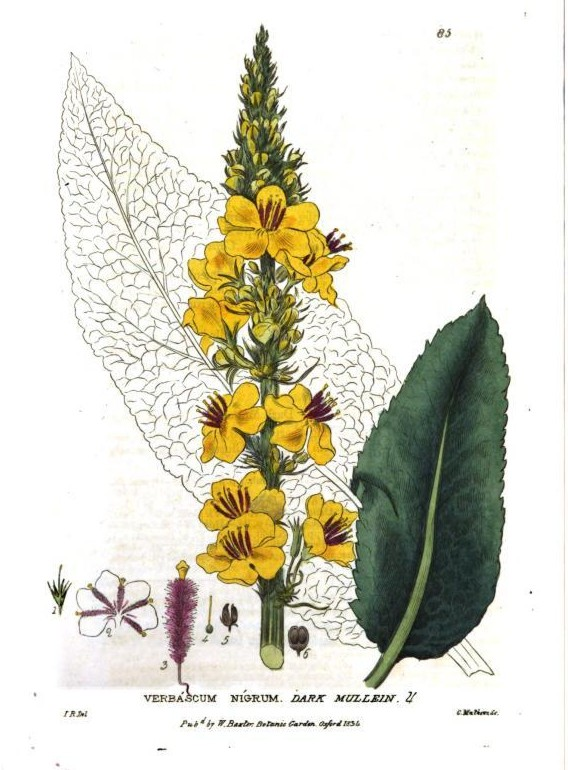
Verbascum nigrum L.

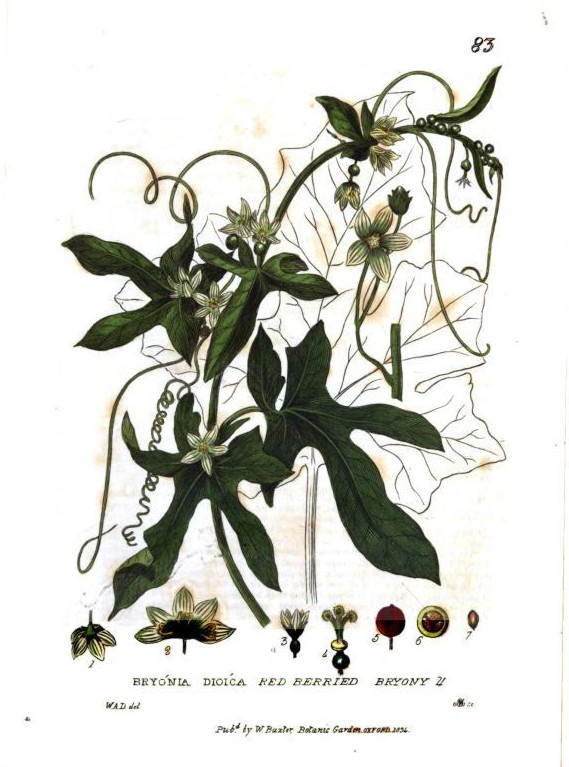
Bryonia dioica Jacq.

William Baxter ALS, FHS (Rugby, Warwickshire, 15 January 1787 – 1 November 1871), was a British botanist, author of British Phaenogamous Botany and appointed curator of the Oxford Botanic Garden in 1813. From 1825 to 1828 he edited the exsiccata series Stirpes cryptogamae Oxonienses, or dried specimens of cryptogamous plants collected in the vicinity of Oxford. With Philip Burnard Ayres he distributed another exsiccata under the title Flora Thamnensis.

British Phaenogamous Botany or Figures and Descriptions of the Genera of British Flowering Plants, was published in 6 volumes by William Baxter between 1834 and 1843, with 509 hand-coloured copper-plate engravings by Isaac Russell (an Oxford glass painter) and C. Matthews. These men were not trained botanical artists, but gradually acquired a good working knowledge of the subject. The engravings were later hand-coloured by Baxter's daughters and daughter-in-law. The volumes were sold by Whittaker, Treacher and Co., London and John W. Parker.

William Hart Baxter (c.1816–1890), William Baxter's son, succeeded his father as curator of the Oxford Botanic Garden. This botanist is denoted by the author abbreviation Baxter when citing a botanical name.
